= Edinburgh Advertiser =

- Type: Twice weekly newspaper
- Format: Quarto; Small folio; 4 pp. folio of the modern newspaper size
- Publisher: Alexander Donaldson & John Reid; James Donaldson; Claud Muirhead
- Editor: Andrew Crichton; Robert Chambers; Robert W. Paterson
- Founded: 3 January 1764
- Ceased publication: 29 March 1859
- Political alignment: Tory
- Language: English
- Headquarters: Edinburgh, Scotland

"...the Edinburgh Advertiser is the only politico-ecclesiastico journal in the (British) empire which is against the (Church of Scotland's) General Assembly in toto".

— London and Edinburgh Magazine, 1841.

The Edinburgh Advertiser, sometimes referred to as The Advertiser, was a twice-weekly newspaper published in Edinburgh, Scotland, on Tuesday and Friday mornings for almost a century, from 1764 to 1859.

At the time of its inception, it was the only newspaper published on these days of the week in Edinburgh. It ran from 3 January 1764 until 29 March 1859 when it merged with the Edinburgh Evening Courant. Through the years, its offices were located at Castlehill; No. 91 Rose Street; No. 13 South Hanover Street; 210 High Street; 15 India Street; and 7 Heriot Row.

== Publishers ==
Its first publishers were Alexander Donaldson and John Reid. Reid's name appeared on the masthead briefly, only through 21 August 1764, at which time, only Donaldson's continued. Donaldson, a bookseller as well as printer and publisher, is most notable for the 1774 Donaldson v Beckett court case relating to shared perpetual copyrights. In 1774, the newspaper passed from Donaldson to his son, James Donaldson. In 1820, James sold the paper to Claud Muirhead of Heriot Row and Gogar Park, Midlothian. Of the large fortune made by the Donaldsons, James bequeathed it for the endowment of Donaldson's Hospital.

== Operations ==
Claud's father, James Muirhead, printer, Burgess and Guild Brother, served as the newspaper's printer, principal manager and superintendent. Rev. Andrew Crichton, a Scottish biographer and historian, served as editor until 1851 when he was replaced by Robert W. Paterson. For a short period, editorial control was held by Robert Chambers. At one point in time, Christopher North (the pseudonym of the Scottish writer John Wilson), was said to be associated with the Edinburgh Advertiser. James Macaulay was a foreman. Journeymen printers included John Bryce, James Lamb, Robert Lamb, and George Robertson. Two of the pressmen were James Thomson and Joseph Thompson.

The paper was run frugally. Its initial cost was 2½d, and it was increased to 7d by 1820. It covered news, religion, trade, manufacturing, agriculture, politics, and entertainment of Great Britain and the Colonial United States; it also published essays. Its motto, Quidquid agunt homines, uotum, timor, ira, uoluptas, gaudia, discursus, nostri farrago libelli, (translation: "whatever men do – prayer, fear, rage, pleasure, joy, running about – is the grist of my little book") is a satire by the Roman poet Juvenal.

Office locations for the Edinburgh Advertiser
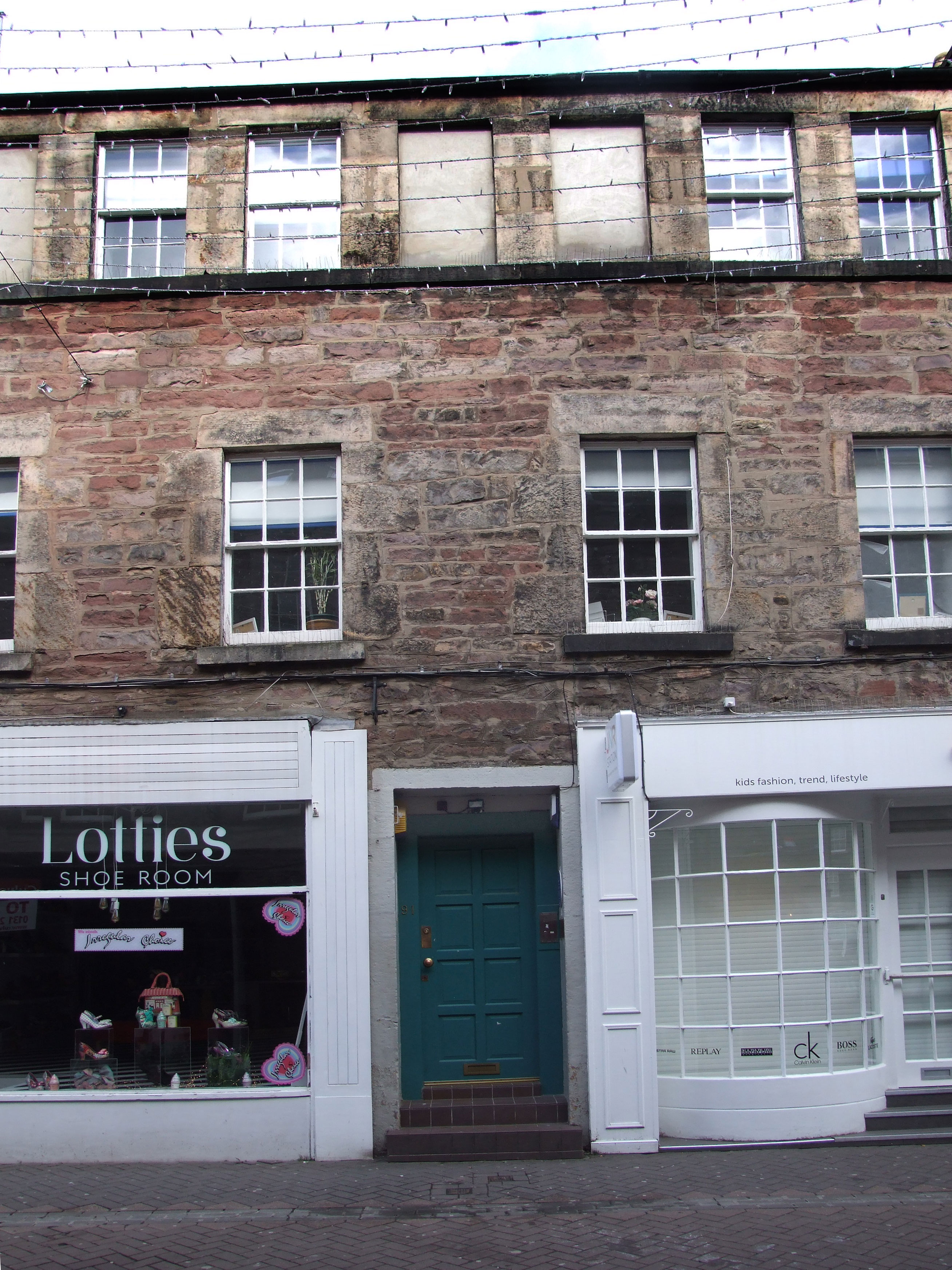
No. 91 Rose Street

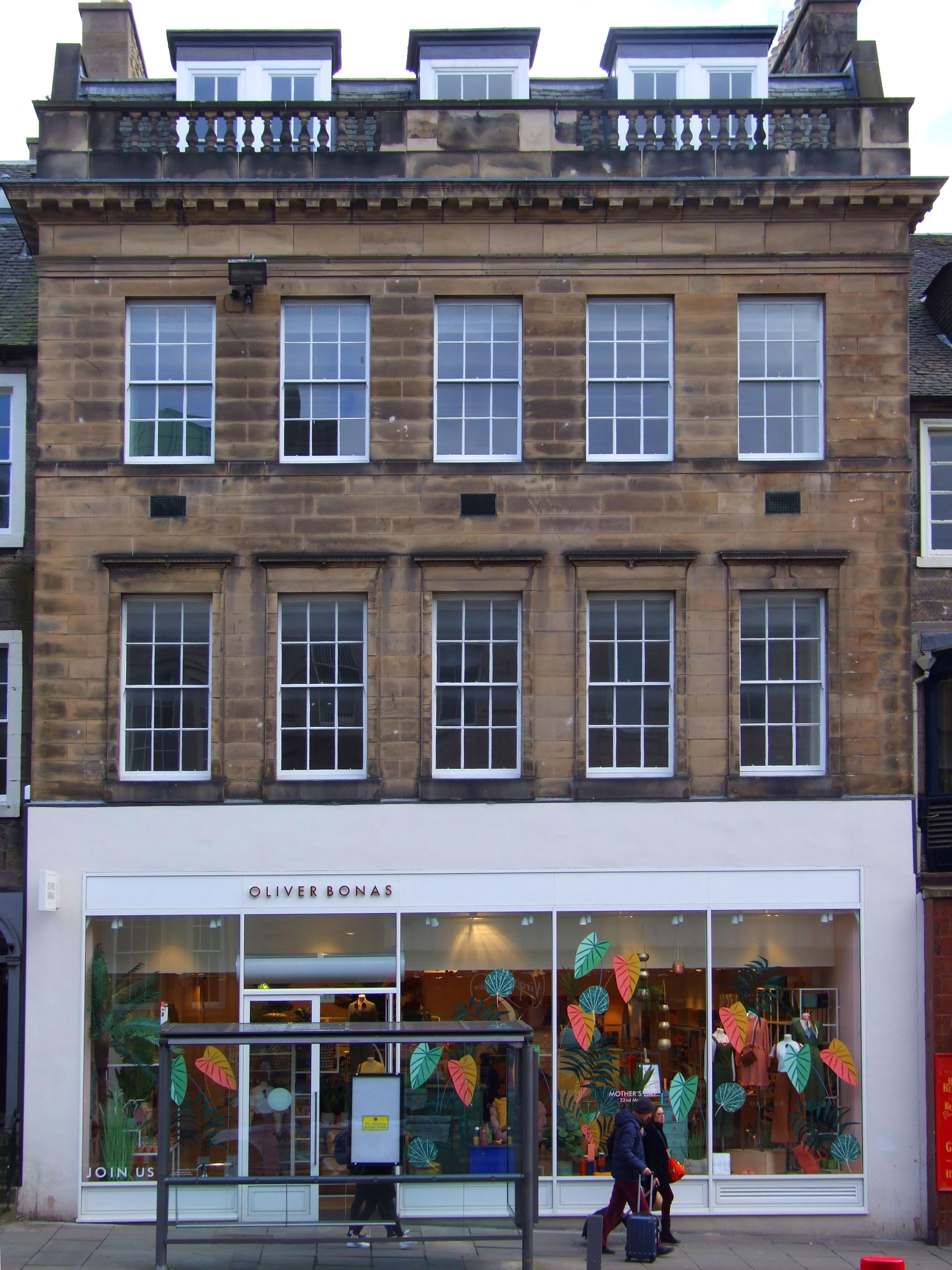
No. 13 South Hanover Street

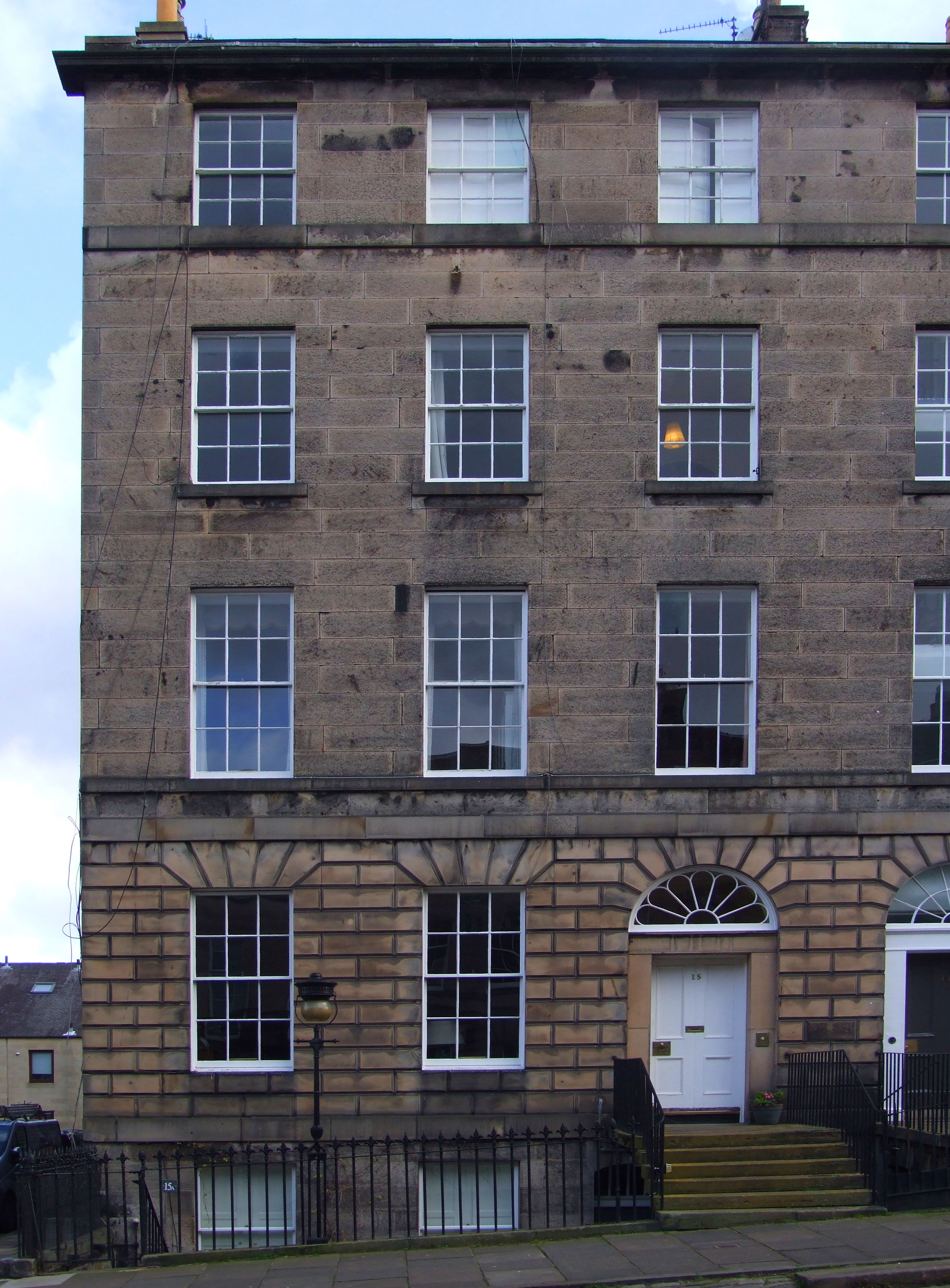
15 India Street

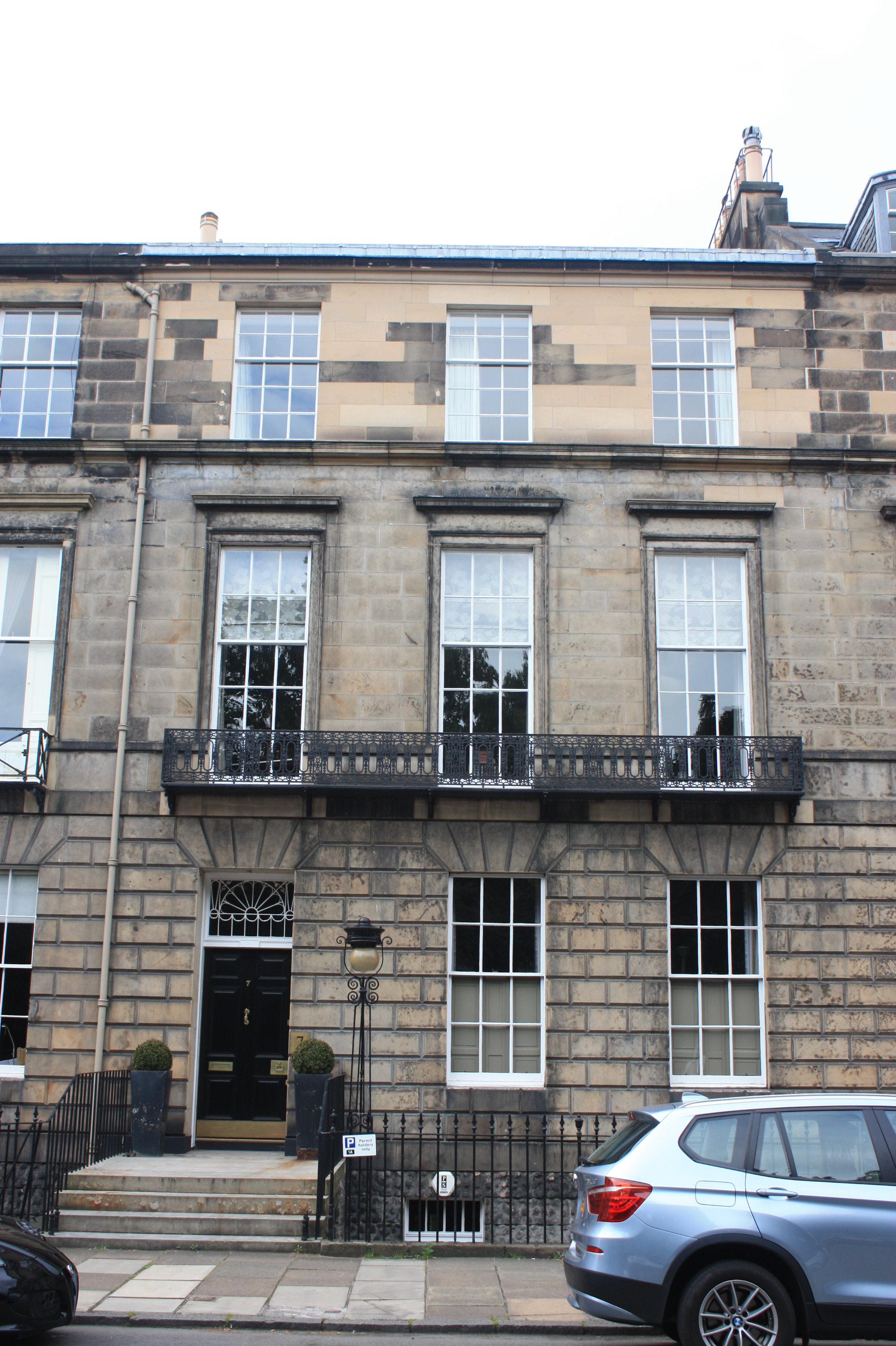
7 Heriot Row

== History ==
The newspaper was the first to publish some historically important pieces. The first publication of Epitaph: On Robert Fergusson appeared in the 7–11 August 1789 issue. One literary note was the first publication of Robert Burns' On the Commemoration of Rodney's Victory which appeared in the 16–19 April 1793 issue. After Burns' death, several of his epigrams were published in the 8 August 1800 issue.

== See also ==
- List of newspapers in Scotland
