= Claud Muirhead =

Scottish publisher and editor (1782–1872)

- Born: November 1, 1782
- Died: March 28, 1872 (aged 89); Edinburgh, Scotland
- Occupation(s): Printer, publisher and editor
- Spouse: Mary Watson (married 1828)
- Children: 5 sons, including James Muirhead, Dr Claud Muirhead, Dr William Muir Muirhead.
- Parent(s): James Muirhead, Anne Cleghorn

Claud Muirhead (1782–1872) was an 18th-century Scottish printer and publisher and editor of the Edinburgh Advertiser.

== Life ==
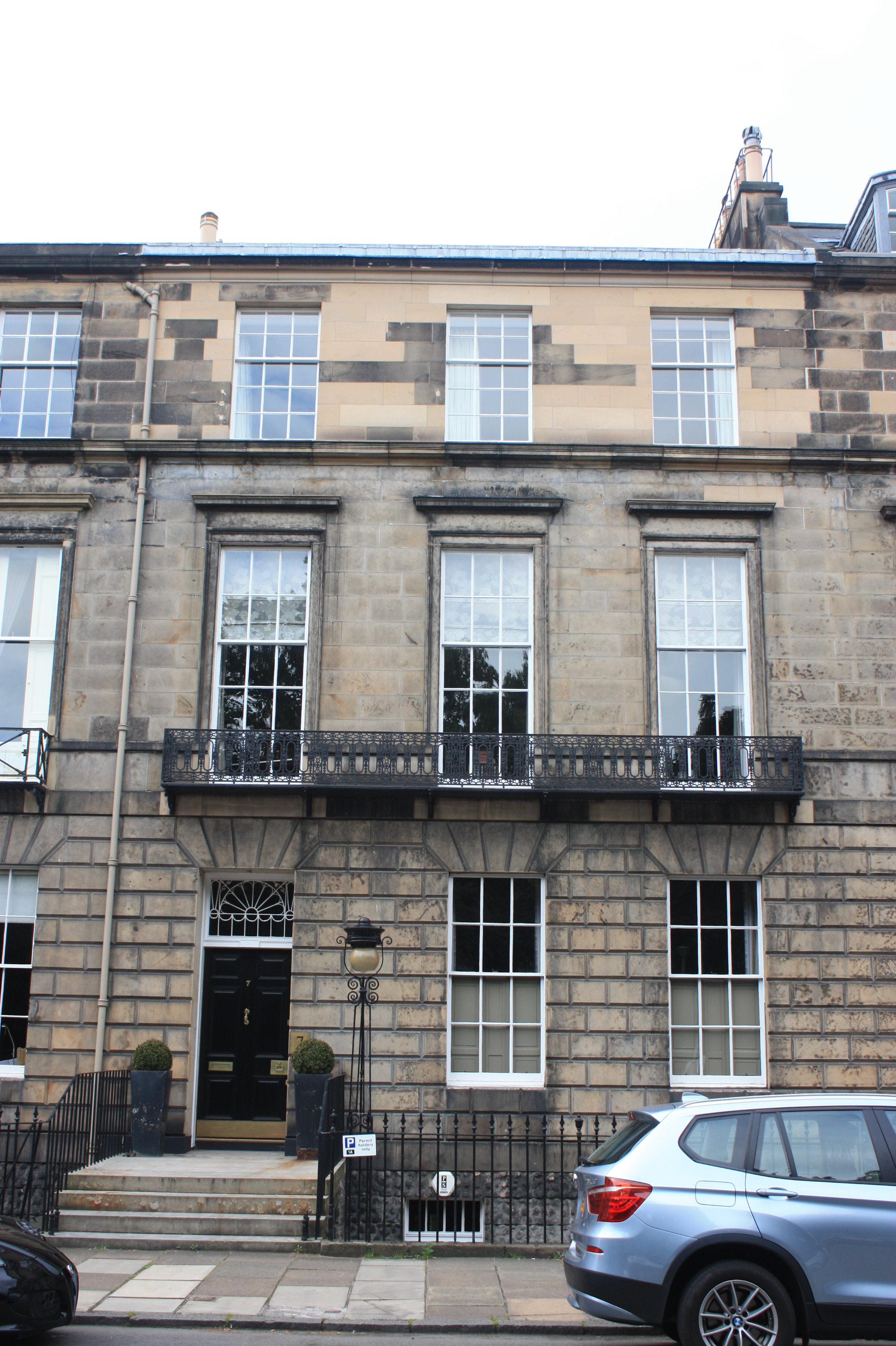
7 Heriot Row

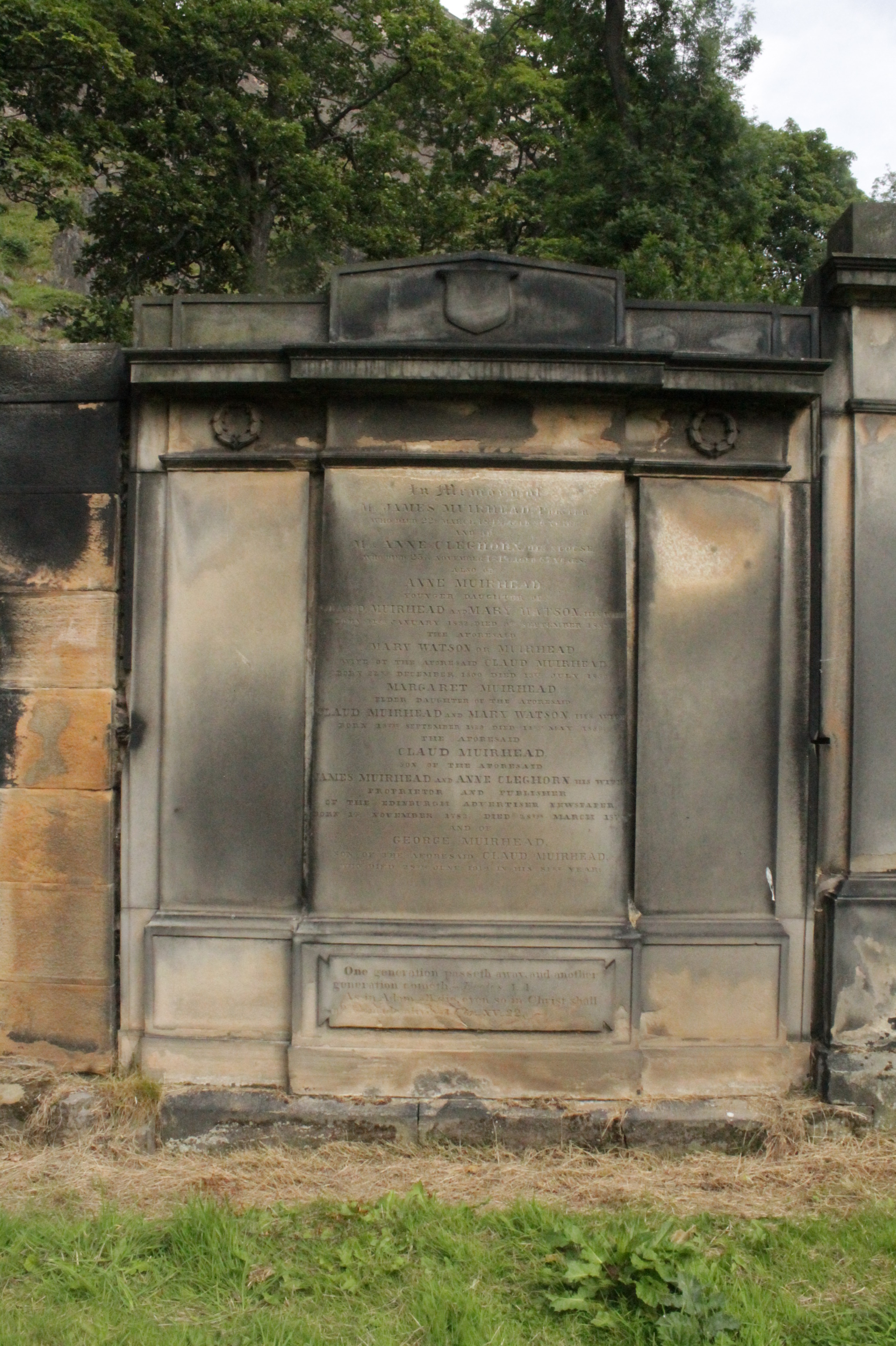
The grave of Claud Muirhead, St Cuthberts Churchyard, Edinburgh

He was born on 1 November 1782, the son of printer James Muirhead (1757–1843) and his wife Anne Cleghorn (1751–1818).

The family only appear in Edinburgh in the early 19th century. His father had a print-works at 91 Rose Street and a house at 3 Queensferry Street.

In 1820 Muirhead purchased the publication rights of the Advertiser from James Donaldson (the founder of Donaldson's School). He moved the publishing of the paper to his father's print-works at Rose Street. An extra storey was built onto the existing two-storey building at this time.

Immensely rich he was able to purchase both Gogar Park, a large estate west of Edinburgh (now the Headquarters of the Royal Bank of Scotland) and a house at 7 Heriot Row designed by William Sibbald and Robert Reid.

Not until 1825 does Claud appear independently in registers: living at 21 Heriot Row. His father's print-works on Rose Street was also renamed J & C Muirhead at the same time. On his father's death in 1844 he became sole proprietor of the printworks. By 1850 the "Advertiser" had an additional office at 13 Hanover Street but the print-works remained on Rose Street.

Muirhead died in Edinburgh on 28 March 1872, aged 89, and is buried with his parents in St Cuthbert's Churchyard off the west end of Princes Street. The grave lies midway along the southern boundary wall, underneath Edinburgh Castle.

== Family ==
Muirhead married Mary Watson (1800–1853) on 6 August 1828.

Muirhead had three sons, the eldest of whom was James Muirhead, (1830–1889) Professor of Civil Law at University of Edinburgh. Two younger sons, Claud Muirhead (1836–1910) and William Muir Muirhead (1838–1911) were both physicians, both of whom earned their MDs at the University of Edinburgh in 1862. All three were educated at Edinburgh Academy.
