= James Donaldson (publisher) =

Scottish printer and newspaper publisher

Sir James Donaldson
- Born: 10 December 1751; Edinburgh, Scotland
- Died: 16 December 1830 (aged 79); Edinburgh, Scotland
- Occupation: Newspaper publisher
- Spouse: Jane Gillespie
- Family: Alexander Donaldson, father

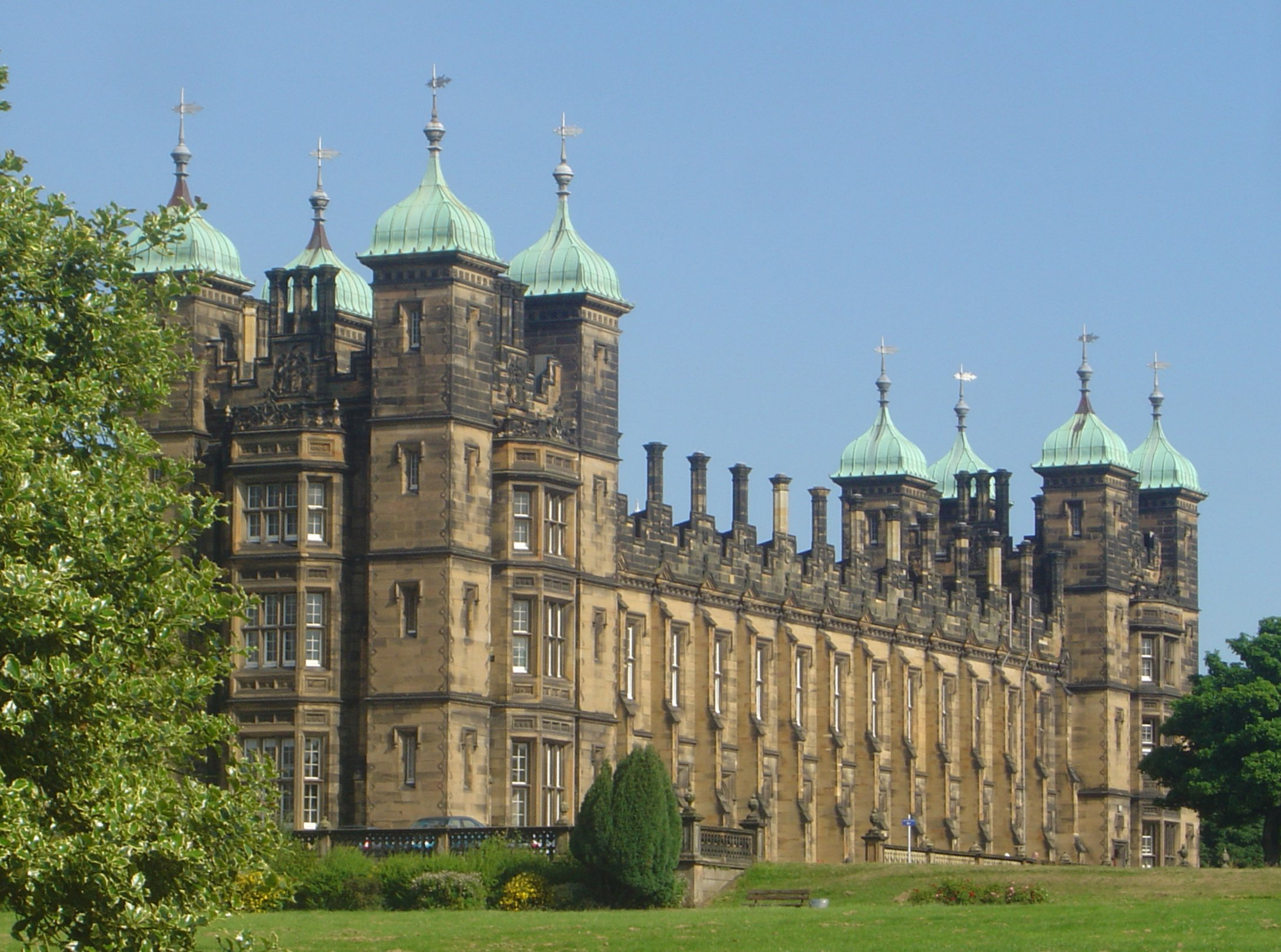
The original Donaldson's Hospital (renamed Donaldson's College), built in 1851 by the Scottish architect William Henry Playfair, in West Coates, Edinburgh

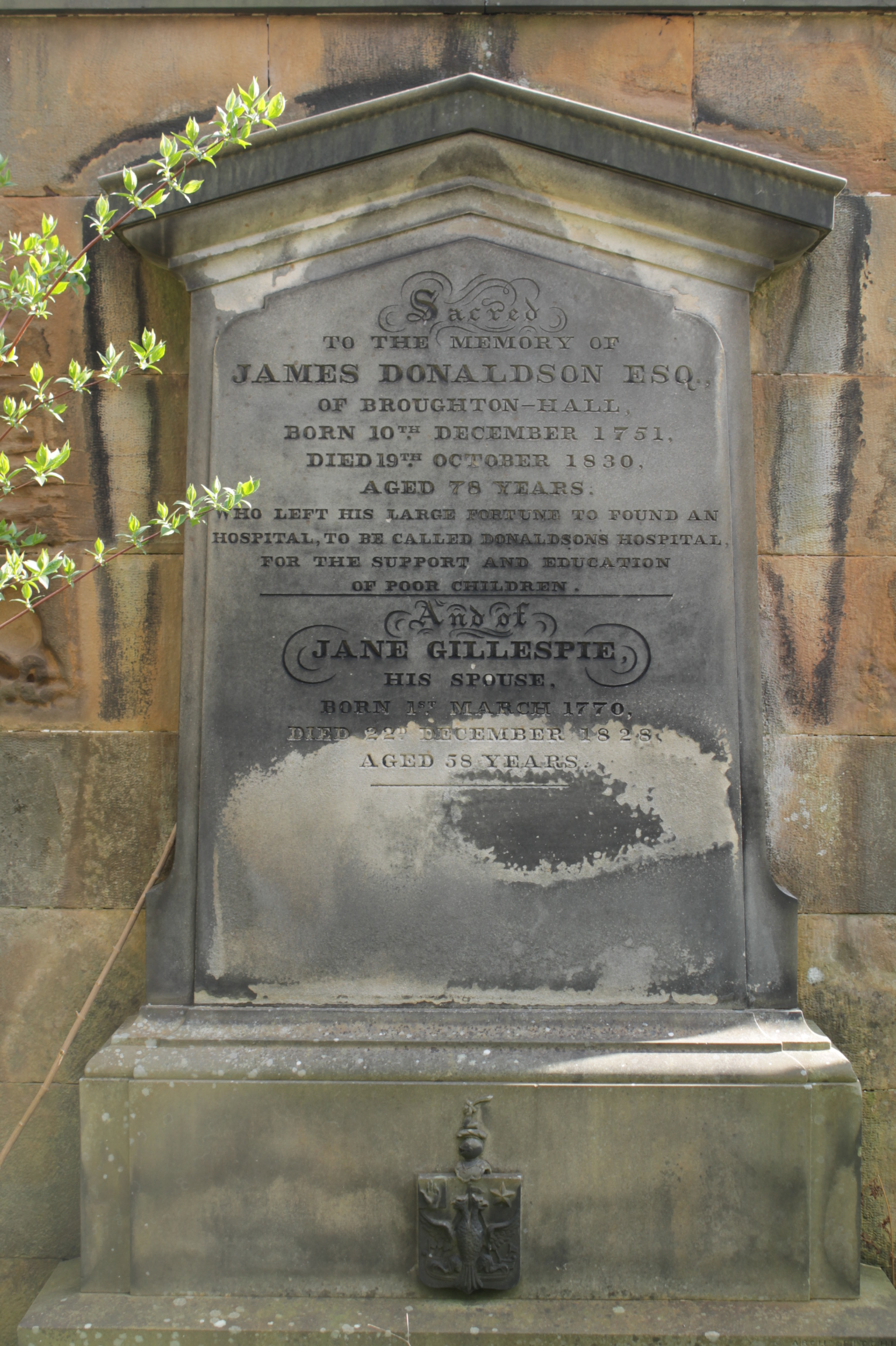
James Donaldson's grave, St John's Churchyard, Edinburgh

Sir James Donaldson (10 December 1751 – 16 December 1830) was a Scottish printer and newspaper publisher. He bequeathed a large part of his estate to the founding of Donaldson's Hospital.

== Early life ==
Donaldson was born near the Mercat Cross in Edinburgh, Scotland in 1751. His father, Alexander Donaldson (1727–1794), was the founding publisher of the Edinburgh Advertiser, but was perhaps better known as a bookseller and litigant, most notably Donaldson v Beckett, during the era known as the Battle of the booksellers. His mother was Anna Marshall, a merchant's daughter. He had younger brothers, but all died young.

His paternal grandparents were James Donaldson (died 1754), a textile manufacturer, and Treasurer of Edinburgh; and Elizabeth Weir (died 1768). He had an uncle, John Donaldson, a London bookseller and partner of his father who was also an appellant in Donaldson v Beckett.

== Career ==
At age 22, Donaldson became the second publisher of the Tory biweekly newspaper the Edinburgh Advertiser, the paper having been turned over to him by his father. His printing house was located at Castlehill. His apprentices and apprentice compositors included William Wilson, James Campbell, William Begg, Robert Miller, and James Thomson. In 1820, Donaldson sold the paper to Claud Muirhead, son of James Muirhead, the paper's principal manager and superintendent.

Donaldson was a member of the Edinburgh Bookseller's Society. In 1782, like his father, he became a Burgess and Guild Brother of Edinburgh.

== Personal life ==
Donaldson married Jane Gillespie, eldest daughter of Dr Thomas Gillespie, a physician, and his wife Jean Gillespie (née Thomson), on 29 September 1792. James and Jane had no children.

He spent most of his life in Edinburgh. He owned two homes, one in town, the other in the country. The former was located at 85 Princes Street, now the site of New Club. The later, Broughton Hall, had been his father's home. He inherited £100,000 from his father, and doubled that through wise investing. Known for his benevolence, Donaldson gave money to beggars each week. He was also known for being an eccentric.

Donaldson died at Broughton Hall in 1830. Shortly after his death, Broughton Hall's attached garden was converted into zoological gardens. He bequeathed £220,000 of his estate for the foundation of Donaldson's Hospital to maintain and educate poor children, with a preference for those named Donaldson or Marshall.

He is buried against the southern wall of the churchyard of St Johns at the west end of Princes Street, backing onto the north section of St Cuthberts Churchyard.
