= Alexander Donaldson (bookseller) =

Scottish bookseller, publisher and printer (1727 – 1794)

- Born: 1733
- Died: 11 March 1794 (aged 60–61); Broughton Hall, Edinburgh, Scotland
- Occupations: Bookseller; publisher; printer
- Known for: Appellant in Donaldson v Beckett; Founder/Publisher, Edinburgh Advertiser
- Spouse: Anna Marshall
- Children: James Donaldson
- Parent(s): James Donaldson, Treasurer of Edinburgh; Elizabeth Weir

Alexander Donaldson (1727 – 11 March 1794) was a Scottish bookseller, publisher, and printer. Donaldson was the founding publisher of the weekly newspaper, the Edinburgh Advertiser. He was also known for selling cheap copies of books after their copyright had expired in disregard to London booksellers' opinions on literary property.

== Early years ==
Donaldson was the son of Dr James Donaldson (died 1754), a textile manufacturer and Treasurer of Edinburgh. His mother was Elizabeth Weir (died 1768). He had an older brother, John. His paternal grandfather was Capt. James Donaldson, publisher of The Edinburgh Gazette. Donaldson inherited approximately £10,000 from his father.

In 1748, he opened a bookselling shop in Edinburgh. Two years later, on 29 August 1750, he was made a Burgess and Guild Brother of Edinburgh by right of his father in lieu of an apprenticeship. He married a merchant's daughter, Anna Marshall, on 10 January 1751 and may have received a substantial dowry.

== Career ==
Having the financial wherewithal, Donaldson become a junior partner of Alexander Kincaid from 1751–58. In its first year, Kincaid & Donaldson published Dr. Francis Home's Essay on the Contents and Virtues of Dunse-Spaw and Henry Home's Essays on the Principles of Morality and Natural Religion. In 1752, Kincaid & Donaldson was the sole publisher of David Hume's Political Discourses. After Donaldson left Kincaid, his involvement with the Scottish Enlightenment's new books was essentially over, with the exception of his involvement with James Boswell. Kincaid went on to become Lord Provost of Edinburgh.

Donaldson joined the printing firm of Sands Donaldson Murray & Cochran in 1755–1759. He worked with John Reid at Castlehill from 1760 until 1765. In January 1764, they began printing and publishing the Edinburgh Advertiser, though Reid remained with the newspaper for less than a year. Donaldson maintained at least two book shops while publishing the twice-weekly Advertiser, one being at the Strand, London, and the other in Edinburgh.

From 1765 until 1772, he had a shop at Castlehill. Donaldson and his older brother John also owned a bookstore in London, selling books that were printed in Scotland until July 1773 at which time John remained at the Arundel Street shop, and Alexander moved to St Paul's Churchyard. In 1774, after ten years printing and publishing the Edinburgh Advertiser, Donaldson turned it over to his 22-year-old son, James.

=== Battle of the booksellers ===
"[Donaldson is] no better than Robin Hood, who robbed the rich in order to give to the poor."

— Dr. Johnson

Donaldson was a notable "purveyor of cheap reprints" that were no longer protected by the Statute of Anne in a time known as the "Battle of the booksellers". His attitude towards copyright was not embraced by London merchants who stood to lose large sums of money over books printed in Edinburgh and sold in London. The English poet Samuel Johnson disliked Donaldson, and criticised him, saying, "[Donaldson] is a fellow who takes advantage of the law to injure his brethren..."

While he made a fortune in his reprint business, he and others also bore the expense of legal actions in this regard. These included Osborne v Donaldson (1765), against publisher Thomas Osborne, and Millar v Donaldson (1765); in 1769, Donaldson sued Reid over printing-house practices. In 1773, London bookseller James Hinton and Edinburgh writer Alexander M'Conochie sued Donaldson and John Wood in Edinburgh, and John Meurose in Kilmarnock over copyright infringement of several titles. Donaldson and his brother John were appellants in Donaldson v Becket (1774), against the printers and booksellers Thomas Becket (or Beckett) (previously apprenticed to British publisher Andrew Millar), Peter Abraham de Hondt, John Rivington, William Johnson, William Strahan, Thomas Longman, William Richardson, John Richardson, Thomas Lowndes, Thomas Caslon, George Kearsley, Henry Baldwin, William Owen, Thomas Davies, and Thomas Cadell. The case resulted in a ruling by the British House of Lords on the issue of perpetual common law copyright and copyright as a statute that could have a limited duration.

James Boswell was Donaldson's advocate in at least three of these lawsuits, Donaldson v Beckett, Donaldson v Reid and Hinton v Donaldson. Boswell, best known as Samuel Johnson's biographer, referred to Donaldson as "the prodigious Vendor of Literature", and the "Great Donaldson". Donaldson published several of Boswell's works.

== Personal life ==
It is unlikely that Donaldson is the same Alexander Donaldson mentioned as a founding member of the Royal Society of Edinburgh as that gentleman is described as a Professor of Oriental Languages at Edinburgh University. He retired in 1789 and bought Broughton Hall, located a mile to the northeast of central Edinburgh, which had been the residence of Archibald Stewart, Lord Provost of Edinburgh (1745). He died at Broughton Hall in 1794, leaving an estate valued at £100,000. He is buried in Greyfriars Churchyard.

His surviving son, James (1751–1830), inherited the Edinburgh business. He, too, died at Broughton Hall, in 1830. James was the benefactor of Donaldson's Hospital after his death.

== Partial works ==
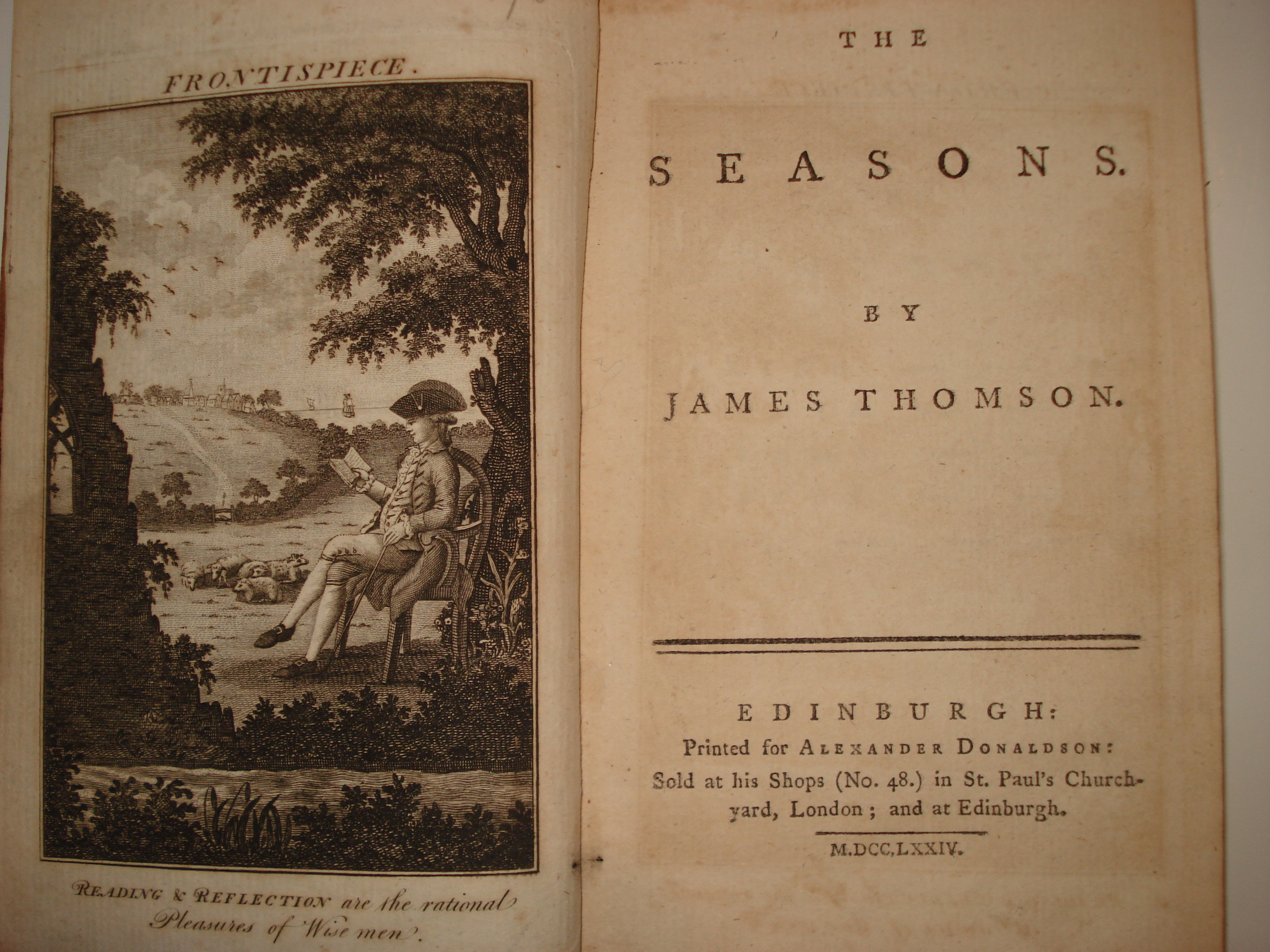
Frontispiece of James Thomson's The Seasons, published by Alexander Donaldson

- – (1758). A catalogue of curious and valuable books, to be disposed of by way of sale, (the lowest price being marked at [sic] each book), at the shop of Alexander Donaldson, ... Edinburgh. The sale to begin on Monday the 12th day of June 1758. Edinburgh: printed in the year.
- Donaldson, A., Reid, J., & Guyse, J. (1761). The universal Bible: Containing the sacred text at large of the old and new testaments, with parallel scriptures. London: Printed for S. Crowder ... and J. Coote.
- – (1762). A catalogue of valuable books, In different languages and faculties, which will begin to be sold, by way of sale, at the Shop of Alexander Donaldson, Edinburgh, on Wednesday 16 June 1762, and to continue selling for three months. The lowest price, for ready money, is marked at each article in the catalogue. In this collection are the following books, all the best editions. Folio. Grv̆ius's the saurus ant. 45 vols Montfaucon's antiquities, 7 vols Churchill's voyages, 6 vols Harris's voyages, 2 vols Purchas's pilgrims, 5 vols Pocock's travels, 2 vols Bayle's dictionary, 5 vols biographia britannica, 5 vols De Lisle's atlas the general atlas Moh's geography, 2 vols -atlas major senex's atlas Bacon's works, 3 vols Causĭ musŭm Romanum, 2 vols Dictionnaire de Moreri, 8 tomes Johnson's English dictionary, 2 vols chambers's dictionary, 2 vols supplement to chambers, 2 vols Savary's dictionary of trade, 2 vols Miller's gardener's dictionary Ainsworth's large dictionary, 2 vols Calasio's Heb. concordance, 4 vols SuidL̆exicon, Kusteri, 3 vols Warner's church-history, 2 vols Boyle's lecture-sermons, 3 vols Patrick, Lowth, and Whitby, 6 vols Baxter's works, 4 vols Barrow's works, 2 vols Tillotson's works, 3 vols Dr. Scott's works, 2 vols Henry's commentary, 6 vols Dr. Clarke's large Bible (see the list continued on the other side.) As the books are now in order, they may be seen and bespoke every day betwixt and the time of sale. The first who speaks for a book, must always be preferred. Catalogues to be had, gratis, at the Shop of A. Donaldson; and it is intreated that gentlemen, in town or country, will call or send for them. Edinburgh: [s.n.].
- – (1764). Some thoughts on the state of literary property Humbly submitted to the consideration of the public. London: printed for Alexander Donaldson; sold at his shop.
- – (1768). A select collection of poems,: From the most approved authors. In two volumes. Vol. I [ -II]. Edinburgh: Printed by A. Donaldson, and sold at his shops in London and Edinburgh.
- – (1778). Books sold cheap: By Alexr Donaldson, at No. 48, in St. Paul's Church-Yard, the corner next Cheapside, London. London: A. Donaldson.
