= Millar v Taylor =

English legal case concerning common law copyright

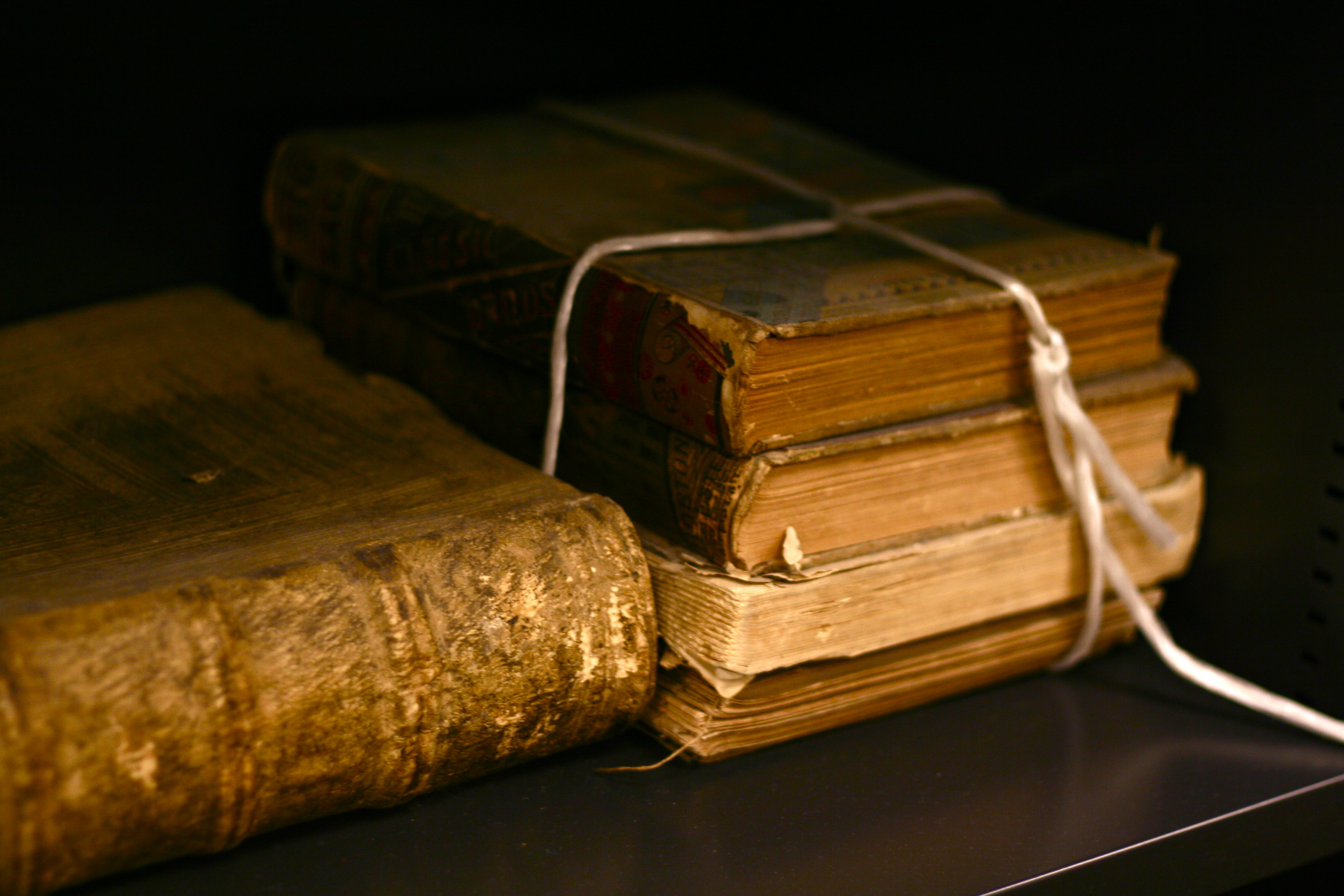
- Decided: 20 April 1769
- Citation: 4 Burr. 2303, 98 ER 201

Court membership
- Judges sitting: Lord Mansfield, Aston J, Willes J, Sir Joseph Yates

Keywords
- copyright, monopolies

Millar v Taylor (1769) 4 Burr. 2303, 98 ER 201 is an English court decision that held there is a perpetual common law copyright and that no works ever enter the public domain. It represented a major victory for the bookseller monopolies.

== Facts ==
Andrew Millar was a bookseller who in 1729, had purchased the publishing rights to James Thomson's poem The Seasons. After the term of the exclusive rights granted under the Statute of Anne expired, Robert Taylor began publishing his own competing publication, which contained Thomson's poem.

Following the creation of the first statutory copyright law in 1710 (via the Statute of Anne), as rights belonging to an author (rather than to printers or publishers), the lapse of the Licensing Act 1662 in 1695 and Parliament's refusal to renew the licensing regime (1695), the practice of the English publishing oligopoly had not changed much. Though the purpose of the new law was to break up the monopolies that had been created by the English Crown – which had served, in part, as a basis for the previous English Civil War – there had been relatively little success in weakening the hold of the Stationers' Company over the publishing industry. Despite the Statute of Anne's changes to the statutory law, some publishers continued to claim perpetual publishing rights under common law. Starting in the 1740s, London booksellers presented that argument in a series of court cases, after they had failed to convince Parliament to extend the statutory term of copyright.

== Judgment ==
The Court of the King's Bench, led by Lord Mansfield (with Aston and Willes JJ concurring in judgment, Sir Joseph Yates dissenting), sided with the publishers, finding that common law rights were not extinguished by the Statute of Anne. Under Mansfield's ruling, the publishers had a perpetual common law right to publish a work for which they had acquired the rights. Thus, no amount of time would cause the work to pass to the public. The ruling essentially found that some works would have a perpetual term of copyright, by holding that when the statutory rights granted by the statute expired, the publisher was still left with common law rights to the work. Although this would greatly extend the control of the rights holder this would not extinguish the public domain since there would still be works unaffected by the ruling, and the public domain extends to unprotected elements in protected works. Millar died shortly after the ruling, and it was never appealed.

As an English court, however, the court's decision did not extend to Scotland, where a reprint industry continued to thrive. The existence of a common-law copyright, however, was later rejected by a Scottish court in Hinton v Donaldson. Perpetual copyright was ultimately resolved against the London publishing monopolies in the landmark case of Donaldson v Beckett. Despite being overturned, the case of Millar v Taylor remains an important case in the development and history of copyright law.

== See also ==
- Copyright
- Copyright law of the United Kingdom
- History of copyright
- List of leading legal cases in copyright law
