= James Muirhead =

James Muirhead may refer to:

- James Muirhead (judge) (1925–1999), Australian judge
- James Fullarton Muirhead (1853–1934), Scottish writer of travel guides
- James Muirhead (swimmer) (born 1953), British Paralympian
- James Muirhead (cricketer) (born 1993), Australian cricketer
- James Patrick Muirhead (1813–1898), Scottish advocate and author
- James Muirhead (scholar) (1830–1899), professor of civil law at the University of Edinburgh
