= Finlay Dun =

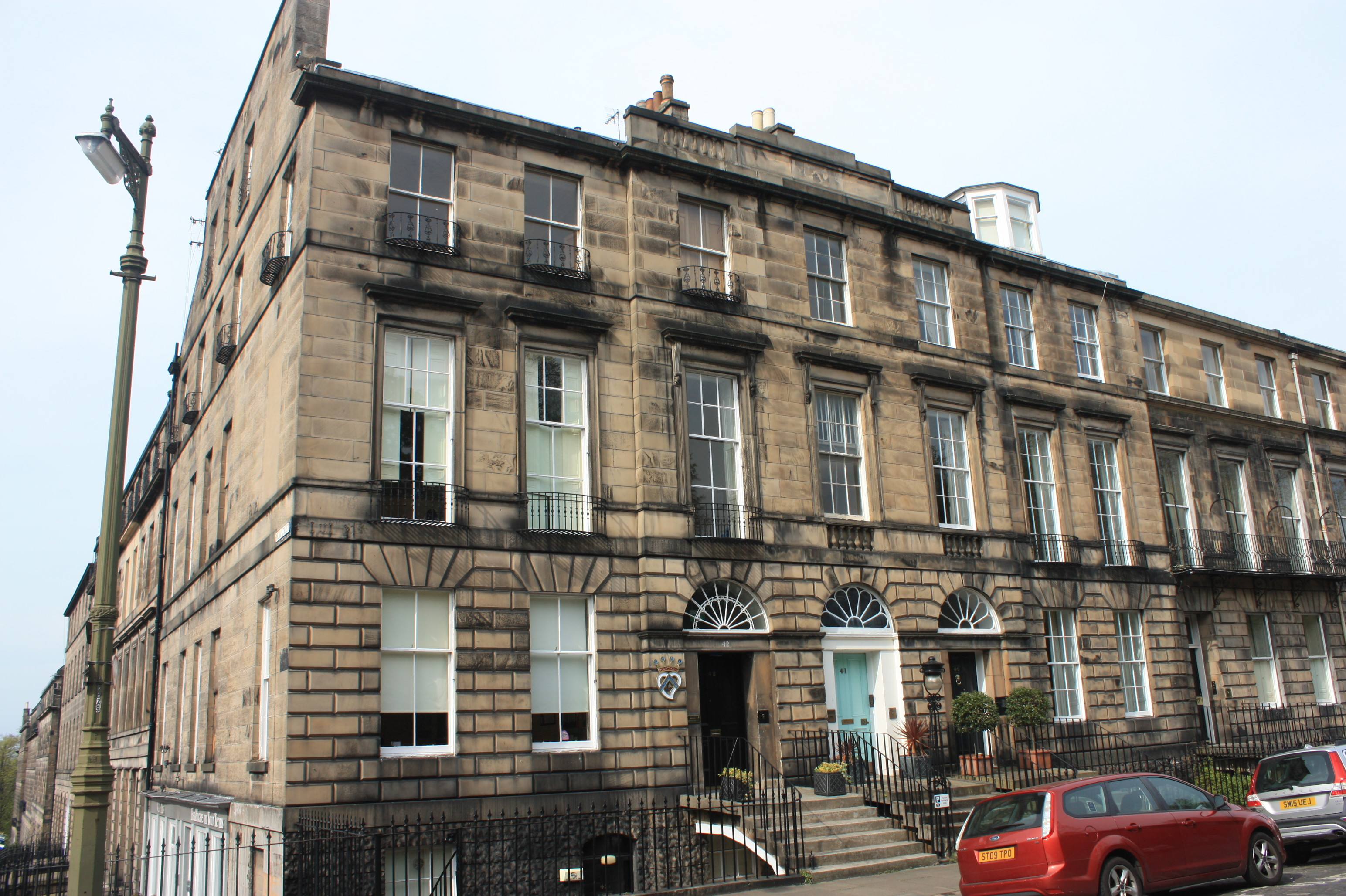
41 Heriot Row, Edinburgh

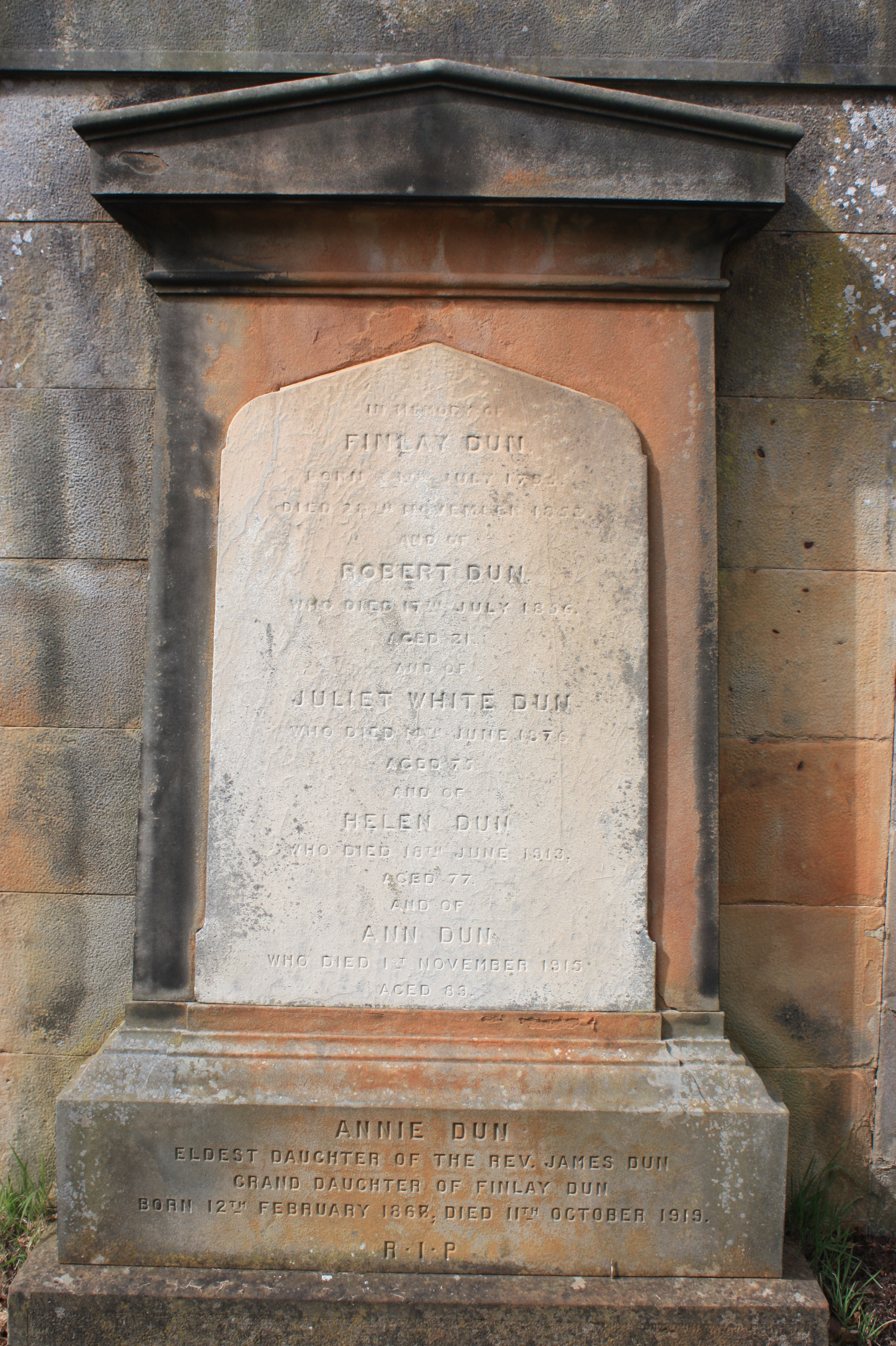
The grave of Finlay Dun, Dean Cemetery, Edinburgh

Finlay Dun (24 February 1795 – 28 November 1853) was a Scottish art teacher, singer and musician.

== Life ==
Dun was born at Aberdeen, 24 February 1795. He was educated at the Perth Grammar School and at the University of Edinburgh, but, his musical tastes developing, went to Paris, where he studied the violin under Pierre Baillot. He next went to Milan, and afterwards accepted an engagement as first viola player in the orchestra of the San Carlo Theatre at Naples. Either at Paris or Milan he had lessons from Aleksander Mirecki, and at Naples he made the acquaintance of Girolamo Crescentini, with whom he studied singing.

On returning to Scotland Dun settled at Edinburgh, where he spent the remainder of his life, occupied in teaching the violin, composition, and singing. He only appears as a householder in 1829, at which time he is living in a flat at 6 Howe Street in the Second New Town.

He published a collection of solfeggi with an introduction on vocal expression in 1829, but his name is best known by the collections of Scottish songs which he edited. He was also the composer of two symphonies (neither of which was published), of several glees and songs, and some unimportant dance music.

He later lived at 41 Heriot Row, a large Georgian upper level flat in Edinburgh's New Town, facing Queen Street Gardens.

He died suddenly at Edinburgh, 28 November 1853. He is buried in Dean Cemetery in western Edinburgh. The grave lies on the north wall of the original cemetery, backing onto the first northern extension.
