= Booksellers' Bill =

The Booksellers's Bill was a 1774 bill introduced into the Parliament of Great Britain in the wake of the important copyright case of Donaldson v. Beckett.

In Donaldson a perpetual common law copyright was denied to booksellers and it was held that copyright was a creation of statute and could be limited in its duration. As a result, booksellers sought to have the duration of their copyright extended to 14 years. Under UK parliamentary procedure, the bill passed the House of Commons but was defeated in the House of Lords and never became an act of parliament.

== Bibliography ==
- Rose, M. (1988). "The author as proprietor: Donaldson v. Becket and the genealogy of modern authorship". Representations. 23: 51–85. doi:10.1525/rep.1988.23.1.99p0230p (inactive 1 July 2025).
