= James Muirhead (scholar) =

Professor James Muirhead
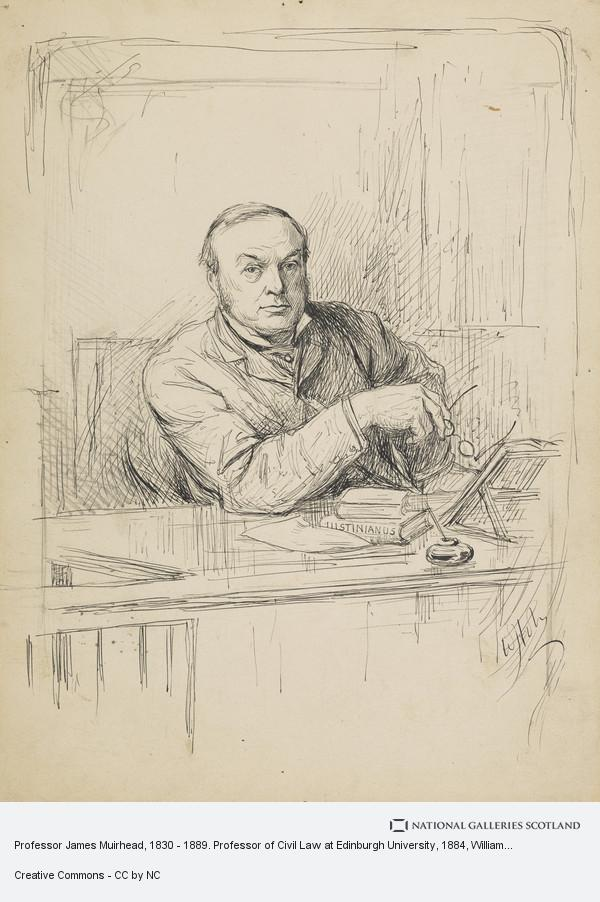
- Born: November 13, 1830; Edinburgh, Scotland
- Died: November 8, 1889 (aged 58); Edinburgh, Scotland
- Occupation: Professor of civil law at the University of Edinburgh
- Spouse: Jemima Locke Eastlake (Married 1857)
- Children: 1 son, 1 daughter.
- Parent(s): Claud Muirhead, Mary Watson

James Muirhead (13 November 1830 – 8 November 1889) was a 19th-century Scottish scholar and Professor of Civil Law at Edinburgh University. He gives his name to the Muirhead Prize in Civil Law at the University.

== Life ==
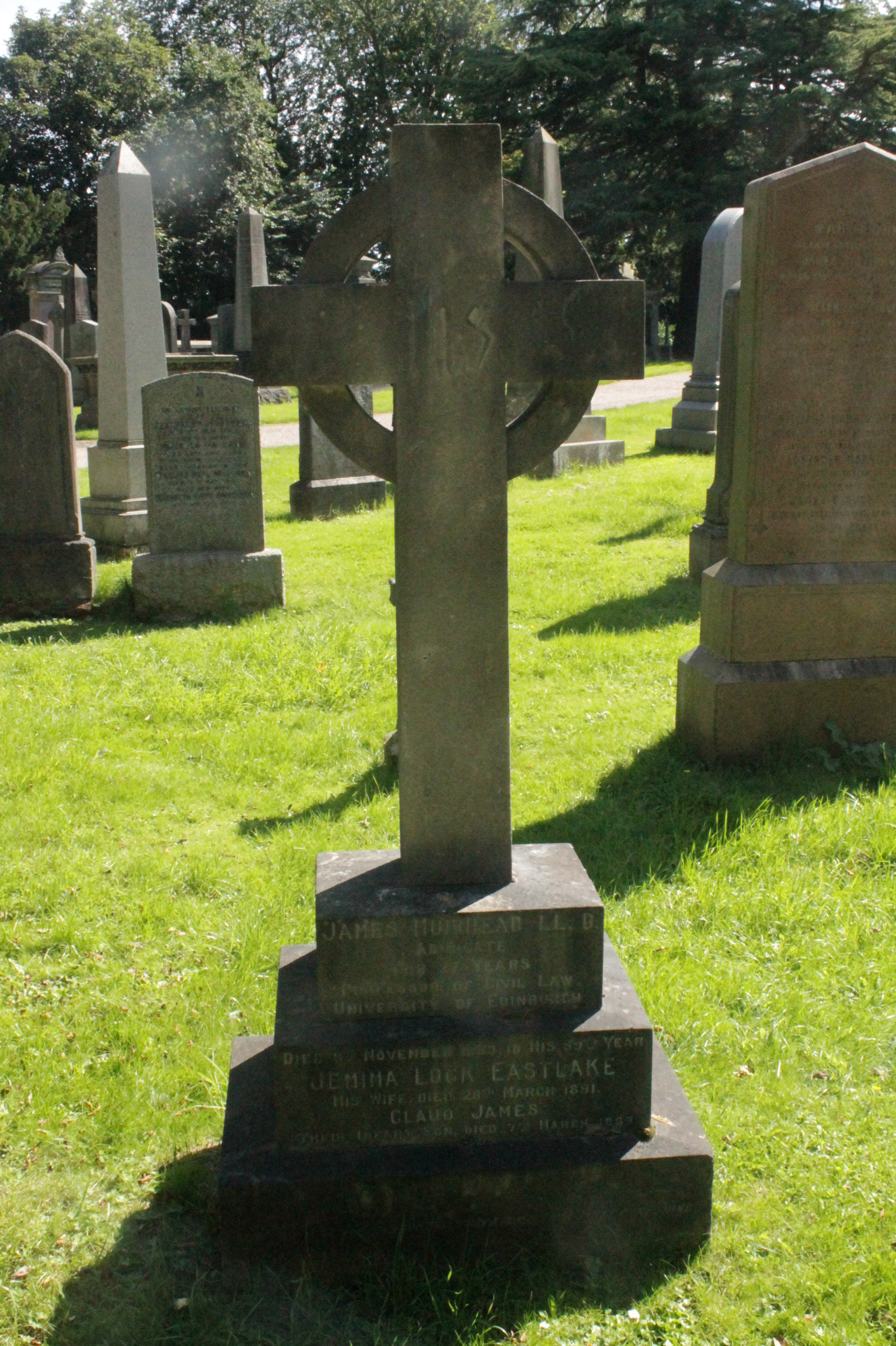
The grave of James Muirhead, Dean Cemetery

James Muirhead was born on at 7 Heriot Row, Edinburgh the eldest of five sons of Claud Muirhead, a printer and publisher of the Edinburgh Advertiser, and his wife Mary Watson. The family also owned the huge Gogar Park estate just west of the city (now serving as the Royal Bank of Scotland headquarters).

He was educated at Edinburgh Academy around 500m north of his home. He left in 1845 and was trained as a merchant in his father's premises in Leith and sent to Lille in north France to learn French. However he instead decided to study law and returned to Edinburgh to study at Edinburgh University then went to Germany in 1854 to complete his studies at Heidelberg University.

He was admitted into the Faculty of Advocates on 31 January 1857. He was admitted to the English bar on 6 June 1857. He is rare in having passed both the Scottish and English bar but this versatility equipped him to consider both Scots and English law in his teaching. In June 1862, aged 31, he was appointed Professor of Civil Law at Edinburgh University, at a salary of £250 per annum, replacing Prof Archibald Campbell Swinton. This important new role in the university was brought about by the Universities (Scotland) Act 1858 which created a new degree of LLB which was awarded as a postgraduate degree following receipt of an MA degree. The new component of "Civil Law" was based upon Roman Law which is a cornerstone of Scots Law, in comparison to English Law which hinges upon Norman law.

In 1862 he wrote an important legal treatise on the assimilation of Scots and English marriage laws (but these remain quite different). At this stage he lived at 61 Northumberland Street, close to his parental home.

He became ill in October 1889 shortly after attending the opening of Teviot Row Student Union. He died at his home, 2 Drumsheugh Gardens in Edinburgh's West End, on 8 November 1889. He is buried nearby in Dean Cemetery. The grave lies on the central east-west path just south of the large memorial to the 79th Highlanders.

He left a huge library of law books, many of German origin, which were sold after his death. Most were purchased by Manchester University but Edinburgh still retains some of the more valuable volumes.

== Family ==
He married Jemima Locke Eastlake (d.1891) in London on 14 April 1857. She was the daughter of George Eastlake of Plymouth, Depute Judge Advocate of the British Fleet, and niece of Charles Locke Eastlake. Charles' wife, Elizabeth Eastlake was a writer who lived in Edinburgh from 1842 to 1849. As a writer she had reason to frequent James's father Claud Muirhead. It is likely that this is how James met Jemima, when she was visiting her aunt in Edinburgh.

James and Jemima had one son and one daughter but the son (Claude James) died in infancy in 1869.

His brothers Claud Muirhead (1835–1910) and William Muir Muirhead (1838–1911) were both a doctor. All three were educated at Edinburgh Academy.

== Artistic recognition ==
His sketch portrait by William Brassey Hole is held at the Scottish National Portrait Gallery but is rarely displayed.
