= Heriot Row =

Street in Edinburgh, Scotland

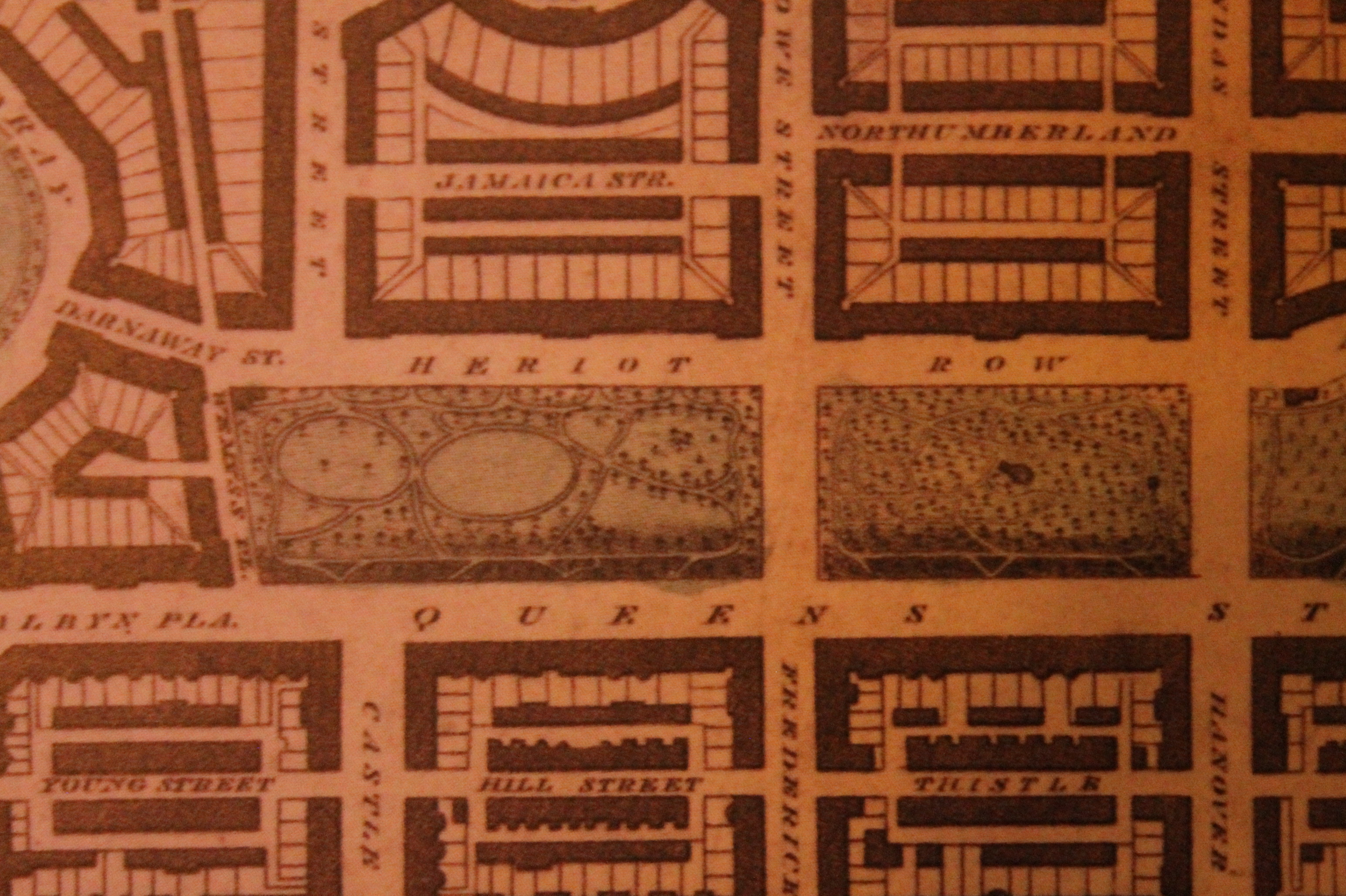
Heriot Row in 1836

Heriot Row is a highly prestigious street in central Edinburgh, virtually unchanged since its original construction in 1802. From its inception to the present day in remained a top address in the city and has housed the rich and famous of the city's elite for 200 years

== History ==
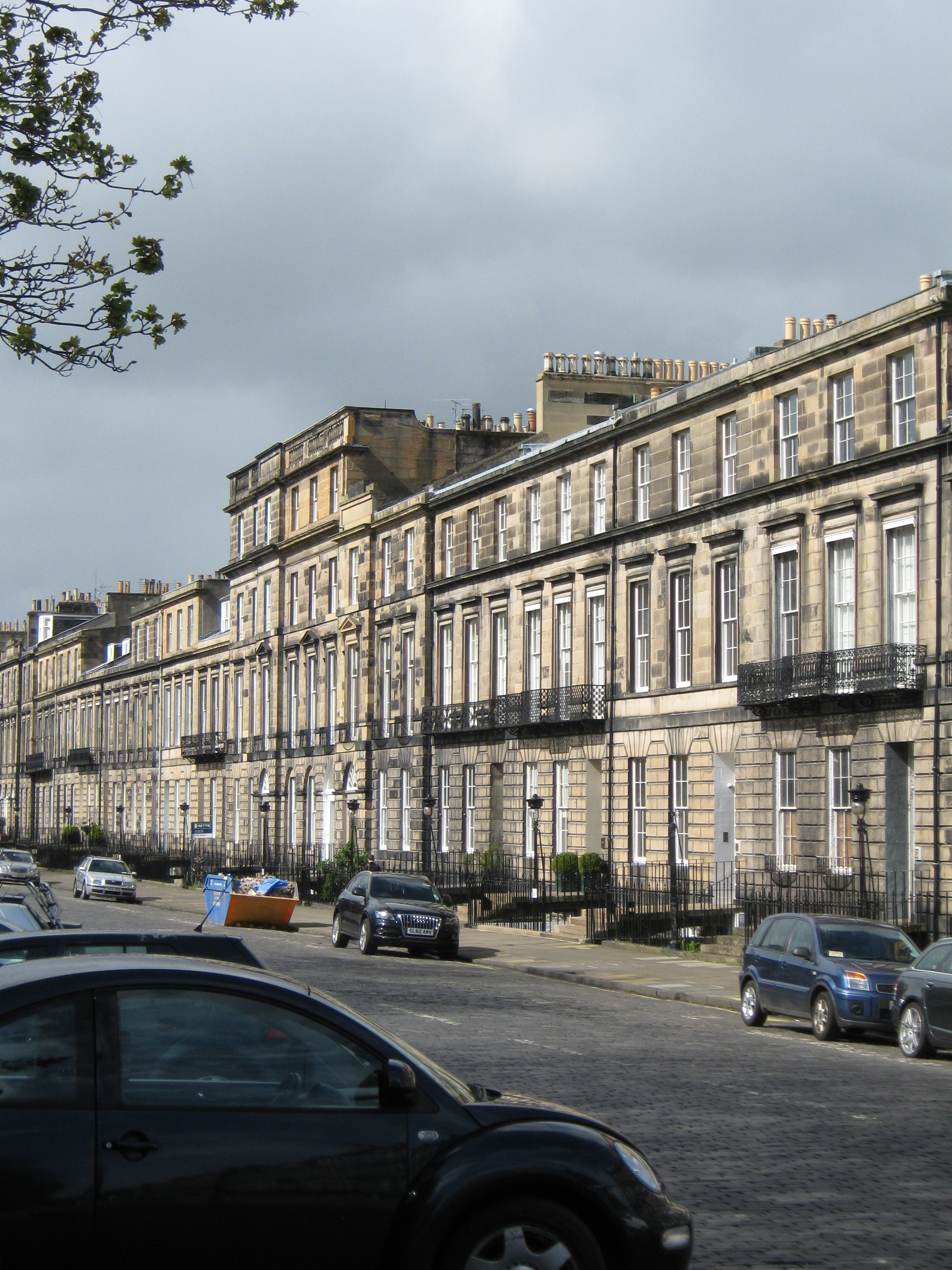
Heriot Row, Edinburgh

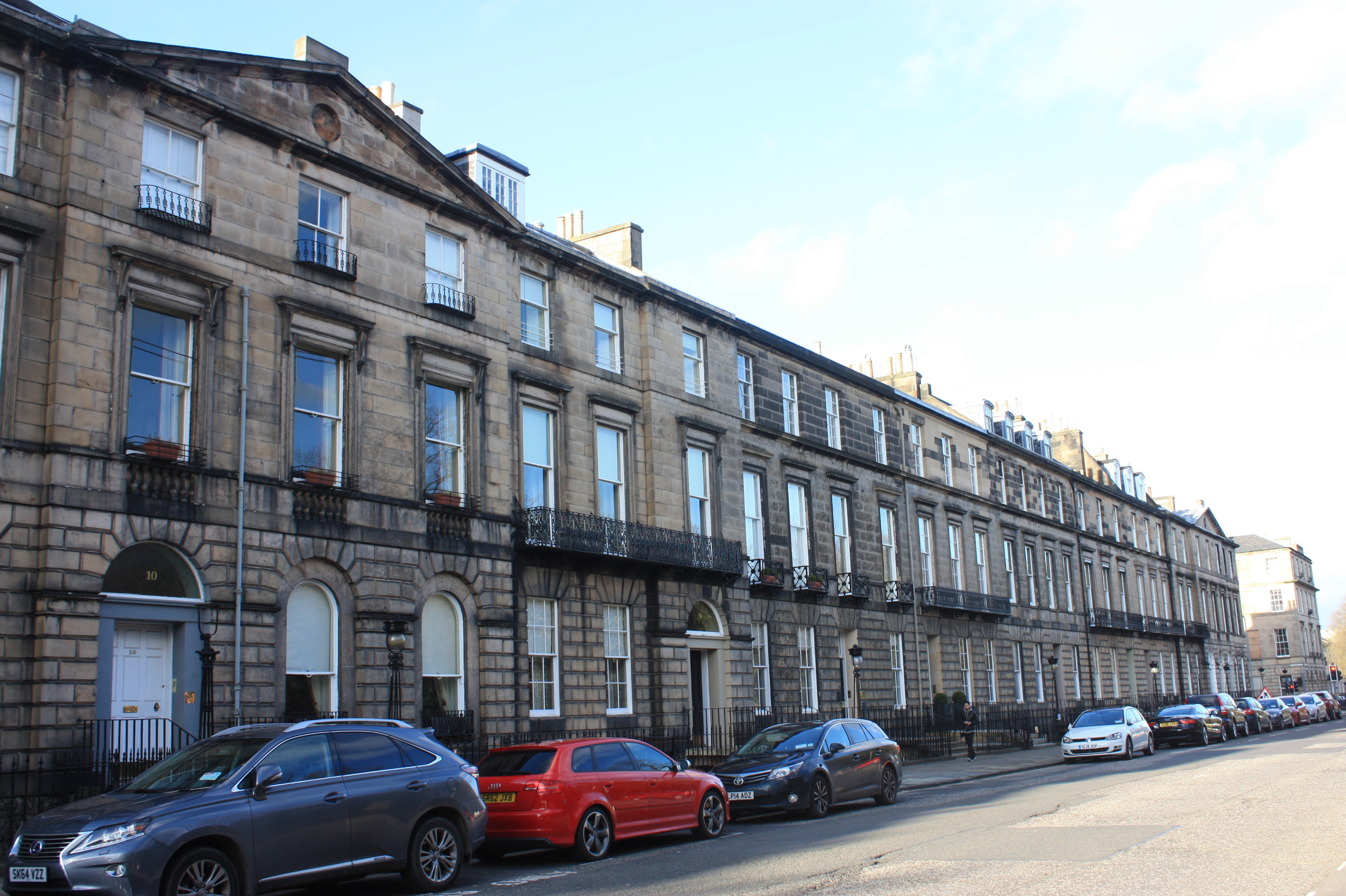
1-10 Heriot Row, Edinburgh

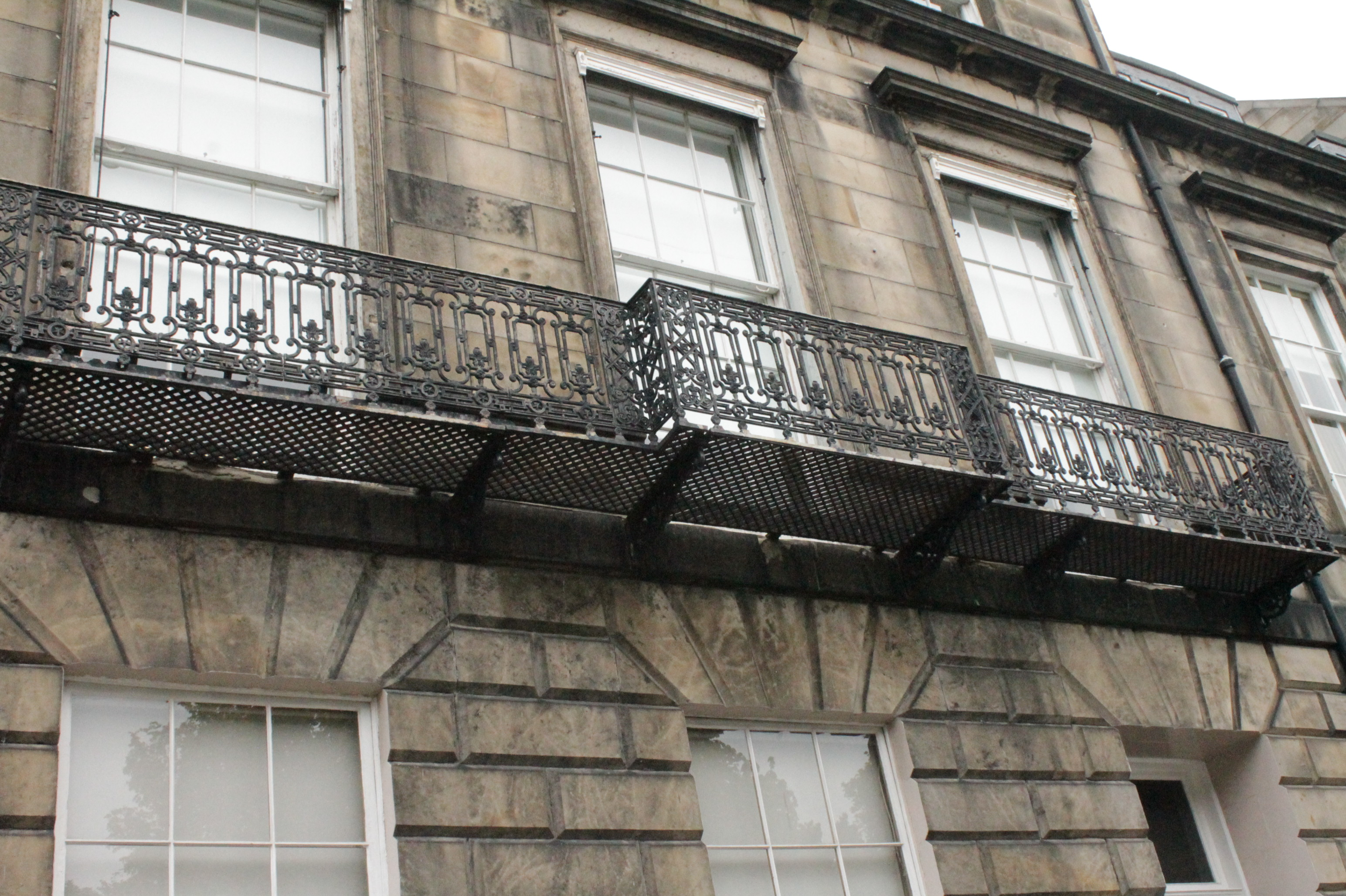
Ornamental balcony added on Heriot Row

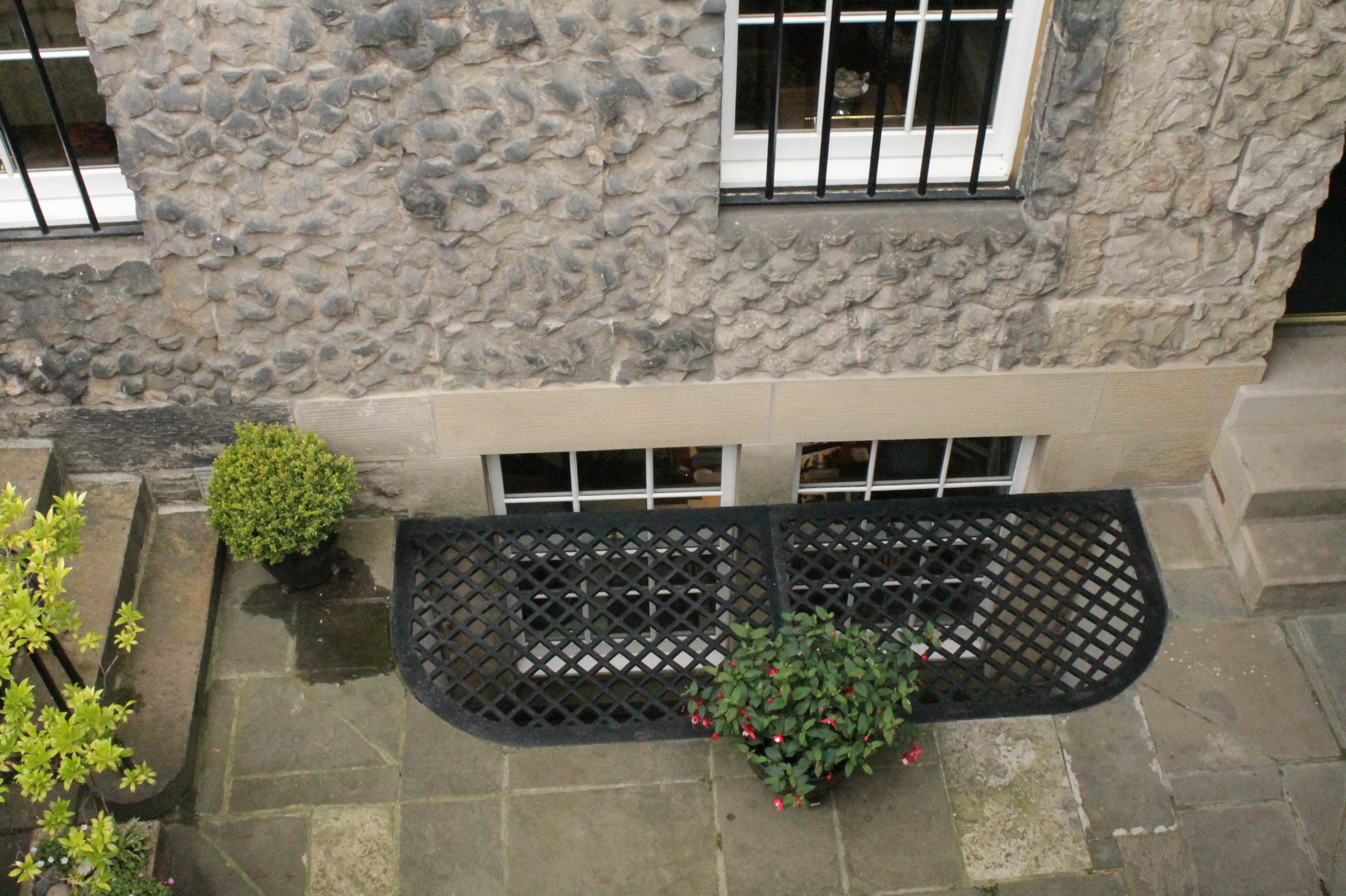
Basement and sub-basement levels Heriot Row

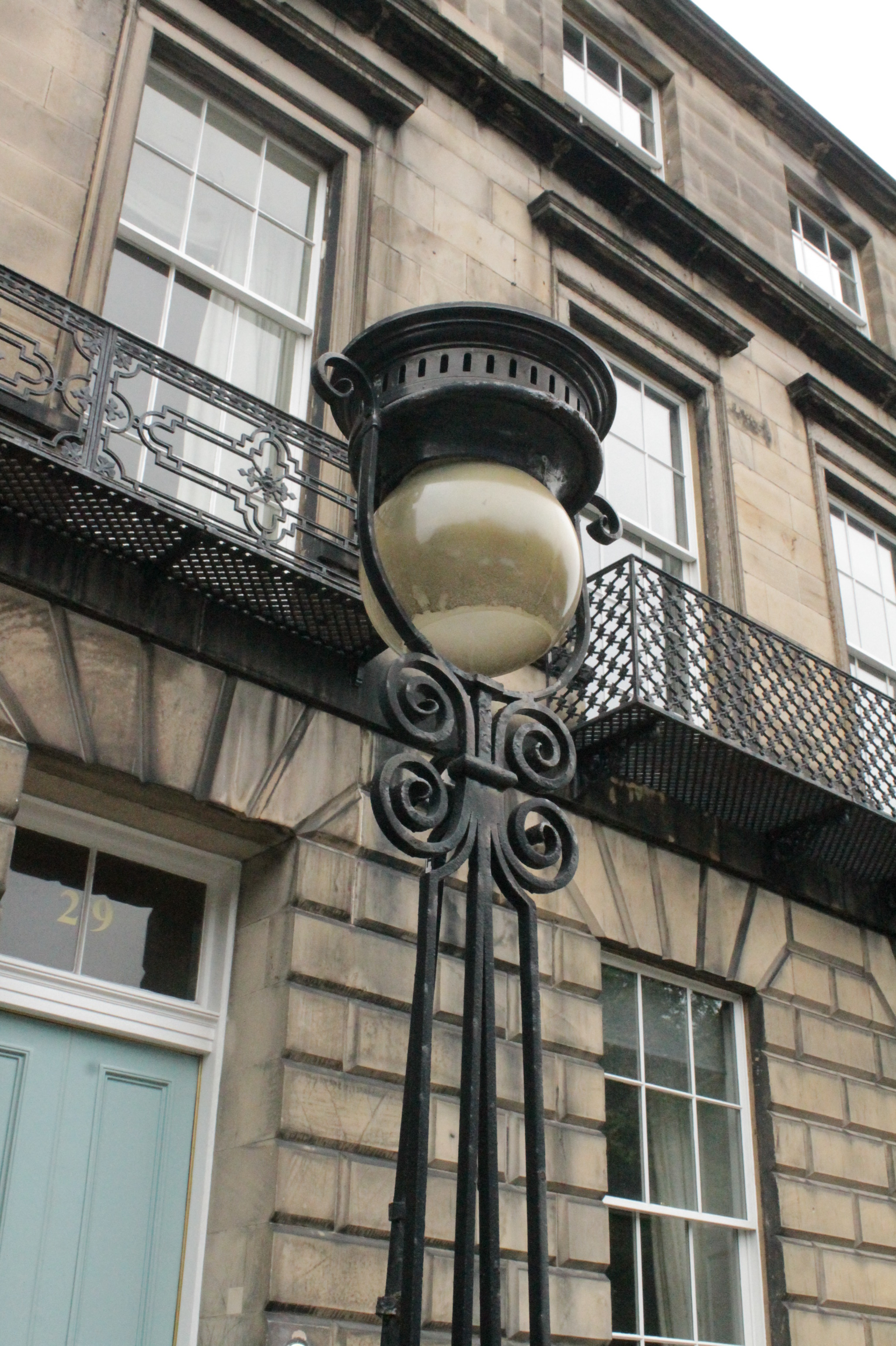
Ornamental lamp, Heriot Row

Following the success of Edinburgh's First New Town (from Princes Street to Queen Street) it was proposed to expand the concept northwards onto what was then fairly open land largely owned by the Heriot Trust. The scheme was designed by William Sibbald with the young Robert Reid working mainly on the proportions of the palace type frontages. The project was built by John Paton and David Lind. The two main sections were complete by 1808. The short western section (linking to Darnaway Street then the Moray Estate was slightly later and was executed in 1817 to the design of Thomas Bonnar being built by William & Wallace.

The original concept was for two palace-fronted blocks: Dundas Street to Howe Street; and Howe Street to India Street. The short westmost section was originally planned as part of Darnaway Street and only after construction was it deemed part of Heriot Row.

The original design concept was exceptionally modest: two storey and basement other than the end pavilions and central pavilions, which were set at three storey. Bonnar's west section was all three storeys. In 1864 David Bryce drew up a plan to add a third storey to all the western (central) section, but as this was in mixed ownership not all owners added this. The end result is an irretrievable ragged skyline to the west end of the central section (but the east end of the central section was successfully extended).

The terraces run from Dundas Street to Gloucester Lane, the latter being off the New Town rectangular grid as it is a medieval lane linking Stockbridge to St Cuthbert's Church (which is also of medieval foundation). The lane marks a parish boundary.

== Form ==
The four corner blocks of the two main terraces were built as flats rather than houses. Their standard design is a triple doored pavilion block facing Heriot Row. The central doors lead to a common stair, the outer doors (of the triple) are larger and grander ground floor and basement houses. The short western terrace does not fit the pattern. It has one ground floor and basement house, but the upper flats are entered from the side (2 India Street). The westmost block breaks the "rules" further, being wider than the others but not built as flats.

As designed the houses between the pavilions were two storey and basement, with a concealed sub-basement. Most now have an extra floor added as per the Bryce scheme (see above). Those which were not so extended mainly have dormer extensions.

Apart from the pavilion ends all houses are three bays wide, with the exception of 6, 8 and 14 which are four bays wide. These discrepancies add to the fact that the original design was not really symmetrical, but gave an overall impression of symmetry in the form of an entire "palace block" with each person living in a small section of the palace.

Every house entrance is accessed from a set of steps leading to a stone platform which spans over the basement area. Hidden beneath the pavement are cellar spaces, originally used for coal storage. All houses (but not all flats) have a rear garden at sub-basement level.

The street lighting appears authentic but has a complex history. The original lights were added in the 1860s (sixty years after construction) to a design by John Kippen Watson FRSE. The lights were removed and replaced by conventional electric street lighting but restored as an electric version of the original gas-lamps using moulds made by the Edinburgh New Town Conservation Trust in the early 1980s.

Cast-iron balconies, despite being common, were not part of the original design and were added on an ad hoc basis mainly in the period 1830 to 1890. This is why the design of the balconies varies from house to house. The fashion for full length windows at first floor (beginning around 1860) causes further subtle change, dropping many windows and making them five panes high rather than four panes as designed.

== Queen Street Gardens ==
Queen Street Gardens is divided into three sections, two of which lie opposite Heriot Row (the eastern section is opposite Abercromby Place). The gardens form some of the collection of New Town Gardens.

John Ainslie's map of 1804 shows the gardens prior to their becoming a large common pleasure garden serving both Queen Street and Heriot Row properties (a function it still serves). The gardens were formalised as a single communal (but private) space by 1836.

The east end of the garden opposite 1 Heriot Row was designed by the artist Andrew Wilson.

The central section of garden contains a small pond with a central island. This gives credence to the story that it inspired Robert Louis Stevenson to write "Treasure Island" as his former house looks straight at the island.

The small "Grecian temple" in the eastern garden seems to deceive most people and many bizarre stories exist explaining its "history". It has no history. It is disguising a gas governor and was erected in 1988 by British Gas. It is constructed of stone-coloured glass reinforced plastic.

== Heriot Row Residents ==
Were the blue plaque scheme carried out on Heriot Row it would look like an attack of the measles as almost every house merits two or three plaques. Instead there is a general agreement that plaques are not appropriate on this street. An explanatory panel at the end of the street might prove both useful and more appropriate. The street numbers from east to west, starting at Dundas Street.

- 1 - Peter Spalding, philanthropist (first occupant)
- 2 - Major Cecil Cameron. spymaster
- 3 - James Ballantyne, Scott's publisher
- 4 - Rear Admiral William Duddingston (first occupant)
- 4 - Elizabeth Grant, diarist
- 4 - Christopher Johnston, Lord Sands, law lord
- 4 - (as an office) John Poulson
- 6 - Henry Mackenzie, author
- 6 - William Gloag, Lord Kincairney, law lord
- 7 - James Muirhead, scholar and book collector and his father Claud Muirhead printer
- 7 - William Smith Greenfield, anatomist
- 8 - Rev Thomas Randall Davidson, minister of Tolbooth parish in St Giles Cathedral
- 10 - Sir Byrom Bramwell, brain surgeon
- 10 - Lionel Daiches, lawyer
- 11 - Robert Hodshon Cay, advocate
- 12 - James Duncan, surgeon associated with chloroform
- 12 - James Gulliver, entrepreneur
- 13 - George Ballingall, surgeon
- 13 - Dr John Fraser, commissioner of lunacy
- 13 - John Phin, author
- 15 - Campbell Riddell colonial administrator of NSW
- 15 - Robert Munro, 1st Baron Alness MP
- 15 - James Frederick Ferrier, lawyer and poet. Visitors would have included his paternal aunt Susan Ferrier and paternal uncle John Wilson
- 17 - Thomas Stevenson and his son Robert Louis Stevenson, author
- 17 - Patrick Balfour, Baron Kinross
- 21 - John Lessels, architect
- 24 - Thomas Mackenzie, Lord Mackenzie, law lord
- 26 - Thomas Clouston, physician
- 27 - Alexander Irving, Lord Newton, law lord
- 28 - Sir Andrew Douglas Maclagan, surgeon
- 29 - Sir William Newbigging, surgeon, and his son Patrick Newbigging
- 30 - James Balfour Paul, Lord Lyon
- 30 - George Patton, Lord Glenalmond, law lord
- 31 - Jemima Blackburn, artist and author
- 31 - James Clerk Maxwell, scientist
- 31 - Alexander Ure politician and judge
- 31 - Alexander Asher, lawyer and politician
- 32 - Charles Shaw, Lord Kilbrandon, law lord
- 32 - George Deas, Lord Deas, law lord
- 32 - William Campbell Johnston, lawyer and cricketer
- 37 - Alexander Graham Munro, artist
- 38 - James Ormiston Affleck, surgeon
- 39 - Sir James Patten-McDougall
- 40 - Patrick Shaw, lawyer
- 41 - Finlay Dun, musician
- 44 - Rev Archibald Alison (author)
- 46 - Sir Archibald Alison, 1st Baronet
- 47 - Sir William Dunbar, 7th Baronet

=== Non-Residential Functions ===
- 19 - Midlothian and Peebles Lunacy Board (early 20th century)
- 19 - Seaforth Highlanders Association
