= Hinton v Donaldson =

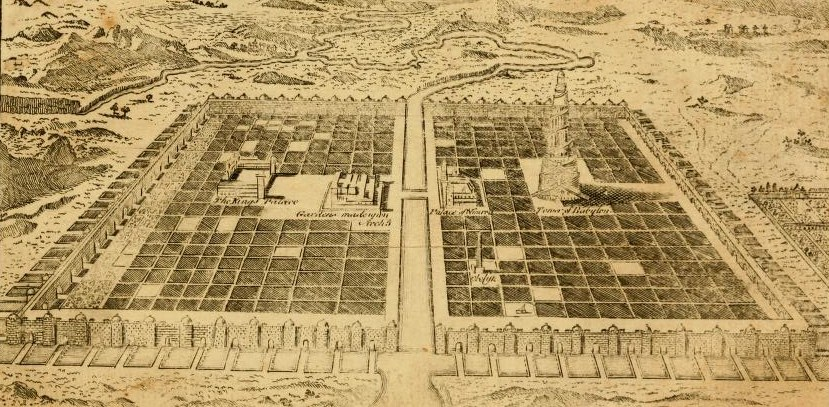
- A Plan of the City of Babylon from the 1795 edition of Stackhouse's The New History of the Holy Bible
- Court: Court of Session
- Decided: 28 July 1773
- Citation: [1773] 5 Brn 508

Keywords
- Copyright

Hinton v Donaldson (1773, 5 Brn 508) is a Scots copyright law case, in which the Court of Session rejected the claim that copyright existed beyond the limited term introduced under the Statute of Anne.

== Background ==
The Statute of Anne was passed in 1710, as the United Kingdom's first copyright statute. Under the statute, authors (and their publishers) had the sole authority to reproduce and sell their works for a period of 14 years. The term could be renewed if the author was still alive. Thomas Stackhouse, an English theologian, wrote New History of the Holy Bible in 1738. His copyright, therefore, had expired in 1752.

A London bookseller, John Hinton printed and profitably sold the second edition of the book, although the statutory copyright term had expired. Scottish bookseller, Alexander Donaldson, John Wood, and James Meurose were printing a different edition of Stackhouse's book. Hinton sued the three booksellers before the Court of Session, arguing that he had acquired a common law right of copyright, although the statutory term had ended. He claimed that because he had acquired the copyright from Stackhouse through a conveyance, he had a perpetual property right.

James Boswell, who was a friend of Donaldson, represented the defender-booksellers.

== Decision ==
Eleven out of twelve judges found (with Lord Monboddo dissenting) that an author had no property rights in a book, but only the temporary rights which had been granted under the Statute. There was no common law right of copyright.

Lord Monboddo, however, decided that once a copyright was created under the Statute, it continued in perpetuity.

The case influenced the subsequent House of Lords ruling in Donaldson v Beckett (1774).
