= Rose Street =

Street in Edinburgh, United Kingdom

Coordinates: 55°57′7.10″N 3°12′6.03″W

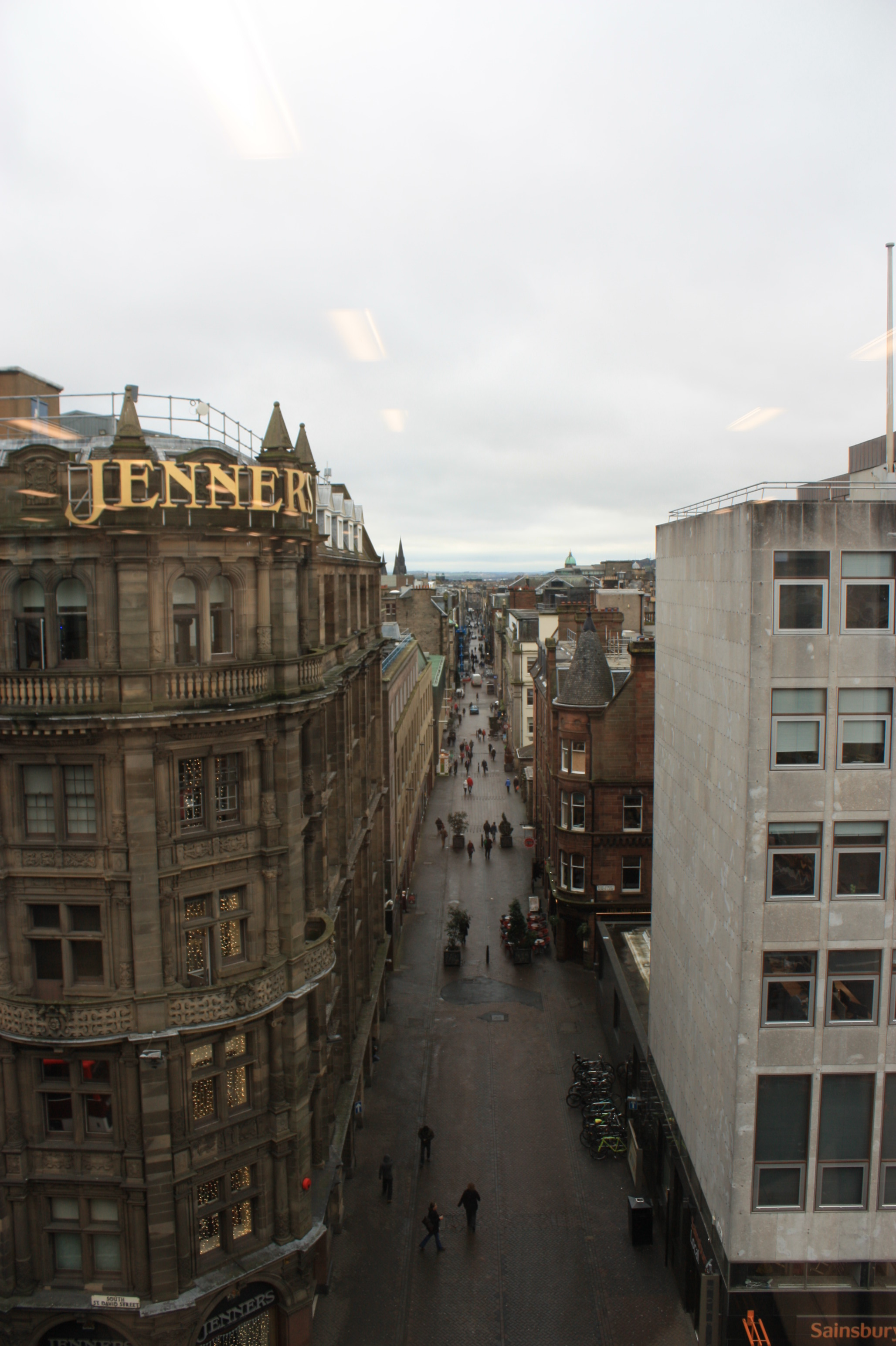
Rose St, Edinburgh as seen from Standard Life Building on St Andrew Square

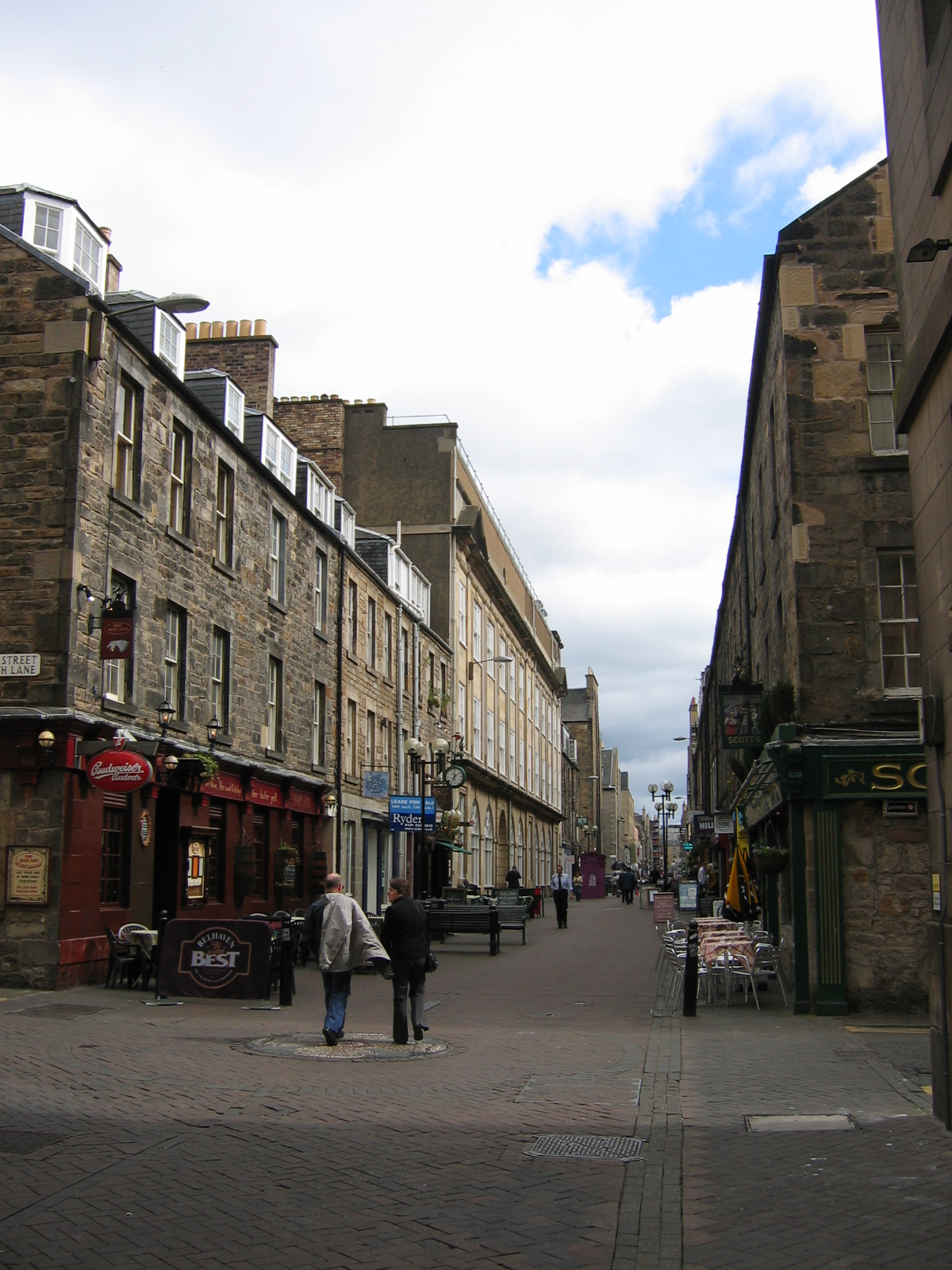
Rose Street in the New Town of Edinburgh

Rose Street is a street in the New Town of Edinburgh, Scotland. It is a narrow street running parallel between Princes Street and George Street. Today, it is principally a shopping street, however, it is well known for its many bars and public houses.

== History ==
Rose Street was built from 1770 to 1781 as a secondary street running east to west from St Andrew Square to Charlotte Square on the south side of George Street. Its name "Rose" represents England as Thistle Street represents Scotland. Originally built as three-storey vernacular rubble houses it was not as grand as its surrounding streets. Built wholly as housing, by 1820 it was becoming a shopping street at ground floor. This change continued further and by the mid 20th century it was totally in shopping use (and also multiple bars). The nature of the street changing drastically in 1972 when multiple blocks were replaced by a standardised design, incorporating a projecting scalloped concrete canopy as part of an organised reconstruction by the Council, designed by Ian Burke Associates.

Notable individual buildings include the "Kenilworth Bar" by Thomas P. Marwick (1899) and the Eagle Buildings by George Washington Browne (1905).

The side lanes Rose Street Lanes North and Rose Street Lanes South act as service lanes to George Street and Princes Street respectively.

In 1973 the street began to be pedestrianised when the section between Castle Street and Frederick Street became the first pedestrianised street in the city.

Rose Street is also the home to the BT Rose Street Telephone Exchange, which connects much of the telecommunications infrastructure for the west side of the New Town of Edinburgh.

== Bars and drinking history ==
Rose Street was nicknamed the "Amber Mile" by tourism promoters (later dropped) due to the many bars and public houses along it. This was partly in reference to the Royal Mile, but was misleading since it is neither an English nor a Scots mile in length.

Whilst some of the traditional pubs here have given way to ones with humorous names such as Dirty Dicks and Filthy McNastys, in keeping with its many Walter Scott references, Rose Street in Edinburgh has a bar called the "Kenilworth", along with one named after Scott's house, the "Abbotsford". Milne's Bar, also has literary connections, with one of its rooms nicknamed the "Little Kremlin", because many members of the Scottish Renaissance such as Hugh MacDiarmid would meet there. Pictures of various Scottish poets appear on the walls.

Rose Street, along with the history, is also famed for a rare drinking game: the Rose Street Challenge. "Rose Street has... oh, I don't know how many pubs," explained Billy Connolly on-stage in 1987. "It starts with the Abbottsford at one end, and I forget the names of the rest of them. I could hardly see the buggers. And the trick is to see how far along Rose Street you can get, having either a half pint or a pint. And in the morning you can see the marks, how far people got. There's wee bits of blood where people went, 'Oh, goodbye...' And the pavement pizza, you know? Some people carry bits of chalk – you know, rugby clubs – and they mark it: Falkirk Rugby Club made it to here."

== Retail ==
Many of Princes Street's main shops have back entrances into Rose Street, including Jenners, Boots and Next. It is also a minor shopping street in its own right, with a number of small businesses on it, such as hairdressers, a small Sainsbury's which closes late, northern access to Marks & Spencer, record shops such as Fopp, CEX (second hand electrical goods store) and a variety of shoe shops, clothing shops and novelty shops.

The street also accommodates service lanes for businesses on Princes, George and Rose Streets.

== See also ==
- Pub crawl
- Leith Walk
