= Donaldson's School =

Coordinates: 55°56′50.92″N 3°13′33.21″W

Location
- Preston Road; Linlithgow, EH49 6HZ; Scotland

Information
- Established: 1851; 175 years ago
- chief executive officer: Laura Battles
- Gender: Mixed
- Age: Five to 18
- Enrolment: 31
- Old location: West Coates, Edinburgh, EH12 5JJ
- Website: www.donaldsons.org.uk

Donaldson's School is Scotland's national school for the deaf. Originally situated in Edinburgh, it moved to a new location in Linlithgow in 2008. It is a residential and day school that provides education, therapy and care for pupils who are deaf or who have communication difficulties.

Donaldson's uses British Sign Language, Signed Supported English and spoken English, and caters for children and young people from five to 18 years. The curriculum is delivered by an interdisciplinary team of specialist teachers who are supported by specialist learning support assistants and residential care workers, providing round the clock education and care. The team includes: specialist teachers; speech and language therapists; a physiotherapist; and an occupational therapist.

== History ==
Donaldson's School was founded in 1851 and was housed in the Donaldson's Hospital Building in West Coates, Edinburgh. The school and building were paid for by Sir James Donaldson (1751–1830), who, for a time, was publisher of the Edinburgh Advertiser. The original benefaction was that there should be 200 boys and 200 girls, with special bursaries for poor children. Not all were deaf, although applications on behalf of deaf children were encouraged. From 1938, pupils were exclusively deaf. This benefaction was similar in style to the benefaction of George Watson, who founded and supported other schools in Edinburgh.

In 1938, Donaldson's School absorbed the Royal Institute for Deaf and Dumb, Edinburgh, which had been founded in 1824. The institute's headquarters in Henderson Row subsequently became part of the Edinburgh Academy.

Laura Battles was appointed Principal and chief executive officer of Donaldson's in October 2014. In 2015 she announced that the school had been incurring losses for several years and that the nursery section of the school would close.

== Premises ==
=== Donaldson's Hospital Building, Edinburgh ===
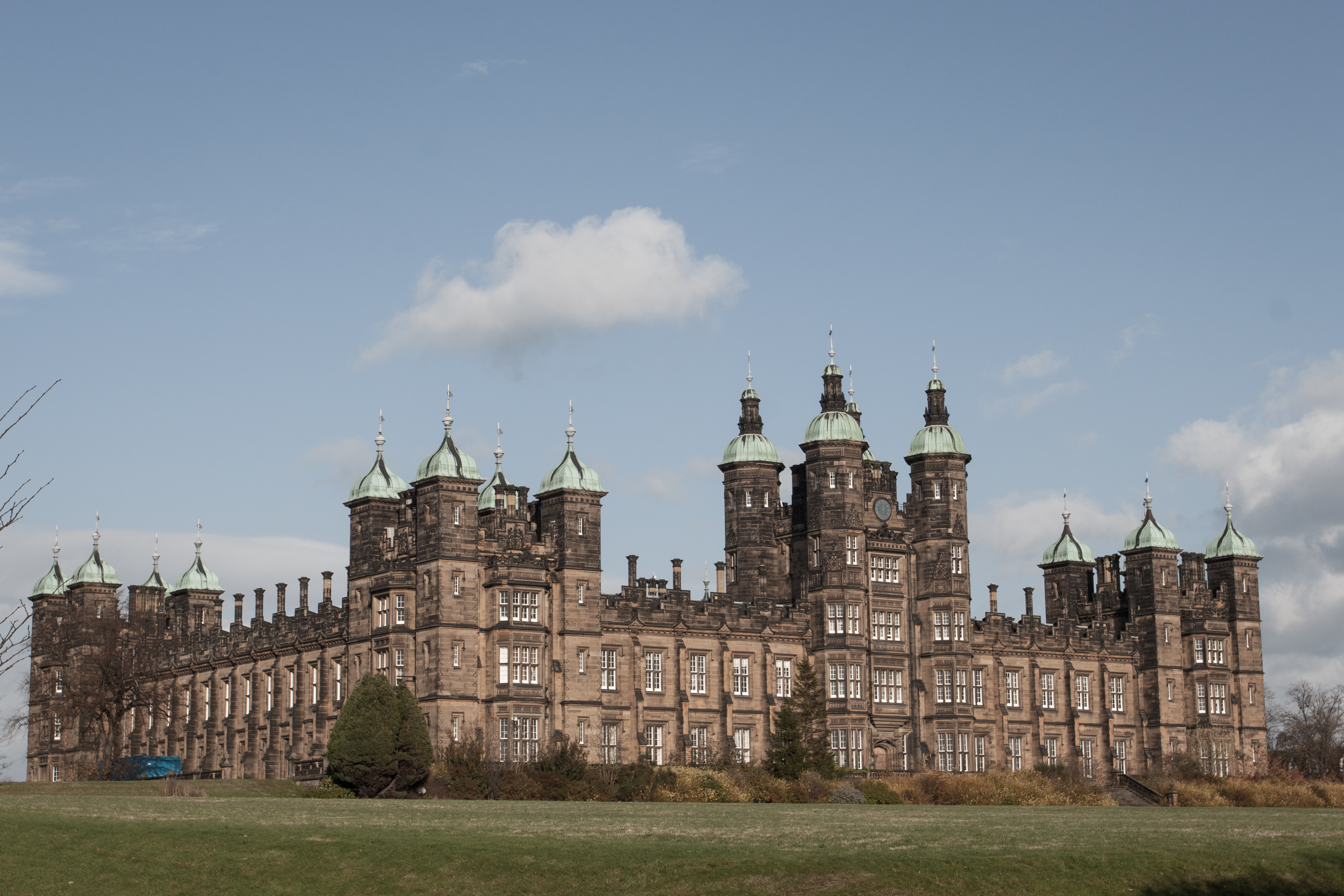
The former building in West Coates, Edinburgh

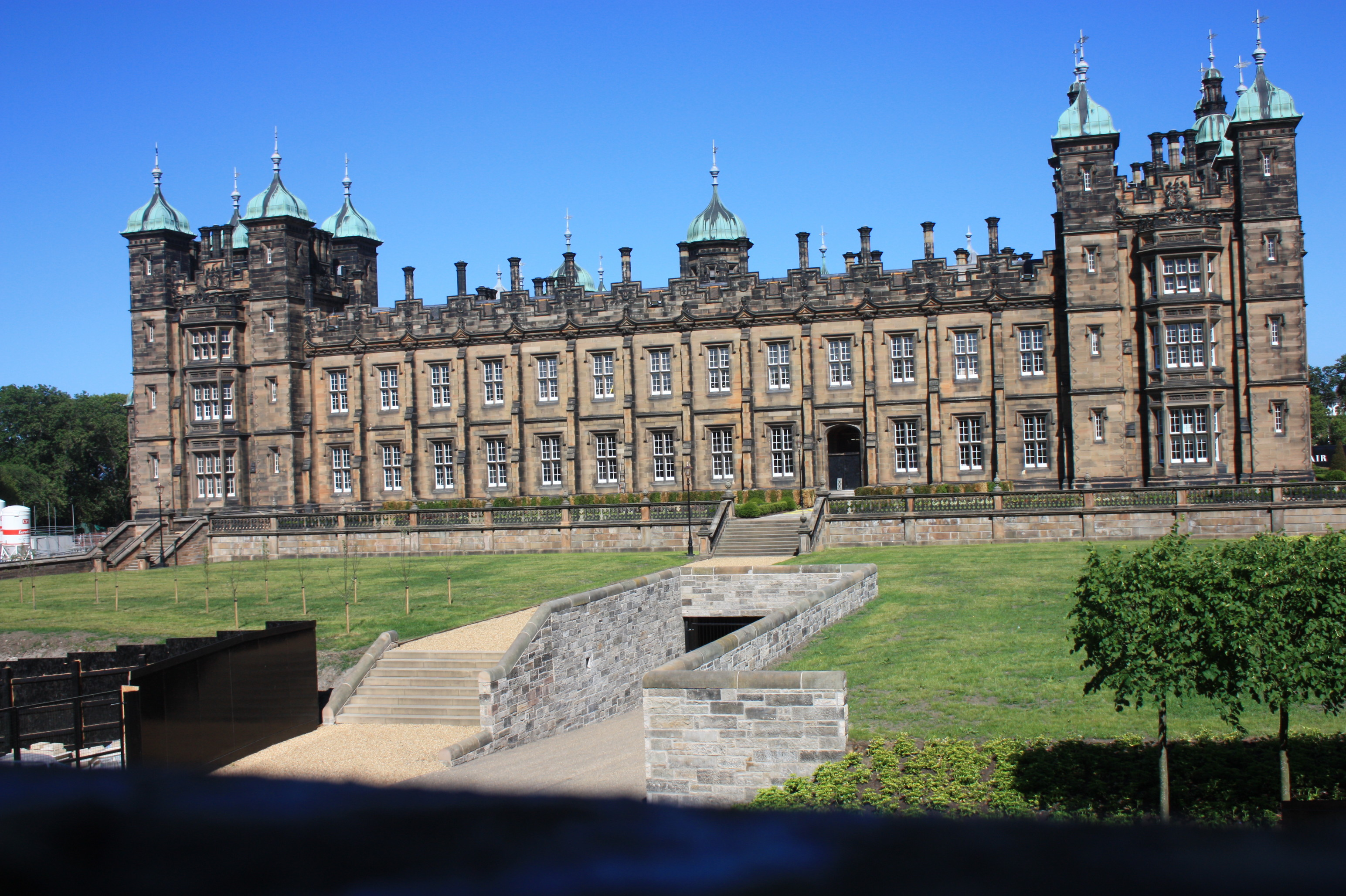
The west elevation of the pre-2008 Donaldson's School

The 1851 A-listed Donaldson's Hospital building in Edinburgh was designed by architect William Henry Playfair in the Jacobethan style. The building is built round a quadrangle in Tudor style with large corner towers which themselves are each made up of four smaller towers. Queen Victoria opened the building in 1850 and is reputed to have said that the building was more impressive than many of her own palaces.

After more than 150 years in the Playfair building, Donaldson's finally concluded that the building was no longer fit for purpose. Many of the rooms were no longer in use, classrooms were unable to use the latest educational technology and the trust could no longer afford to maintain the building. In 2003 the school's building was put up for sale and was purchased by Scottish property developer Cala Homes for £22 million, although the school continued to have use of the building until they moved out in 2008.

In 2015 City and Country, a property developer, submitted plans to develop the Donaldson's Hospital building and the East and West Gatehouses into luxury residential accommodation. Cala Homes also submitted a plan to build a new crescent of luxury residential accommodation at the rear of the building.

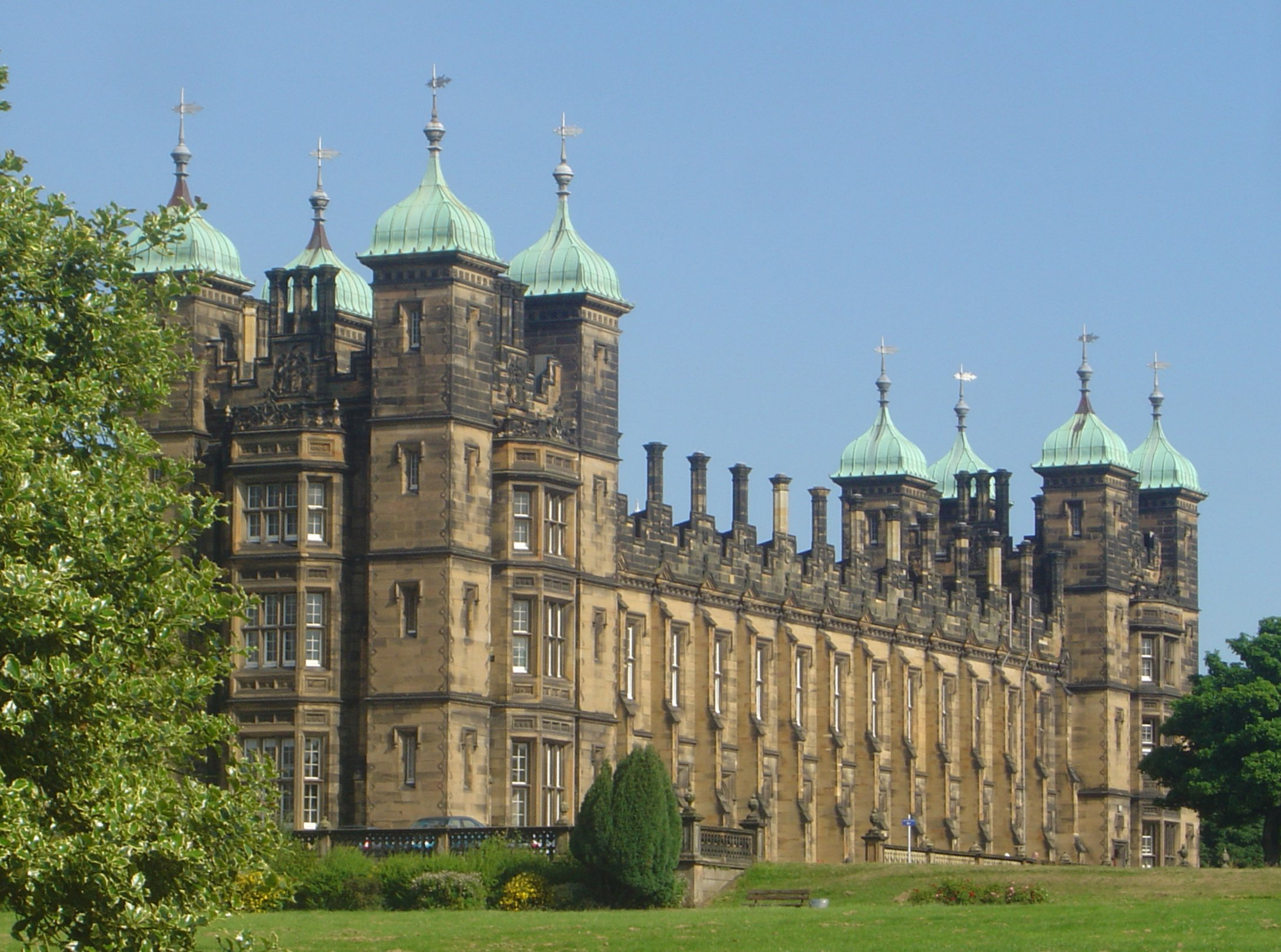
Donaldson's former home in West Coates, Edinburgh

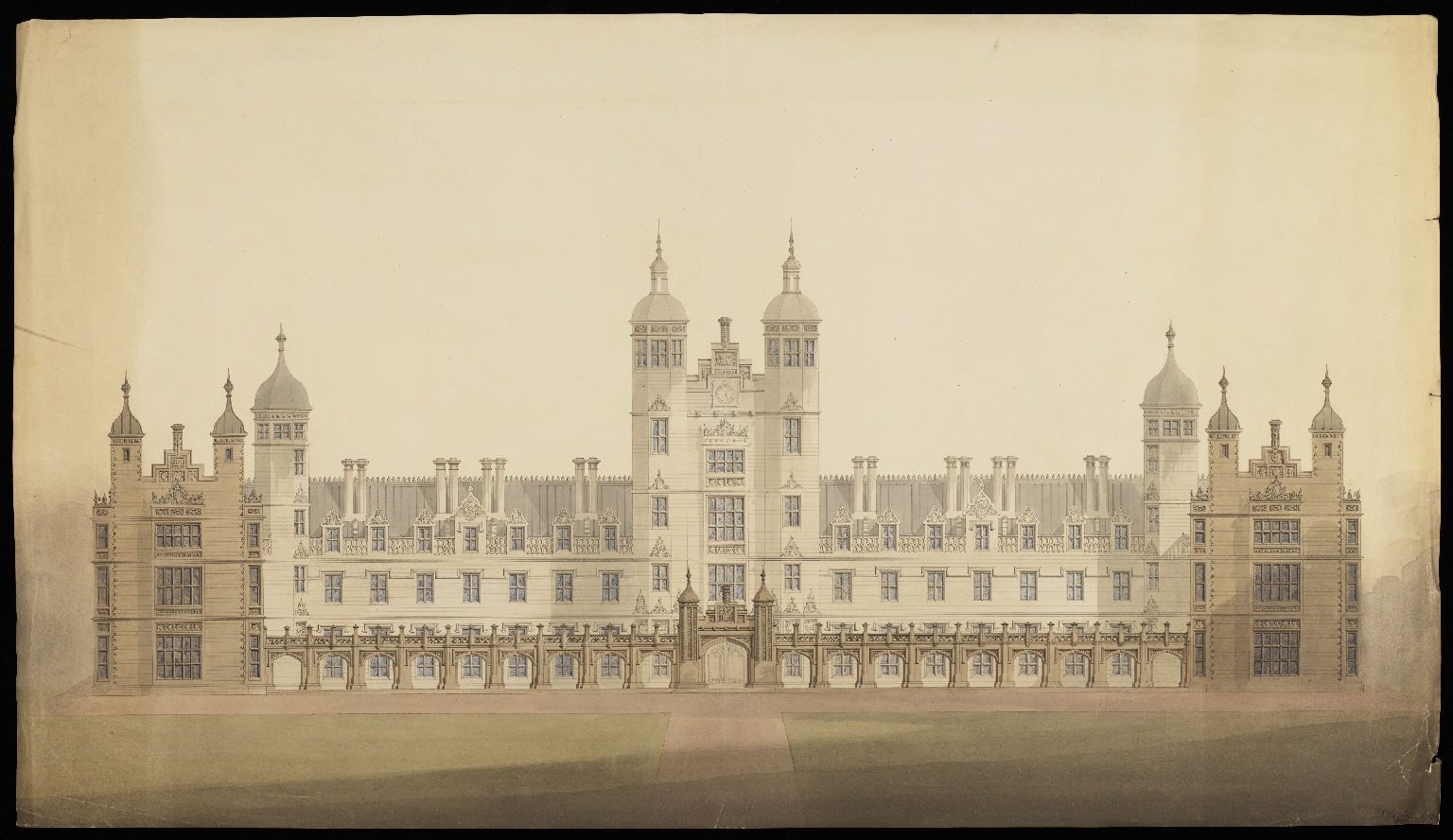
The University of Edinburgh Collections

=== Donaldson's School, Linlithgow, 2008 ===
A new, purpose-built Donaldson's campus opened at Preston Road (EH49 6HZ) in Linlithgow in January 2008. The new campus had facilities for up to 120 pupils. As a national Grant Aided Special School supported by the Scottish Government, the central location of the new site made the facilities more accessible to pupils from all over Scotland and the north of England.

The new Donaldson's School was developed in collaboration with staff, pupils, governors, acousticians and architects. It was built with a focus on energy efficiency and the environment. Shared teaching, sports and dining facilities formed a hub linking two teaching wings – the primary and secondary schools. Both schools were grouped around individual play spaces with links and views across the surrounding area. Facilities included a gym, swimming pool, fitness room, dining room, library, and assembly hall as well as an art studio. Classrooms, each of which accommodated six pupils, feature soundfield systems and interactive whiteboards. Donaldson's Lodge (residential accommodation) had 24 rooms placed in a separate building at the edge of the site in Linlithgow.
