= Donaldson v Becket =

1774 British ruling about copyright

Donaldson v Becket (1774) 2 Brown's Parl. Cases (2d ed.) 129, 1 Eng. Rep. 837; 4 Burr. 2408, 98 Eng. Rep. 257; 17 Cobbett's Parl. Hist. 953 is the ruling by the British House of Lords that held that copyright in published works was not perpetual but was subject to statutory limits. Some scholars disagree on the reasoning behind the decision.

== Name ==
The spelling of the chief respondent in the case, Thomas Becket, sometimes appears as Beckett. For those looking to choose one spelling over the other, it would be more correct to use Becket. Firstly, Becket overwhelmingly spelled his surname t, not tt. Secondly, many of the original contemporaneous records in the case also spelled his surname Becket. Those records include the original proceedings of the dispute in the Court of Chancery. Additionally, the manuscript records of the appeal in the House of Lords, including the manuscript minutes and manuscript journal of the House of Lords, caption the case using the spelling Becket, but sometimes in the text of the proceedings used the spelling Beckett. The earliest reports of the case, those prepared by James Burrow in 1776 and Josiah Brown (1st edition) in 1783, also spelled his surname Becket. The "Beckett" variation seems to have gained ground from a decision made in 1803 by T. E. Tomlins, the editor of the second edition of Brown's report of the case, to change the spelling to Beckett in the caption and then to a decision made by the clerk of the journals in the House of Lords, when the House printed its manuscript journal in around 1806, to do the same.

== Facts ==
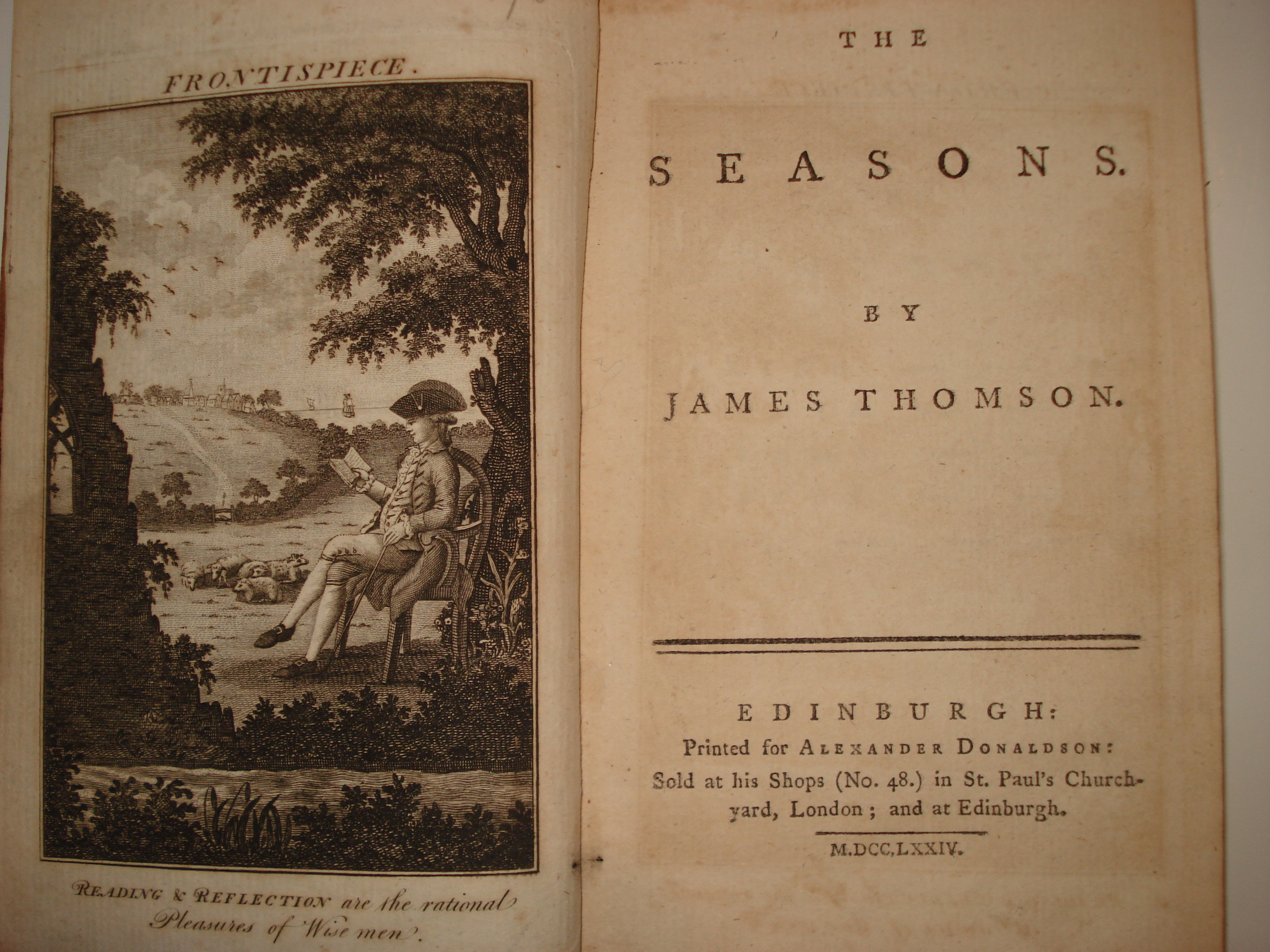
Photograph of Frontispiece – The Seasons by James Thomson Published by Alexander Donaldson

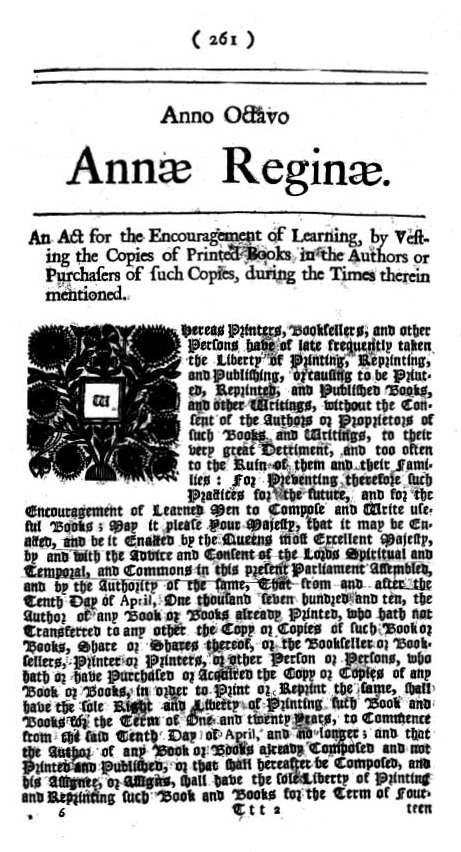
Statute of Anne

The first recognizably modern copyright statute was the Statute of Anne (8 Ann. c. 21) (1710), in which Parliament granted a fourteen-year term for a copyright, extendable once for another 14 years if the author was still alive at the expiration of the first term. Parliament also provided a special grandfather clause allowing those works already published before the statute to enjoy twenty-one years of protection. When the twenty-one years were up, the booksellers—for copyrights in published works were usually held and exploited by publishers and booksellers—asked for an extension. Parliament declined to grant it.

Thwarted by Parliament, the booksellers turned to the courts for relief. They attempted to secure a ruling that there was a natural or customary right to ownership of the copyright under the common law. The booksellers arranged a collusive lawsuit, Tonson v Collins, but the courts threw it out. A second lawsuit was later brought, Millar v Taylor 4 Burr. 2303, 98 Eng. Rep. 201 (K.B. 1769), concerning infringement of the copyright on James Thomson's poem "The Seasons" by Robert Taylor, and the booksellers won a favourable 3-1 judgment. (Lord Mansfield, the chief judge on the case, had previously been counsel to the copyright-holding booksellers in various suits filed in the Court of Chancery in the 1730s. Justice Yates, the dissenting judge in Millar v. Taylor, had himself previously been counsel to the challengers of common-law copyright in Tonson v. Collins.)

Donaldson v Becket was brought regarding the same poem at issue in Millar and an injunction was granted by the Court of Chancery on the precedent of Millar v. Taylor. An appeal from the Chancery decree was carried to the House of Lords, which at that time functioned as the United Kingdom's court of final appeal, in February 1774.

== Proceedings ==
=== Argument ===
Counsel was heard on 4, 7–9 February.

Seven months previously, in the case of Hinton v Donaldson, the Scots Court of Session had ruled that copyright did not exist in the common law of Scotland, so that Alexander Donaldson (an appellant in Donaldson v. Becket with his elder brother, John) could lawfully publish Thomas Stackhouse's New History of the Holy Bible. Attorney General Thurlow, speaking for the appellants, referred to the Scottish case in his opening argument to the Lords on 4 February:

[Attorney-General Thurlow] concluded his speech with a compliment to his learned coadjutor, and a hope, that as the lords of session in Scotland had freed that country from a monopoly which took its rise from the chimerical idea of the actuality of literary property, their lordships, whom he addressed, would likewise, by a decree of a similar nature, rescue the cause of literature and authorship from the hands of a few monopolizing booksellers.

=== Questions ===
The practice of the House of Lords at the time when considering a challenging case was to ask the twelve judges of the King's Bench, Common Pleas, and the Exchequer for their expert views on particular issues identified, for the consideration of the House. This would then be followed by a debate, and then a vote of the full house.

On 9 February, Lord Apsley, the Lord High Chancellor of Great Britain, formulated three questions for the judges:

1. "Whether, at common law, an author of any book or literary composition, had the sole right of first printing and publishing the same for sale, and might bring an action against any person who printed, published, and sold the same, without his consent?"
2. "If the author had such right originally, did the law take it away upon his printing and publishing such book or literary composition, and might any person afterward reprint and sell, for his own benefit, such book or literary composition, against the will of the author?
3. "If such action would have lain at common law, is it taken away by the statute of 8th Anne: and is an author, by the said statute, precluded from every remedy except on the foundation of the said statute, and on the terms and conditions prescribed thereby?"

At the instigation of Lord Camden, two further questions were also put:

4. "Whether the author of any literary composition, and his assigns, had the sole right of printing and publishing the same, in perpetuity, by the common law?"
5. "Whether this right is any way impeached, restrained, or taken away, by the statute 8th Anne?"

While the first questions were couched in terms of the rights of the authors, Lord Camden's emphasised the other side of the coin, the issue of a perpetual monopoly.

=== Answers ===
The judges presented their views in the period from 15 to 21 February.

According to the journal of the House of Lords, the balance of their opinions were:

- Eight answers to three, supporting authors' right of first publication at common law and right of action against publication without consent
- Seven answers to four, against the authors' rights at common law being taken away by first publication
- Six answers to five, supporting that authors' rights at common law in published works were superseded by the statute
- Seven answers to four, supporting that, at common law, authors had sole right of publication, in perpetuity
- Six answers to five, supporting that this right was circumscribed by the statute

For a time in the late 20th century, some scholars believed that the tally in the journal for the crucial third question was incorrect, and that a majority of the judges had opined that a common-law copyright was not "taken away" by the statute; but that their views had been rejected by the full House of Lords. However those scholars now appear to acknowledge, in light of a review of a wider range of documents, that the journal reported the positions of the judges correctly, as did law reports based on it; and that it was the reporting of the view of Justice George Nares in various works based ultimately on an account by William Woodfall in The Morning Chronicle that was incorrect.

The balance of opinions on the first question has sometimes traditionally been represented as ten-to-one; however according to the tallies while both Barons Perrott and Adams accepted that an author should have the sole right of printing or publishing a book or literary composition, they rejected the second half of the proposition, advising that an author should only be able to bring an action against someone who printed, published or sold it if they had obtained the copy by fraud or violence. A report in Hansard of Perrott's detailed reasons he makes clear that in his view the author's right at common law extended only to the physical copy, not to the content within it. Furthermore, while the Lord Chief Justice Lord de Grey answered the first question affirmatively, his detailed answer made clear that his position on this related only to the physical manuscript; his views on rights to "more than the materials or the manuscript" were the province of the second question (in which he opined that author's right at common law was indeed extinguished by first publication). Arguably a true statement of the judges' positions on whether authors had a natural copyright at common law would therefore be seven to four.

A twelfth judge who was entitled to state and give reasons for his answers was Lord Mansfield. Presumably his views still conformed to his original judgment, in Millar v Taylor. But – to the frustration of some – he did not speak.

=== Debate and vote ===
On 22 February the motion was made to reverse the Chancery decree. The Lords then debated, the record showing that five Lords spoke. Four of these, Lord Camden, Lord Chancellor Apsley, the Bishop of Carlisle, and the Earl of Effingham, spoke in favour of the motion to reverse the decree, and one, Lord Lyttleton, spoke against the motion.

Lord Camden, in his speech, was scathing toward the booksellers:

The arguments attempted to be maintained on the side of the respondents, were founded on patents, privileges, Star Chamber decrees, and the bye (sic) laws of the Stationers' Company; all of them the effects of the grossest tyranny and usurpation; the very last places in which I should have dreamt of finding the least trace of the common law of this kingdom; and yet, by a variety of subtle reasoning and metaphysical refinements, have they endeavoured to squeeze out the spirit of the common law from premises in which it could not possibly have existence.

In the end, the full House voted to reverse the decree against Donaldson. Thus the House of Lords rejected perpetual copyright in published works and held that they were subject to the durational limits of the Statute of Anne. As a result, published works would fall into the public domain after their copyright terms expired.

It had been thought, for many years, that the House of Lords voted by division. But research has demonstrated that the vote in the case was taken by a collective voice vote, and thus without knowing how many Lords voted, their names, or how they each voted.

== Significance ==
Robert Forbes, Bishop of Ross and Caithness, noted in his journal entry of 26 February 1774, that when news of the Lords' decision in Donaldson v. Becket reached Scotland, there were

great rejoicings in Edinburgh upon victory over literary property; bonfires and illuminations, ordered tho' by a mob, with drum and 2 fifes.

Later that year, UK booksellers sought to extend their statutory copyright to 14 years through the Booksellers' Bill but, having passed the House of Commons, the bill was defeated in the Lords. In 1834, the United States Supreme Court also rejected perpetual copyright in Wheaton v. Peters.

=== Common-law copyright ===
The significance of the decision for the doctrine of common-law copyright was (and is) less clear.

As a matter of strict judicial precedent, the court had merely established that once a work was published it was governed solely by the durational terms of the Statute of Anne. This was how the holding was stated by Justice Blackstone, one of the judges whose view had been in favour of perpetual copyright, in his Commentaries on the Laws of England (7th edition, 1775). It is also the general view of scholars of the case today. This notably was also the view of the case taken by the judges and Law Lords who spoke on the issue in Jefferys v. Boosey, 4 H.L.C. 815, 872, 961 (H.L. 1854). Referring to Donaldson, Lord Brougham stated that "upon the general question of literary property at common law no judgment whatever was pronounced."

Nevertheless, it became common for observers in the late eighteenth century and beyond to read Donaldson, sometimes in combination with Millar, as persuasive authority predominating in favor of an antecedent common-law right in literary works, both before and after first publication. This viewpoint probably stemmed from the fact that a majority of the judges who had advised the House on the issue—and even a majority of the judges and speaking Lords combined who had advised the House and who spoke on the antecedent right—opined or allowed that an antecedent right did exist.

In recent times, two scholars have argued that the House affirmatively rejected the notion that a common law copyright existed before the Statute of Anne, though it appears that only one of them continues to advocate this view. Scholars have criticized the sole holdout—who conceded in his principal article on the subject to being "unfamiliar[] with the nuances of 18th century English parliamentary procedure"—for relying on anachronistic arguments.

== See also ==
- Copyright law of the United Kingdom
- History of copyright law
- List of leading legal cases in copyright law
- Wheaton v. Peters, U.S. Supreme Court case also addressing the existence of copyright at common law
