= Iron Mountain (company) =

American information management company

Iron Mountain Incorporated
- Type: Public
- Traded as: NYSE: IRM; S&P 500 component
- Industry: Information storage Enterprise information management
- Founded: 1951; 75 years ago
- Headquarters: Boston, Massachusetts, United States
- Number of locations: 1,350 (2024)
- Key people: William Meaney, CEO
- Revenue: ▲US$6.15 billion (2024)
- Operating income: ▲US$1.01 billion (2024)
- Net income: ▼US$180 million (2024)
- Total assets: ▲US$18.7 billion (2024)
- Total equity: ▼US$−503 million (2024)
- Number of employees: 11,150 (2024)
- Website: ironmountain.com

Iron Mountain Inc. is a global enterprise information management services company founded in 1951 and headquartered in Boston, Massachusetts. Its records management, information destruction, and data backup and recovery services are supplied to more than 220,000 customers in 58 countries throughout North America, Europe, Latin America, Africa, Asia, and Oceania.

Iron Mountain is a component of the S&P 500 Index and a member of the FTSE4Good ethical investment stock market index.

== History ==
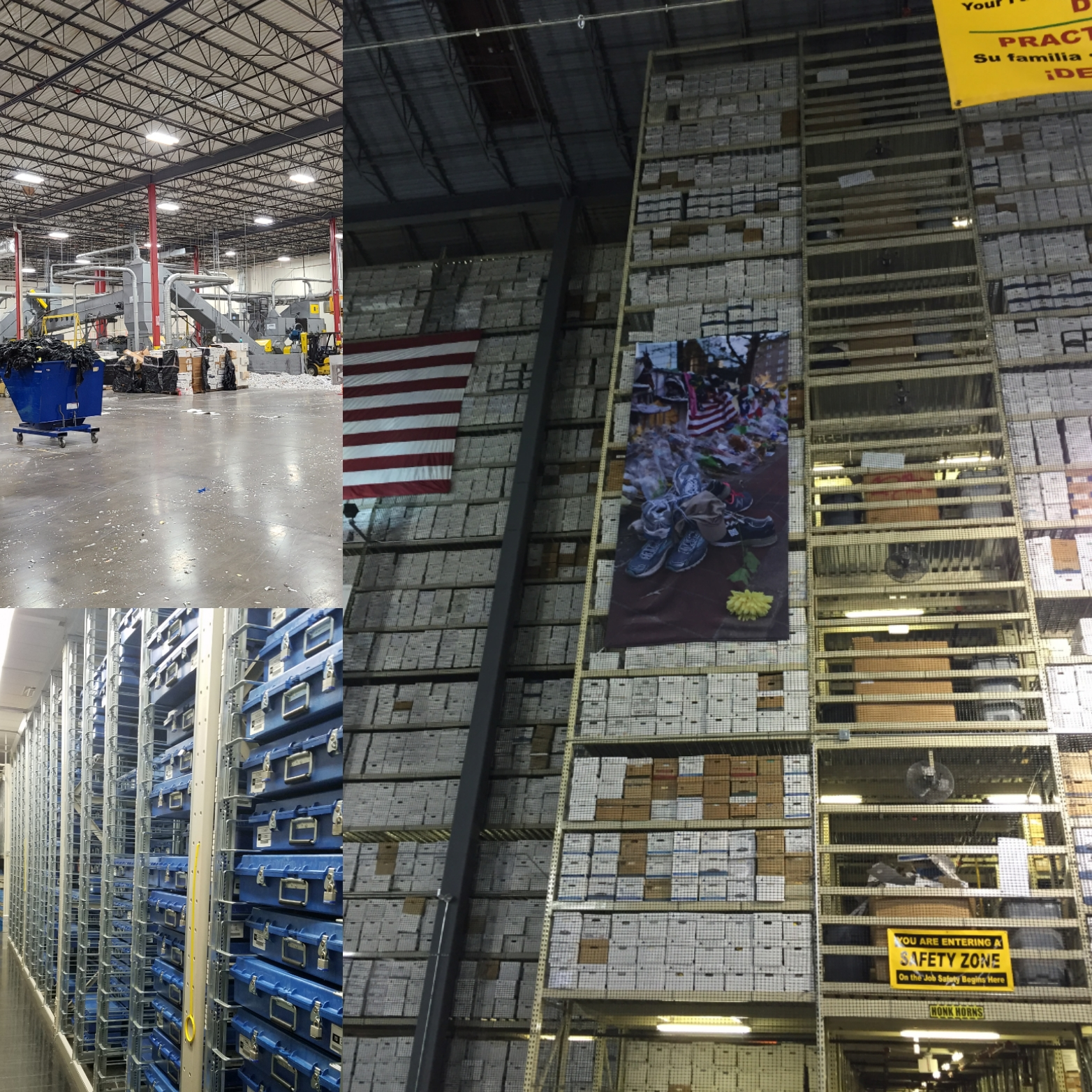
IMRM Records Center-Shred Plant- DM Vault

=== Founding and early years (1951–1970) ===
The company was started by Herman Knaust, who had made his fortune growing and marketing mushrooms. He purchased a depleted iron ore mine and 100 acres (0.40 km^{2}) of land in Kingston, New York, for $9,000 in 1936. By 1950, the mushroom market had shifted, and Knaust was looking for alternative uses for his mine, which he had named "Iron Mountain." Knaust saw a business opportunity amidst widespread Cold War fears to protect corporate information from nuclear attack and other disasters.

The company was originally founded in 1951 as Iron Mountain Atomic Storage Corporation; it opened its first underground "vaults" in 1951 and its first sales office in the Empire State Building, about 125 miles (201 km) south. Iron Mountain's first customer was East River Savings Bank, which brought microfilm copies of deposit records and duplicate signature cards in armored cars for storage in the mountain facility.

=== Middle years (1970–2000) ===
This first iteration of Iron Mountain was bankrupt by the early 1970s and was wholly acquired by Vincent J. Ryan through his holdings in Schooner Capital Corporation, Boston, Massachusetts. At the time, it consisted of the original facility in Livingston, New York and IMAR (Iron Mountain at Rosendale), a former limestone mine and mushroom cave outside of Kingston, New York.

In 1978, the company opened its first above-ground records-storage facility. In 1980, it expanded to Rhode Island through the purchase of a former Industrial National Bank (a precursor to FleetBoston) cold site and data tape repository in Glocester, Rhode Island. It had many Fortune 500 clients at the time, and its revenue was in the $6 million range in the early 1980s.

In the mid-1980s, it convinced Manufacturers Hanover Bank to move all its paper records out of Manhattan to an above-ground facility, a former strip mall in Port Ewen, New York. This was the first time a records management company used barcodes to enable real-time access to shipped boxes and the documents inside.

During the 1980s, the company expanded beyond New York, opening facilities throughout New York and New England, and in 1988, extended its reach into 12 more U.S. markets by acquiring Bell & Howell Records Management, Inc. The firm went public on January 31, 1996. In 1997, Iron Mountain became a leading software escrow company with the acquisition of Data Securities International (DSI). In 1998, Iron Mountain made its first overseas acquisition by buying British Data Management, Ltd. The company reported a $423 million revenues by the end of the same fiscal year of its acquisition.

=== Expansion and consolidation (2000–present) ===
In February 2000, Iron Mountain Incorporated announced the completion of its acquisition of Pierce Leahy Corp. (NYSE:PLH) in a stock-for-stock merger valued at approximately $1.1 billion. In 2004, Iron Mountain formed a digital assets division called "Iron Mountain Digital", following the acquisition of Connected Corporation, a maker of online PC backup software. In 2005, Iron Mountain Digital bought LiveVault, a provider of online backup software for server data. In 2007 Iron Mountain acquired Stratify Inc., one of the larger e-discovery service providers at the production end of the Electronic Discovery Reference Model (EDRM). The acquired businesses of LiveVault and Stratify Inc. were consolidated into Iron Mountain Digital. In 1981, Richard Reese became the company's CEO. In 1995, he concurrently assumed the position of chairman. He remained as CEO until June 2008, when he was replaced by Bob Brennan, but he remained in the chairman's seat. In April 2011, the company announced Brennan's departure, and Reese resumed his former title.

In February 2010, Iron Mountain acquired California-based eDiscovery and content archiving software provider, Mimosa Systems. The acquisition, too, was absorbed into Iron Mountain Digital. In May 2011, Iron Mountain divested Iron Mountain Digital, which was acquired by the British enterprise search and knowledge management firm Autonomy Corporation for $380 million. In August 2011, Hewlett-Packard acquired the Cambridge-based Autonomy, and amalgamated the operations of Autonomy (which included Iron Mountain Digital) into HP's enterprise software division. In May 2012, Iron Mountain expanded its high-security storage facility business through the acquisition of three records storage firms—File House Offsite Record Storage in Fredericksburg, Virginia; and Document Systems Inc. in Columbia, South Carolina; and First National Safe Deposit in Philadelphia. In November 2013, Iron Mountain announced it would be shutting down its Saint John, New Brunswick, contact center in 2014.

As of January 1, 2014, Iron Mountain successfully converted to a real estate investment trust after approval of private letter ruling requests by the IRS to classify steel racking structures as qualified real estate assets.

At the end of April 2015, Iron Mountain announced it would acquire Australian data protection services provider Recall Holdings for around $2.2 billion in cash and stock. At the end of March 2016, the Australian Competition & Consumer Commission released a statement saying it would not block the acquisition of Recall pursuant to Iron Mountain's agreement to divest most of its Australian business. At the same time, the Canadian Competition Bureau announced it entered an agreement with Iron Mountain to allow the acquisition as long as Iron Mountain divested records management assets in the markets in which it found the acquisition would limit effective remaining competitors: Toronto, Montreal, Ottawa, Calgary, Edmonton and Vancouver.

The US Department of Justice agreed to allow the acquisition, provided that Iron Mountain divested records management assets in the 15 markets where Iron Mountain and Recall were two of the top three competitors. These markets include Detroit; Kansas City, Missouri; Charlotte, North Carolina; Durham, North Carolina; Raleigh, North Carolina; Buffalo, New York; Tulsa, Oklahoma; Pittsburgh; Greenville/Spartanburg, South Carolina; Nashville, Tennessee; San Antonio, Texas; Richmond, Virginia; San Diego; Atlanta; and Seattle.

The UK's Competition and Markets Authority approved the acquisition pending an investigation into the acquisition's effect on competition in the UK. In June 2016, the Competition and Markets Authority determined the acquisition would create a "substantial lessening of competition" in Aberdeen and Dundee. In response to this report, Iron Mountain and the Competition and Markets Authority reached an agreement whereby Iron Mountain would sell Recall's existing operations in Aberdeen and Dundee (known as C21 Data Services). On May 2, 2016, Iron Mountain announced the completion of the $2 billion (US) merger, mostly in stock.

In 2016, Fortune magazine listed Iron Mountain at number 729 on its list of the largest 1000 public companies in the United States. In September 2016, the unpublished recordings of musician Prince, consisting of over $200 million worth of recorded music and film, were moved to an Iron Mountain facility in Los Angeles, due to water damage and poor storage conditions in Prince's Paisley Park recording facility, in Chanhassen, Minnesota. In December 2017, the company purchased IO Data Centers' US division for $1.3 billion, which includes four colocation data centers in New Jersey, Ohio and two in Arizona. In February 2021, the company purchased Infofort, an information management solutions provider in the Middle East, North Africa and Turkey (MENAT) region. As of 2023, Iron Mountain's headquarters are located in Portsmouth, New Hampshire. In 2024, Iron Mountain acquired IT asset disposition (ITAD) services provider Regency Technologies for $200 million.

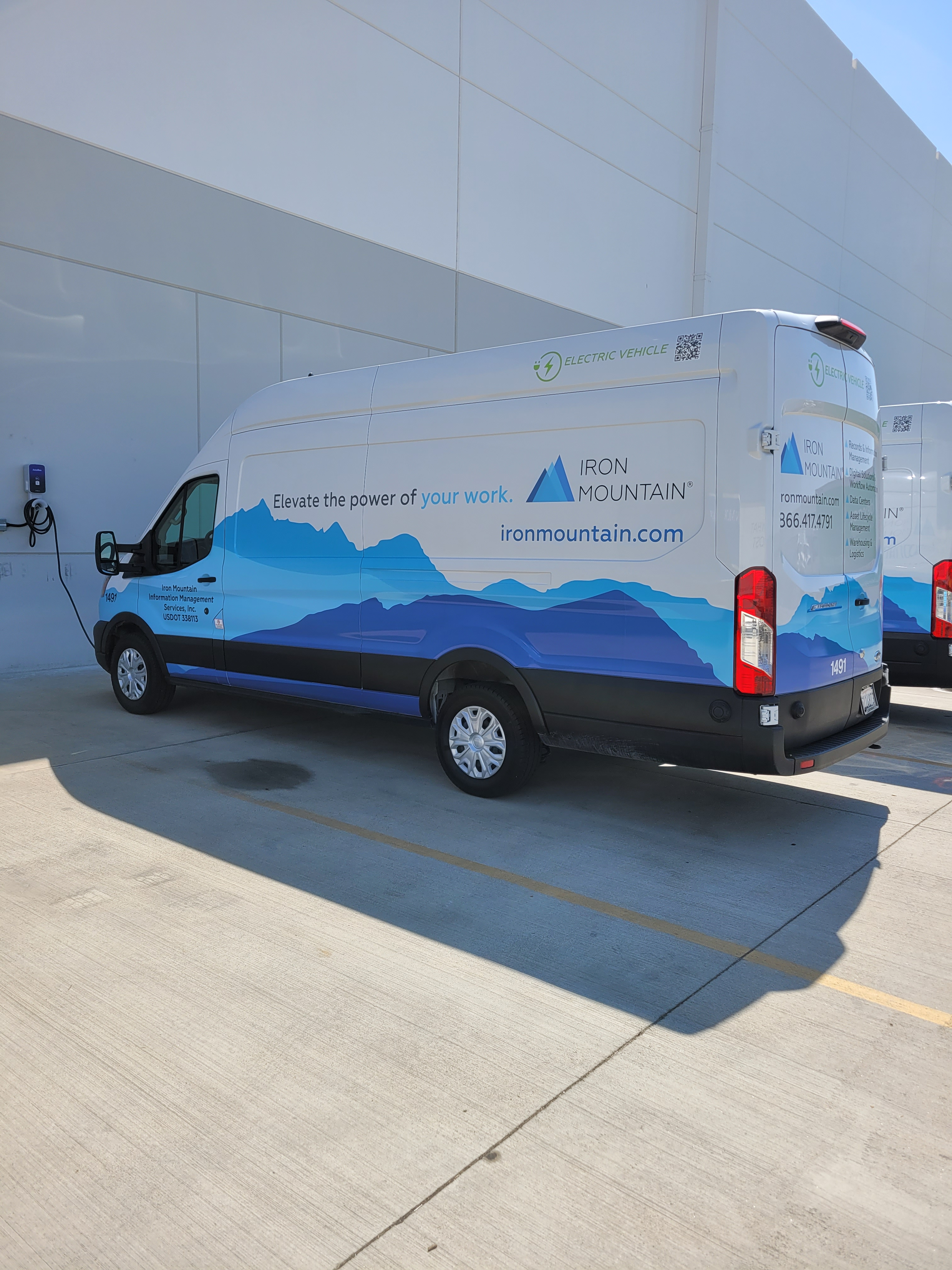
An Iron Mountain Electric Vehicle in 2023.

== Facilities and holdings ==
Iron Mountain has underground storage facilities in the United States and the rest of the world, but most of the company's over 1,500 storage locations are in above-ground leased warehouse space located near customers. Its storage location in Dighton, Massachusetts was once a missile storage battery during the Cold War.

The best-known Iron Mountain storage facility is a 1.7 million sq. ft. high-security storage facility in a former limestone quarry at Boyers, Pennsylvania, near the city of Butler in the United States (41.093°N 79.911°W). The facility features climate controlled storage areas protected by armed guards. It began storing records in 1954 and was purchased by Iron Mountain in 1998. It is here that Bill Gates stores his Corbis photographic collection in a refrigerated cave 220 feet (67 m) underground, as well as where Universal Music Group stores its United States masters.

Nearby, the U.S. Office of Personnel Management leases another cavern to store, and process government employee retirement papers. Appearing at an event in the Oval Office alongside President Donald Trump in February 2025, Elon Musk criticized the OPM's use of this facility. In a Special Report episode Musk and his team ridiculed "the mine," insinuating it was the bottleneck limiting the number of retirement applications that could be processed. The factual accuracy of some aspects of Musk's account have been disputed by journalists and former government employees, although the Government Accountability Office noted problems with the OPM's handling of paperwork in 2019.

The company stores the wills of Princess Diana, Charles Dickens, and Charles Darwin. It also houses the original recordings of Frank Sinatra, as well as master recordings from Sony Music Entertainment (over a million recordings; reportedly in Rosendale, New York), Universal Music Group (in Butler), and Warner Music Group (in southern California). In order to protect the masters, Iron Mountain equips some of its music-holding facilities with professional studios so the masters never have to leave the premises. Over 1,800 cans of unclaimed nitrate film formerly held by Iron Mountain now make up the Iron Mountain Collection at the Academy Film Archive.

== Recognition ==
Security Magazine named Iron Mountain in "Security 500" of 2008, an annual ranking of the United States' 500 most secure companies. Iron Mountain was its industry's sole representative in the category of business services. Published in the magazine's November issue, the Security 500 ranks companies using several metrics such as the percentage of a company's revenue spent on security. The survey tracks 16 vertical markets to serve as a benchmarking tool for companies.

Fortune magazine has had Iron Mountain on its list of the "World's Most Admired Companies" every year from 2006 to 2011. In its category, "diversified outsourcing services", it has every year come in second behind Aramark. The only exception was 2006, when it also ranked below Convergys.

In April 2009, Iron Mountain's Digital Record Center for Images was recognized as a "Product of the Year" by the Massachusetts Network Communications Council in the "Cloud Computing, Virtualization and Data Warehousing/Storage category".

== Data losses ==
The company has received media attention for losing or misplacing customer files and data, particularly tapes containing private information such as home addresses and Social Security numbers.

- In 1997, a fire destroyed a warehouse just off the New Jersey Turnpike (USA) at Exit 8, full of corporate documents. This was two days after a smaller blaze damaged another warehouse several hundred feet away. Both buildings are owned by Iron Mountain Inc.
- In May 2005, Time Warner disclosed that a container of 40 unencrypted backup tapes containing the personal information of 600,000 current and former employees had disappeared while being transported in an Iron Mountain van that made 18 other stops in Manhattan that day. After the loss, Time Warner began encrypting its tapes, and Iron Mountain advised its other clients to do the same.
- In April 2006, tapes containing personal information for about 17,000 Long Island Rail Road employees were lost while in transit to the railroad's office, along with tapes belonging to the U.S. Department of Veterans Affairs being shipped in the same vehicle.
- In July 2006, a fire completely destroyed a leased six-story company warehouse in London. The paper records of 600 customers, including client files stored by several prominent London law firms, were lost. Also destroyed were the medical records of up to 240,000 patients of Chelsea and Westminster Hospital. The London Fire Brigade later concluded that the fire was caused by arson.
- Also in July 2006, a small fire believed to have been caused by contractors making roof repairs damaged a company warehouse in Ottawa, Ontario, Canada.
- In August 2007, the company began retrofitting its unmarked vans and trucks with a new security and alarm system using chain of custody technology to reduce the exposure of customer data to possible loss. Among other security features, the system uses radio frequency authentication and real-time tracking capabilities to help prevent "mysterious disappearances" of tapes, or their actual removal from the vehicle, during transit.
- On November 4, 2011, a large fire struck Iron Mountain's document storage warehouse and headquarters in Aprilia, Italy. According to news reports, the entire building was enveloped in flames causing substantial damage to the building and, presumably, to the documents and digital content stored there. Approximately 40 employees worked in the facility but nobody was injured.
- On February 5, 2014, an intentional fire completely burned down the company's Buenos Aires warehouse. At least nine firefighters died in the incident, while seven others were severely injured.
- In August 2024, Iron Mountain acknowledged that 20% of the thousands of hard disks from the 1990s, which it stored offline for customers, were unrecoverable.
- On November 15, 2025 an Iron Mountain facility located on Ezeiza, Buenos Aires was destroyed by the explosion of a nearby paint factory that caught ablaze.

== Other controversies ==
St. Louis public television station KETC sued Iron Mountain in 2026 for access to 70 years worth of archived footage that the station owns but is housed in an Iron Mountain data center in the Denver area. Iron Mountain claims a third party that went out of the business owned the system hosting KETC’s data. A district judge in Denver issued a preliminary injunction prohibiting Iron Mountain from altering the material in any way.
