= Perpetual copyright =

Copyright that lasts indefinitely

Perpetual copyright, also known as indefinite copyright, is copyright that lasts indefinitely. Perpetual copyright arises either when a copyright has no finite term from outset, or when a copyright's original finite term is perpetually extended. The first of these two scenarios is highly uncommon, as the current laws of all countries with copyright statutes set a standard limit on the duration, based either on the date of creation/publication, or on the date of the creator's death. Exceptions have sometimes been made, however, for unpublished works. Usually, special legislation is required, granting a perpetual copyright to a specific work.

In many countries, moral rights, which may be covered under the copyright law, can last perpetually.

== Copyright philosophy ==
The basic philosophical argument employed by proponents of perpetual copyright presupposes that intellectual property ownership rights are analogous to other property rights such as those associated with material goods. Proponents such as Mark Twain and Jack Valenti have stated that owners of intellectual property should have the same perpetual right to retain and bequeath this property to their descendants that owners of material goods already possess. Jonathan Zittrain, a faculty co-director at the Berkman Center for Internet & Society, illustrated this argument using the analogy: "[It] makes no sense to imagine somebody after a certain time coming in and taking your rug or your chair and saying 'Sorry, your ownership expired.'"

In an op-ed published in The New York Times, author Mark Helprin argues that it is unjust for a government to strip copyright holders of their exclusive rights after a set period of time. He also writes that copyright expiration transfers wealth from private copyright holders to corporations:

"'Freeing' a literary work into the public domain is less a public benefit than a transfer of wealth from the families of American writers to the executives and stockholders of various businesses who will continue to profit from, for example, The Garden Party, while the descendants of Katherine Mansfield will not."

Calls for perpetual copyright have been widely criticized. Lawrence Lessig organized a community response to Helprin's editorial. Public Knowledge issued a response which argued that copyright expiration ultimately provides a net benefit to society. It distinguishes intellectual property rights from those associated with material goods; the latter "are scarce and rivalrous: [they] cannot be created anew, and only a limited number of people can occupy and use a space at any one time. Copyrighted works are neither scarce nor rivalrous: books are created anew, by specific authors, and can be read by five million people as easily as by five dozen, depriving none of them, nor the author, of the ability to use the work." Critics state that copyright expiration does not deprive a creator's heirs of the right to continue to appreciate and use the works of that creator as though a government had legally confiscated their physical possessions after a set period of time. Society as a whole is granted the same right to appreciate and exploit the property that once was under the exclusive control of a single family or corporate entity. This wider potential for the creative exploitation of works formerly under the exclusive control of a copyright owner promotes learning. Public Knowledge and other critics wrote that existing copyright terms already provide more than sufficient compensation for creators of intellectual property. It has also been argued that copyright should not become a welfare system used to benefit remote descendants who happen to come into possession of a valuable copyright through the lottery of birth, and that society is a "quite important heir" to copyrighted works.

Critics of perpetual copyright also point out that creative activity often involves the creation of derivative works that recast or build upon previous material. If this prior material were perpetually copyrighted, their respective copyright holders would have the indefinite right to license their intellectual property or deny its use as they see fit. Many new derivative works could not be produced if the interested parties were denied permission or could not afford the licensing fees. Moreover, the longer copyright persists, the more copyrighted material falls into the category of orphan works. Anyone seeking to create derivative works based upon orphan works faces the risk of copyright infringement if the copyright holders were to come forward at some later time to enforce their rights. Perpetual copyright would create a significant disincentive to the creation of new literary or artistic works which build upon older material.

== Battle of the booksellers ==
When the statutory copyright terms provided for by the Statute of Anne (1710), the first copyright statute, began to expire in 1731, London booksellers fought to defend their dominant position by seeking injunctions from the Court of Chancery for works by authors that fell outside the statute's protection. At the same time the London booksellers lobbied parliament to extend the copyright term provided by the Statute of Anne. Eventually, in a case known as Midwinter v Hamilton (1743–1748), the London booksellers turned to common law and started a 30-year period known as the battle of the booksellers. The battle of the booksellers saw London booksellers locking horns with the newly emerging Scottish book trade over the right to reprint works falling outside the protection of the Statute of Anne. The Scottish booksellers argued that no common law copyright existed in an author's work. The London booksellers argued that the Statute of Anne only supplemented and supported a pre-existing common law copyright. The dispute was argued out in a number of notable cases, including Millar v. Kincaid (1749–1751) and Tonson v. Collins (1761–1762). A debate raged on whether printed ideas could be owned and London booksellers and other supporters of perpetual copyright argued that without it scholarship would cease to exist and that authors would have no incentive to continue creating works of enduring value if they could not bequeath the property rights to their descendants. Opponents of perpetual copyright argued that it amounted to a monopoly, which inflated the price of books, making them less affordable and therefore prevented the spread of the Enlightenment. London booksellers were attacked for using rights of authors to mask their greed and self-interest in controlling the book trade.

When Donaldson v Beckett reached the House of Lords in 1774 Lord Camden was most strident in his rejection of the common law copyright, warning the Lords that should they vote in favour of common law copyright, effectively a perpetual copyright, "all our learning will be locked up in the hands of the Tonsons and the Lintots of the age". Moreover, he warned that booksellers would then set upon books whatever price they pleased "till the public became as much their slaves, as their own hackney compilers are". He declared that "Knowledge and science are not things to be bound in such cobweb chains." In its ruling the House of Lords established that copyright was a "creature of statute", and that the rights and responsibilities in copyright were determined by legislation. By confirming that the copyright term (that is the length of time a work is in copyright) did expire according to statute, the Lords also affirmed the public domain. The Donaldson v Beckett ruling confirmed that a large number of works and books first published in Britain were in the public domain, either because the copyright term granted by statute had expired, or because they were first published before the Statute of Anne was enacted in 1709. This opened the market for cheap reprints of works from William Shakespeare, John Milton and Geoffrey Chaucer, works now considered classics. The expansion of the public domain in books broke the dominance of the London booksellers and allowed for competition, with the number of London booksellers and publishers rising threefold from 111 to 308 between 1772 and 1802. Nevertheless, calls for perpetual copyright continued in Britain and France until the mid-19th century.

=== Common law copyright ===
After Donaldson v Beckett, disagreement continued over whether the House of Lords affirmed the existence of common law copyright before it was superseded by the Statute of Anne. The Lords had traditionally been hostile to the booksellers' monopoly and were aware of how the doctrine of common law copyright, promoted by the booksellers, was used to support their case for a perpetual copyright. The Lords clearly voted against perpetual copyright, and eventually an understanding was established whereby authors had a pre-existing common law copyright over their work, but that with the Statute of Anne parliament had limited these natural rights in order to strike a more appropriate balance between the interests of the author and the wider social good. According to Patterson and Livingston there remains confusion about the nature of copyright ever since. Copyright has come to be viewed both as a natural law right of the author and as the statutory grant of a limited monopoly. One theory holds that copyright's origin occurs at the creation of a work, the other that its origin exists only through the copyright statute. In 1834, the US Supreme Court ruled in Wheaton v. Peters, a case similar to the British Donaldson v Beckett of 1774, that although the author of an unpublished work had a common law right to control the first publication of that work, the author did not have a common law right to control reproduction following the first publication of the work.

== Situation by country ==
=== Cuba ===
According to Article 46 of Law No. 14 of 28 December 1977 (Ley de Derecho de Autor, lit. 'Law on Copyright'), as amended up to 1994, governmental works were under perpetual copyright. The 1977 law was repealed by the Law No. 154 on the Rights of Authors and Performing Artists, of 5 December 2022, which has no perpetual copyright provisions, and Cuban government works now enter the public domain 50 years after being published.

=== Denmark ===
According to two royal decrees from 1816 and 1831, as reaffirmed by Section 92 of Consolidate Act No. 1144 of 22 December 2014 on Copyright, maps produced by the Royal Danish Nautical Charts Archive and the General Staff Topographic Department respectively are under indefinite copyright: at the time of the decrees, the fine for each infringing copy was ten silver rigsbankdaler (20 kroner).

=== Republic of Ireland ===
According to Section 200 of the Copyright and Related Rights Act, 2000, the designs of banknotes and coins of the Irish pound (and not the euro) are under perpetual copyright.

=== Portugal ===
Portugal recognised copyright as perpetual from 1851 to 1867 and from 1927 to 1966.

=== Singapore ===
Pursuant to Section 197 of the Copyright Act, unpublished governmental literary, dramatic and musical works are under perpetual copyright, but once published, they are copyrighted for 70 years following publication.

=== Soviet Union ===
In the former Soviet Union, under the 1961 Fundamentals, copyrights held by legal entities such as companies were defined to be perpetual; if a company was reorganized, its legal successor entity took over the copyrights, and if a company ceased to exist, the copyrights passed to the state.

=== Turkey ===
According to Article 26 of the Law no. 5846 of Intellectual and Artistic Works, any unpublished works are protected in perpetuity until their publication. Article 19 clarifies that the Ministry of Culture and Tourism can exercise rights in the case of expired copyright or orphan work, if the work is deemed to be of national cultural importance.

=== United Kingdom ===
The Copyright Act 1775 established a type of perpetual copyright which allowed "the Two Universities in England, the Four Universities in Scotland, and the several colleges of Eton, Westminster, and Winchester to hold in Perpetuity their Copy Right in Books given to or bequeathed to the said Universities and Colleges for the advancement of useful learning and other purposes of education." All provisions granting copyright in perpetuity were abolished by the Copyright, Designs and Patents Act 1988, but under transitional arrangements these rights do not fully expire until 2039. Separately, the Crown retains rights under the royal prerogative to control printing of the Authorised Version of the Bible, and of the Book of Common Prayer.

J. M. Barrie's 1904 play Peter Pan, although out of copyright, is covered by special legislation which grants Great Ormond Street Hospital a right to royalties in perpetuity. Specifically, the Copyright, Designs and Patents Act 1988 provides that the hospital's charity is entitled to a royalty "in respect of any public performance, commercial publication or communication to the public of the whole or any substantial part of [the play] or an adaptation of it." This law does not apply to earlier works which feature the Peter Pan character, such as The Little White Bird and Peter Pan in Kensington Gardens.

=== United States ===
In the United States, perpetual copyright is prohibited by its Constitution, which provides that copyright is "for limited times". It does not specify the length of the term, nor does it impose any restriction on the number of times the term may be extended. Since the enactment of the Copyright Act of 1790, copyright term has been extended by Congress on four occasions, retroactively extending the terms of any copyrights still in force. Following the enactment of the Copyright Term Extension Act in 1998, a coalition of plaintiffs led by publisher Eric Eldred argued that this act and a previous extension of the copyright term in the 1970s had created a de facto "perpetual copyright on the installment plan". This argument was rejected by the US Supreme Court in Eldred v. Ashcroft, which held that there was no limit to how many times the term of copyright may be extended by Congress, so long as it is still a limited term at the time of each extension.

State and common law had granted perpetual copyright in certain special cases not covered by federal copyright law. Sound recordings made before 1972 were under the jurisdiction of state copyright laws. which provided perpetual, common-law protection; these laws were pre-empted by the Hatch–Goodlatte Act. Prior to 1 January 1978, when the Copyright Act of 1976 came into effect, unpublished works were protected by common law, which recognized perpetual copyright in these works for as long as they remained unpublished. The 1976 Copyright Act exerted federal jurisdiction over unpublished works for the first time and all copyrights in these works were assigned a fixed term even if they remain unpublished.

In the case Golan v. Holder (2012), the Supreme Court ruled that Congress could release works from the public domain to submit them again to the protection of copyright, without violating the Constitution.

=== Uruguay ===
According to Article 40 of Law No. 9739 of 17 December 1937 (Ley de Derechos de Autor), governmental works are under perpetual copyright.

== See also ==
- Orphan work
