= Journal of Contemporary Criminal Justice =

The Journal of Contemporary Criminal Justice
- Discipline: Criminology
- Language: English
- Edited by: Chris Eskridge

Publication details
- History: 1978 -present
- Publisher: SAGE Publications
- Frequency: Quarterly
- Impact factor: 1.857 (2017)

Standard abbreviations
- ISO 4: J. Contemp. Crim. Justice

Indexing
- ISSN: 1043-9862
- LCCN: 89656388
- OCLC no.: 516535001

Links
- Journal homepage; Online access; Online archive

The Journal of Contemporary Criminal Justice is a quarterly peer-reviewed academic journal that covers the field of criminology. The editor-in-chief is Chris Eskridge (University of Nebraska–Lincoln). It was established in 1978 and is currently published by SAGE Publications.

== Abstracting and indexing ==
The Journal of Contemporary Criminal Justice is abstracted and indexed in:

- Academic Search Complete
- Academic Search Premier
- Business Source Complete
- Business Source Premier
- Scopus
- ZETOC
