= Data Securities International =

Technology company

Data Securities International, DSI was a technology escrow administration company based in San Francisco, California. Founded in 1982, the company escrows source code and other maintenance materials for licensees and stakeholders. In 1997, Iron Mountain Incorporated acquired the company. In 2021, Iron Mountain sold DSI (now IPM within IRM) for $220 million.

Dwight C. Olson was the founder of Data Securities International.

== History ==
Data Securities International was founded in 1982. The company grew steadily over the years before being sold to Iron Mountain in 1997.

Data Securities International introduced the concept in the mid-1980s for a Total Software Value (TSV) that uses the composites of Ownership Value (OV) or the software inventory, Market Value (MV), and Internal Cost Savings (ICS) as values and influencing variables of software as a financial asset. A TSV software inventory valuation (OV) analysis looks at the sum total (or bundle) of the various software components or intellectual assets that make software usable as a product.
