= FreeMIDI =

Macintosh multimedia software

FreeMIDI was a popular virtual studio management application by Mark of the Unicorn (MOTU) for the Classic Mac OS. It was used to mimic the physical setup of MIDI devices that are connected to the computer and provide applications and the Mac OS a way for referencing them.

OMS by Opcode also performed similar duties. Some MIDI interfaces provided drivers for both FreeMIDI and OMS, while some only included drivers for one or the other. FreeMIDI included an OMS Compatibility Mode which allowed FreeMIDI to communicate with devices in OMS. OMS was generally more popular than FreeMIDI owing to its greater third-party support.

Under macOS, neither FreeMIDI or OMS are used, as those duties are covered by macOS's included Audio MIDI Setup utility. Audio MIDI Setup is not as robust as either application, however; it lacks a prepopulated list of manufacturers and models of MIDI devices for users to optimize their setup. It also lacks any way to define lists of patches within the MIDI devices for a DAW to read in order to ensure proper playback. FreeMIDI remained popular with music producers who ran older Macintosh equipment well into the 2000s.
