= Orphan film =

Film that has been abandoned by its creator or copyright holder

An orphan film is a motion picture work that has been abandoned by its owner or copyright holder. The term may also refer to any film that has suffered neglect.

== History ==
The exact origin of the term orphan film is unclear. By the 1990s, however, film archivists were commonly using this colloquialism to refer to motion pictures abandoned by their owners. Before the end of the decade, the phrase emerged as the governing metaphor for film preservation, first in the United States, then internationally. As early as October 1950, Industrial Marketing magazine referred to 16mm industrial sales movies as orphan films. Restoration expert Robert Gitt was quoted using the metaphor as early as 1992, to refer to silent-era films, newsreels, and kinescopes.

== Definition ==
Historians, archivists, law-makers, and scholars define the term in both a narrow and a broad sense. A report from the Librarian of Congress, Film Preservation 1993, offered a first definition. As a category of so-called orphan works, orphan films are those “that lack either clear copyright holders or commercial potential” to pay for their preservation. However, a much wider group of works fall under the orphan rubric when the term is expanded to refer to all manner of films that have been neglected. The neglect might be physical (a deteriorated film print), commercial (an unreleased movie), cultural (censored footage), historical (a little-seen industrial production), or technical (footage from television commercials or music videos).

This broader conception is typically illustrated by a list of orphaned genres or categories. In Redefining Film Preservation: A National Plan (1994), the Librarian of Congress enumerated newsreels, actuality footage, silent films, experimental works, home movies, independent fiction and documentary films, political commercials, amateur footage, along with advertising, educational, and industrial films as culturally significant orphans. To this, the National Film Preservation Foundation adds animation, ethnic films, anthropological footage, and fragments. (See "What Are Orphan Films".)

Within a decade, the epithet was adopted by scholars and educators. In The Film Experience: An Introduction (2004), for example, Timothy Corrigan and Patricia White include a section on orphan films, defining them simply as "Any sort of films that have survived but have no commercial interests to pay the costs of their preservation."

Defined in this way, more films are orphans than not. Many are more accurately described as “footage,” recordings shot on celluloid but not intended to be completed works or theatrical releases. The millions of feet of home movies and newsreel outtakes alone outnumber the quantity of film stock used to make all of the feature films ever released by Hollywood studios.

== Movement ==
The resurgent interest in these films is due to their value as cultural and historical artifacts. Documentarians, filmmakers, historians, curators, collectors and scholars have joined forces with archivists because they deem orphans not only historical documents, but also evidence of alternative, suppressed, minority or forgotten histories.

Since 1999, hundreds of these devotees have gathered for the biennial Orphan Film Symposium. In their introduction to the anthology Mining the Home Movie (2008), Karen Ishizuka and Patricia Zimmermann assess the impact of these symposiums:

In 1999, film historian Dan Streible and several other interdisciplinary faculty members at the University of South Carolina initiated a symposium on orphan films that drew together archivists, film historians, artists, curators, and other to discuss and screen works within a rigorous scholarly context. Orphan Film Symposium I was entitled “Orphans of the Storm: Saving Orphan Films in the Digital Age” and was held in September 1999. Orphan Film Symposium II, “Documenting the 20th Century,” was held in March 2001; Orphan Film Symposium III, “Sound/Music/Voice: Listening to Orphan Films,” in September 2002; and Orphan Film Symposium IV, “On Location: Place and Region in Forgotten Films,” in March 2004. These four symposia have functioned to generate new research and curatorial activities and have lent increased visibility to the orphan film cause. They have also provided a significant academic and curatorial context for amateur film research. The Orphan Film symposia, together with an important presence for orphan, amateur, and small-gauge films within the Association of Moving Image Archivists throughout the 1990s and afterward, suggest the coalescing of various international and regional movements to look more closely at these subaltern cinemas.

After the fifth Orphan Film Symposium ("Science, Industry & Education") took place at the University of South Carolina (March 2006), New York University took up the project, incorporating it into the Department of Cinema Studies and its Moving Image Archiving and Preservation master's program at the Tisch School of the Arts. All subsequent events have originated from NYU, usually co-presented with other organizations.

Orphans 6, 7, and 8 took place in New York City. The 2008 symposium focused on neglected films and videos by, about, against, and under "the state." The 2010 edition, "Moving Pictures Around the World," included speakers from 17 nations. In 2012, Museum of the Moving Image in Queens co-hosted the eighth symposium, "Made to Persuade". The event returned to MoMI in 2018 "Love" and 2024 ("Work & Play").

The ninth and tenth symposiums took place at major institutions outside of New York. EYE Film Institute Netherlands hosted Orphans 9 ("The Future of Obsolescence," 2014) in Amsterdam, attracting attendees from 30 nations. Orphans 10 (Orphans X, "Sound," 2016) convened at the Library of Congress Packard Campus for Audio-Visual Conservation in Culpeper, Virginia. Also international biennials included a second symposium with Eye Filmmuseum in 2020, "Water, Climate, Migration," done online curing Covid restrictions thanks to Ambulante film festival of Mexico, as well as the 2022 gathering on "Counter-Archives" at Concordia University in Tiohti:áke / Montreal.

In 2001, members of these academic-archival professions began referring to an “orphan film movement.” As archivist-scholar Caroline Frick has written, some of the most active participants identify themselves as “orphanistas,” passionate advocates for saving, studying, and screening neglected cinema. In 2004, visual anthropologist Emily Cohen wrote that the movement's creative and intellectual ferment constituted an “Orphanista Manifesto.”

Rick Prelinger (Prelinger Archives) and Howard Besser (NYU professor of cinema studies) answer the questions "What is an orphan film?" and "What is the Orphan Film Symposium?" (Recorded at the University of South Carolina, March 2006) running time 2:55

More pragmatically, the group's rising influence in the United States affected discourse and policies about copyright reform, joining the broader media reform movement. Examples of this include the 2003 Supreme Court case Eldred v. Ashcroft and the 2006 Copyright Office Report on Orphan Works. In September 2008, the U.S. Senate passed a bill (S.2913) "to provide a limitation on judicial remedies in copyright infringement cases involving orphan works," but the House of Representatives adjourned before addressing the measure.

Although U.S. copyright stakeholders confine their discussion to the narrower definition of an orphan (a work with no identifiable rightsholder or whose rights holder cannot be located), the broader conception—an orphan film as a neglected object—continues to be used internationally. Film archivists working quite separately in different nations have used the orphan metaphor for a decade. At the Cinemateca de Cuba, for example, the term "huérfanos" has been used to conceptualize the lost and abandoned works of Cuban film history, its "orfandad." The Nederlands Filmmuseum preserves and programs its "Bits & Pieces" series of unidentified film fragments, its "foundlings." The China Film Archive in Beijing uses a translatable orphan film metaphor as well.

Another indication of the international interest in orphan films was filmmaker Martin Scorsese's announcement of a World Cinema Foundation (WCF) at the 2007 Cannes Film Festival. Press reports stated that the WCF would preserve "orphan" films. By 2008, however, the WCF's mission statement referred only to "neglected" films rather than orphans, as the foundation helps fund preservation of lesser known theatrical motion pictures, which remain under the legal ownership of some party. In 2013, the foundation proper was renamed the World Cinema Project, which is overseen by The Film Foundation Scorsese created in 1990.

In April 2008, the International Federation of Film Archives (FIAF) endorsed a "Declaration on Fair Use and Access" which stated "FIAF supports efforts to clarify the legal status of 'orphan' motion pictures and related promotional and historical materials for the purpose of preservation and public access." Shortly thereafter, on June 4, 2008, the European Union announced the signing of a new "Memorandum of Understanding" on orphan works. The EU's Digital Libraries Initiative produced the statement. Signatories included key institutions in moving image archiving and representatives of rightsholders: Association des Cinematheques Europeennes - Association of European Film Archives and Cinematheques, the British Library, European Film Companies Alliance, Federation Europeenne des Realisateurs de L'audiovisuel, Federation Internationale des Associations de Producteurs de Films, and the International Federation of Film Distributors. In 2010, the Association of European Film Archives and Cinematheques carried out a survey among its members to assess the dimension of orphan films. According to this survey, more than 210,000 films preserved in Europe's Film Archives are considered orphan. In October 2012, the EU adopted the Orphan Works Directive 2012/28/EU which legally allows the (online) use of orphan works across Europe, provided that a search for the rights holder has been carried before. The European Union addressed copyright, access, and preservation issues via FORWARD, a three-year project (2013-2016) to create a registry of orphan films. Officially termed "Framework for a EU-wide Audiovisual Orphan Works Registry," the project aimed to create a simplified process for determining the rights status of moving image works. See Project-FORWARD.eu. In 2020, the BFI created "Unlocking Orphan Films" aiming to involved "film lovers in the task of performing diligent searches on untapped film archive material owned by the BFI and other regional film archives." (See .

== See also ==
- Orphan works
- Public domain film
- Film preservation
- Association of Moving Image Archivists
- The Texas Archive of the Moving Image
- Alan Smithee
- Abandonware
