= Trends in Amplification =

- Discipline: Otorhinolaryngology
- Language: English
- Edited by: Charles J Limb

Publication details
- History: 1996-present
- Publisher: SAGE Publications
- Impact factor: 2.500 (2015)

Standard abbreviations
- ISO 4: Trends Amplif.

Indexing
- ISSN: 1084-7138
- LCCN: 2007214830
- OCLC no.: 33136102

Links
- Online access; Online archive

Trends in Amplification is a peer-reviewed academic journal that publishes papers four times a year in the field of Otorhinolaryngology. The journal's editor is Charles J Limb. It has been in publication since 1996 and is currently published by SAGE Publications. According to the Journal Citation Reports, the journal has a 2015 impact factor of 2.500.

== Scope ==
Trends in Amplification publishes original, evidence-based research and reviews focusing on hearing aids, cochlear implants, and aural rehabilitation. The journal publishes original articles and clinical reports as well as tutorials and reviews in the field of amplification. Trends in Amplification is primarily intended as a resource for scholars and practicing audiologists.

== Abstracting and indexing ==
Trends in Amplification is abstracted and indexed in the following databases:

- Academic Onefile
- EMBASE
- General Onefile
- SCOPUS
- ZETOC
