= Heidi Fraser-Krauss =

Chief executive officer at Jisc, UK

Heidi Fraser-Krauss is chief executive officer at Jisc. She was appointed in September 2021. Fraser-Krauss was previously executive director of corporate services at the University of Sheffield.

She holds a degree in psychology and management studies from the University of Glasgow and has previously worked at University of St Andrews and University of York. Fraser-Krauss has been chair of Universities and College Information Systems Association (ucisa), and chair of the Russell Group Universities IT Directors group (RUGIT). Her research area concerns how communication in teams supports innovation. Fraser-Krauss was named female CIO of the year by Computing Magazine in 2017.
