= Orphan Works Directive =

European Union directive

Directive 2012/28/EU
- European Union directive
- Title: Orphan Works Directive
- Made by: European Parliament & Council
- Made under: Article 53(1), 62 and 114
- Journal reference: L299, 27 October 2012, pp. 1–8

History
- Date made: 25 October 2012
- Entry into force: 29 October 2014
- Implementation date: 30 October 2014

Directive 2012/28/EU is a directive of the European Parliament and European Council enacted on 25 October 2012 that pertains to certain uses of orphan works. Hence it is often referred to as the Orphan Works Directive (OWD).

The directive sets out common rules on the digitisation and online display of orphan works. After a diligent search has been completed, a work can be registered at the orphan works register of the European Union Intellectual Property Office. Registering a work at that database allows for certain permitted uses of that work by cultural heritage institutions. Only such institutions are allowed to submit an orphaned work to the register. In case a copyright holder comes forward later, they are entitled to stop the institution's usage of the work and to ask for a retroactive license fee.

The directive's diligent search requirements have been criticized as burdensome and unworkable.

== Basis ==
Orphan works are works like books, newspaper articles, or films, which may be protected under copyright but for which the copyright holder cannot be found. A substantial portion of the collections of Europe's cultural institutions are orphan works (e.g. the British Library estimates that 40 per cent of its copyrighted collections, 150 million works in total, are orphan works). Orphan works are not available for legal use by filmmakers, archivists, writers, musicians, and broadcasters. Public libraries, educational institutions and museums, that digitise old manuscripts, books, sound recordings and film, may choose to not digitise orphan works, or make orphan works available to the public, for fear that a re-appearing rights-holder may sue them for damages.

The EU had set out large-scale digitisation programs (such as Europeana) and in order for these programs to be successful, common rules on how to deal with orphan works needed to be established.

By early 2016, more than three years after the directive's enactment, the orphan works register only contained 1,435 works, which critics cited as evidence "that the EU approach to orphan works is unreasonably complex and won’t adequately address the problem it’s trying to fix," namely enabling mass digitization efforts. After six years, in 2018, the number had reached 6,000.

== Works Covered by the Directive ==
This directive applies to the following orphan works that were created in the EU:

- printed works (books, journals, magazines and newspapers)
- cinematographic and audio-visual works
- phonograms
- works embedded or incorporated in other works or phonograms (e.g. pictures in a book)

Under certain conditions, the directive can also apply to unpublished works (such as letters or manuscripts). Whether orphaned software and video games fall under the audiovisual works definition is debated.

== Function ==
The directive provides regulations on how to identify orphan works. An organisation that wishes to digitise a work in question has to conduct a scrupulous search to find its copyright holder. In this search, it should rely on sources such as databases and registries like ARROW for text and image-based works. A registry for orphan film is currently developed by ACE – Association of European Film Archives and Cinematheques in the FORWARD project. A diligent search guideline and tool has also been developed by the EnDOW project. By 2017, its tool for diligent searches was available for 20 European Union Member states. Around that time, a study by EnDOW researchers warned that "the absence of hierarchical validity of the appropriate sources for Diligent Search leave the clearing of rights uncertain" and that "only the free accessibility of hierarchized sources will make Diligent Search workable". At the time of the launch of the directive in 2012, it had been hoped that other sectors would develop similar information databases.

The directive also establishes that if a search does not find the identity or location of the copyright holder, the work shall be officially recognised as an orphan work. This status shall be valid for the whole of the European Union, which means the organisation will be able to make it available online in all Member States. The directive also foresaw the establishment of a single European registry of all recognised orphan works to be set up and run by EUIPO, the European Union Intellectual Property Office based in Alicante. This database went live in October 2014 as a publicly accessible online platform.

Works identified as orphan works can be used by beneficiary organisations to achieve aims related to their public interest mission. They will be allowed to conclude public-private partnerships with commercial operators and to generate revenues from the use of orphan works to cover digitisation costs.

Under this directive, a reappearing copyright-holder can assert his/her copyright and thereby end the orphan work status, and is entitled to license fees from the cultural institution for its usage of the work while it had orphan status.

The Directive was influenced by a survey of the state of intellectual property law in the United Kingdom called the Hargreaves Review of Intellectual Property and Growth. James Boyle, one of the experts consulted for the Review, acknowledged the directive as "a start", but offered this criticism of the resulting policy:

In brief, the scheme is heavily institutional, statist, and inflexible. Its provisions can really only be used by educational and cultural heritage institutions, only for non-profit purposes, with lengthy and costly licensing provisions designed to protect the monetary interests of—almost certainly—nonexistent rightsholders. The EU seemed never to grasp the idea that citizens also need to have access to orphan works, for uses that almost certainly present no threat to any living rightsholder.

== Implementation ==
The date for implementation was 30 October 2014.

=== Implementation in the UK ===
Before the OWD in 2012 a number of studies had been published aiming to shed light on issues concerning Orphan Works.

- 2006: Gowers Review of Intellectual Property
- 2009: Joint Information Systems Committee (Jisc)/Naomi Korn In from the Cold report
- 2011: British Library/ARROW (Accessible Registries of Rights Information and Orphan Works) Seeking New Landscapes report by Barbara Stratton
- 2011: Digital Opportunities by Ian Hargreaves
- 2012: UK Intellectual Property Office Orphan Works Impact Assessment report
