= Orphan work =

Copyright-protected work for which rightsholders are positively indeterminate

An orphan work is a copyright-protected work for which rightsholders are positively indeterminate or uncontactable. Sometimes the names of the originators or rightsholders are known, yet it is impossible to contact them because additional details cannot be found. A work can become orphaned through rightsholders being unaware of their holding, or by their demise (e.g. deceased persons or defunct companies) and establishing inheritance has proved impracticable. In other cases, comprehensively diligent research fails to determine any authors, creators or originators for a work. Since 1989, the amount of orphan works in the United States has increased dramatically since some works are published anonymously, assignments of rights are not required to be disclosed publicly, and registration is optional. As a result, many works' statuses with respect to who holds which rights remain unknown to the public even when those rights are being actively exploited by authors or other rightsholders.

== Extent ==
Precise figures of orphan works are not readily available, even though libraries, archives and museums hold a vast number of them. In April 2009, a study estimated that the collections of public sector organisations in the UK held about 25 million orphan works. Examples of orphan works include photographs that do not note the photographer, such as photos from scientific expeditions and historical images, old folk music recordings, little known novels and other literature. Software which becomes an orphaned work is usually known as abandonware. In 2015, the Computerspielemuseum Berlin estimated that around 50% of their video game collection consisted of at least partial orphans. Source code escrow can prevent software orphaning but is seldom applied.

== Impact ==
In countries whose laws do not specifically allow for the use of orphan works, orphan works are not available for legal use by filmmakers, archivists, writers, musicians or broadcasters. Because rightsholders cannot be identified and located to obtain permission, historical and cultural records such as period film footage, photographs, and sound recordings cannot be legally incorporated in contemporary works in such countries (unless the incorporation qualifies as fair use). Public libraries, educational institutions, and museums that digitise old manuscripts, books, sound recordings, and film may choose to not digitise orphan works or make orphan works available to the public for fear that a re-appearing rightsholder may sue them for damages.

== Causes ==
According to Neil Netanel, the increase in orphan works is the result of two factors: (1) that copyright terms have been lengthened, and (2) that copyright is automatically conferred without registration or renewal. Only a fraction of old copyrighted works are available to the public. Netanel argues that rightsholders have "no incentive to maintain a work in circulation" or otherwise make their out-of-print content available unless they can hope to earn more money doing so than by producing new works or engaging in more lucrative activities. Some works are deliberately published in ways that make them orphan works (or make certain rights to them "orphan rights"). In particular, all anonymously self-published works are by definition orphan works, regardless of how much revenue they are generating for their authors through advertising or other means. Authors of orphan works argue that these modes of publishing and of earning revenues from orphan works are increasing, and are especially attractive to "whistleblowers, leakers, writers on controversial or stigmatized topics, and writers who fear harassment or retaliation if they are 'outed' or can be identified or located."

== Specifics by country ==
=== Canada ===
Canada has created a supplemental licensing scheme, under Section 77 of its Copyright Act, that allows licenses for the use of published works to be issued by the Copyright Board of Canada on behalf of unlocatable rightsholders after a prospective licensor has "made reasonable efforts to locate the [holders of] the copyright". As of June 2023, the Board had issued 321 such licenses and denied 36 applications.

=== European Union ===
The European Commission (EC), the executive branch of the European Union (EU), created a report on Digital Preservation of Orphan Works and Out-of-Print Works in 2007.

On 4 June 2008, European representatives of museums, libraries, archives, audiovisual archives and rightsholders signed a Memorandum of Understanding calling for an orphan works legislation supported by rightsholders that would help cultural institutions to digitize books, films, and music whose authors are unknown, making them available to the public online. In 2009, the Strategic Content Alliance and the Collections Trust published a report on the scope and impact of orphan works and their effect on the delivery of web services to the public.

In October 2012, the European Union adopted Directive 2012/28/EU on Orphan Works. It applies to orphan works that were created in the EU as printed works (books, journals, magazines and newspapers), cinematographic and audio-visual works, phonograms, and works embedded or incorporated in other works or phonograms (e.g. pictures in a book). Under certain conditions, the directive can also apply to unpublished works (such as letters or manuscripts). Whether orphaned software and video games ("Abandonware") fall under the audiovisual works definition is a matter debated by scholars.

The Directive was influenced by a survey of the state of intellectual property law in the United Kingdom called the Hargreaves Review of Intellectual Property and Growth. James Boyle, one of the experts consulted for the Review, acknowledged the directive as "a start", but offered this criticism of the resulting policy:

In brief, the scheme is heavily institutional, statist, and inflexible. Its provisions can really only be used by educational and cultural heritage institutions, only for non-profit purposes, with lengthy and costly licensing provisions designed to protect the monetary interests of—almost certainly—nonexistent rightsholders. The EU seemed never to grasp the idea that citizens also need to have access to orphan works, for uses that almost certainly present no threat to any living rightsholder.

By 2018, six years after the enactment of the directive, around 6,000 works had been entered into the orphan works registry that it created. Critics cited the low numbers as evidence "that the EU approach to orphan works is unreasonably complex and won’t adequately address the problem it’s trying to fix," namely enabling mass digitization efforts.

=== Hungary ===
Act LXXVI of 1999 on Copyright lays out explicit regulations governing orphan works in Chapter IV/A, "The Use of Orphan Works." Per Section 41/B, for a fee, orphan works may be granted a non-exclusive and non-transferable license for use by the Hungarian Intellectual Property Office. The work may be licensed for up to five years and is only valid within Hungary. The license does not "confer the right for granting further licenses or adaptation of the work."

=== India ===
Article 31A of the Copyright Act, 1957 contains provisions for compulsory licenses in unpublished or published works in cases where "the work is withheld from the public in India, the author is dead or unknown or cannot be traced, or the owner of the copyright in such work cannot be found." In these cases, the interested party may submit an application requesting licensing rights to the Appellate Board.

=== Japan ===
Orphan works are addressed in the Japanese Copyright Act, Chapter II, Section 8, Article 67, "Exploitation of a Work If the Copyright Owner Is Unknown." This states that a person interested in licensing an orphan work may do so "after depositing compensation for the copyright owner in an amount fixed by the Commissioner [of the Agency for Cultural Affairs] as equivalent to the ordinary rate of royalties."

=== Philippines ===
Any works owned by a previous owner or defunct company and no one takes them over, their ownership and usage rights will be transferred to the Government of the Philippines through the National Library of the Philippines (NLP) to prevent immediate widespread usage by the general public without permission or proper channels to use them while their copyright does not expire yet and from retaining their legal limbo as part of the government's duties and responsibilities to impose copyright and proprty laws, according to Section 139 of the Revised Corporation Code.

=== Saudi Arabia ===
Copyright Law in Saudi Arabia is governed by Royal Decree No. M/11 (1989) and does not integrate the term "orphan works." Article 16, "Mandatory Licenses," contains provisions for situations in which publication licenses may be granted after the expiration of copyright. These situations include those in which no copies of the work are available "at a price comparable to the price of similar works" or if the work is out of print. These situations are contingent on whether the author or copyright owner makes the works available.

=== South Korea ===
The South Korean Copyright Act alludes to orphan works in Section 4, Article 50, "Exploitation of Works Whose Holder of Author's Economic Right is Unknown." Under these provisions, a person may exploit works whose "holder of author's economic right" cannot be identified after a "considerable effort to meet the standards described by the Presidential Decree." The person must pay "a remuneration as determined by the Minister of Culture, Sports and Tourism after obtaining his or her approval." These permissions only apply if the work in question is not by a foreigner.

=== United Kingdom ===
On 29 October 2014, the Intellectual Property Office (IPO) launched an online licensing scheme for orphan works. It differs from the EU's directive (which no longer applies in the UK) in several aspects, e.g. by allowing anyone instead of just cultural institutions to submit works, while however imposing application and license fees. A launch press release by the IPO was entitled "UK opens access to 91 million Orphan Works", but four years later, only 144 licenses had been granted, covering 877 works. On 1 January 2021, when the UK left the EU after the end of the Brexit transition period, the EU orphan works exception was repealed from UK law and ceased to apply, whilst the IPO scheme continued.

=== United States ===
As of 2015, no formal legislation governing the general use of orphan works has been passed in the United States. The U.S. Copyright Office released Orphan Works and Mass Digitization: A Report on the Register of Copyrights in June 2015, which provided an overview on the state of orphan works in the United States and recommended appropriate legislation.

Under the provisions of 17 U.S.C. § 108(h), public libraries and archives in the United States have some permissions to produce copies of orphan works.

== See also ==
- Copyright formalities
- Orphan film
- Orphaned technology
- Permission culture
- Lostwave
