= Dwight C. Olson =

American technology pioneer

- Occupations: technology escrow, author
- Known for: Data Securities International

Dwight C. Olson was the founder of Data Securities International.

== Education ==
Olson received a bachelor's degree in mathematics and teaching credentials from Augsburg University in Minneapolis, Minnesota.

== Accomplishments ==
Olson began his career in the research and development of supercomputers, parallel processing systems and related application architectures in the 1960s and 1970s.

Olsen founded Data Securities International in 1982, which pioneered technology escrow and is known as the father of technology escrow.

Olson is a former chairman of the Board of Governors of Certified Licensing Professionals, Inc (CLP), a former President of the Licensing Executives Society, USA and Canada, and he has served as chair of LESI IP Valuation committee.

Olson was an associate member of the American Bar Association's Electronic Commerce Law and Information Security Committee working on the ABA's Digital Signature Guidelines.

Olson is the author of Northern Lights: the beauty of the Forgotten Scandinavian Enamel Artisans, published in 2019 (ISBN 978-0-578-44439-0).

Olson is the author of The Long Journey to Software Valuation, published in 2020 (ISBN 978-1-7344129-0-1).
