= Geodætisk Institut =

Emblem

Geodætisk Institut (1928–1987) was a Danish state-run cartographic institute.

It was created by law number 82, of 31 March 1928, combining Generalstabens Topografiske Afdeling and Den danske Gradmaaling, two institutions that did somewhat overlapping cartographic and topographic mapping of Denmark. It was initially part of Ministry of War (Krigsministeret), later Ministry of Defence (Forsvarsministeret).

In the years 1940–1953 Geodætisk Institut made the second nationwide precision landscape levelling of Denmark. The first was done 1885–1905 by Den danske Gradmaaling. The height fix point remains Århus Domkirke (Dansk Normal Nul (DNN)), as established in 1905. A third levelling was done 1982–1994. This formed the basic for the new height system DVR90, replacing DNN. The height fix point remains Aarhus Domkirke, however its kote was changed from 5.6150m to 5.570m in DVR90. Geodætisk Institut made the third topographic mapping of Denmark in the years 1966–1987, based on aerial photography (First 1842–1887, second 1887–1938). Starting in 1953 Geodætisk Institut made a whole set of new maps 1:25,000, 1:50,000 and 1:100.000, all based on UTM/ED50 map projections, where Denmark is located in zone 32 and 33. This work was finished in 1975.

The institute developed the computer GIER (Geodætisk Instituts elektroniske regnemaskine)) which was a step towards the establishment of a Danish computer industry.

In 1989, Geodætisk Institut was combined with Matrikeldirektoratet and Søkortarkivet, to form Kort & Matrikelstyrelsen (now Geodatastyrelsen).

== Geodætisk Institut departments ==
- Administrativ Afdeling
- Geodætisk Afdeling I
- Geodætisk Afdeling II
- Seismisk Afdeling
- Topografisk Afdeling
- Teknisk Afdeling
