= Open Music System =

Macintosh multimedia software

Open Music System (OMS) was a virtual studio management application by Opcode for the Classic Mac OS. Similar to FreeMIDI by Mark of the Unicorn and Audio MIDI Setup by Apple, OMS used a GUI to manage MIDI devices by providing DAW applications and the Mac OS with information regarding the physical setup of MIDI devices connected to the computer.

OMS was orphaned by its owners, Gibson, in 2009.
