= UCISA =

Higher Education

- Formation: 1 April 1993
- Type: Charitable organisation
- Location: Oxford
- Services: Digital Technologies in Education
- CEO: Deborah Green
- Website: www.ucisa.ac.uk

UCISA (the Universities and Colleges Information Systems Association, sometimes stylised as ucisa) is a United Kingdom association which represents the whole of higher education, and increasingly further education, in the provision and development of academic, management and administrative information systems. It is a charitable company, based at Ruskin College, Oxford, England. Its current CEO is Deborah Green, who joined in May 2019 from the University of Hull.

== History ==
UCISA was formed on 1 April 1993, by a merger of three bodies: the Inter-University Computing Committee (IUCC), the Polytechnics and Colleges Computer Committee (PCCC), and the Management Information Systems Committee (MISC). This merger took place in response to the Further and Higher Education Act 1992 which effectively removed the binary distinction between universities and polytechnics/colleges, creating a single higher education sector.

== Description ==
UCISA represents almost all the major UK universities and higher education colleges and has a growing membership among further education colleges, other educational institutions and commercial organisations interested in information systems and technology in UK education, providing a network of contacts and a lobbying voice.

Information systems and technology are increasingly important in further and higher education. The UK Government, funding bodies and powerful commercial interests recognise this, each bringing its agenda and initiatives to bear on individual institutions. In this evermore complex and demanding climate, UCISA plays an important role as the key membership organisation representing those responsible for delivering information systems and technology services in universities, colleges and related institutions.

Although mainly for the higher education sector, increasing integration, shared concerns across sectors mean that UCISA membership is appropriate for many other types of educational institution. UCISA is also relevant to those with a commercial interest in the education sector, especially through the annual conferences, which provide an opportunity to meet those involved in information systems and technology delivery within universities and colleges.

UCISA provides a national and international presence for the people who work on information systems and services. It helps them to share best practice, maximise cost-effectiveness, develop ideas and inform and support policy making within their institution, nationally and internationally.

== Aims ==
UCISA exists to promote excellence in the application of information systems and services in support of teaching, learning, research and administration in higher and further education. Its aims are to identify best practice and to spread its use through:

- the organisation of conferences, seminars and workshops;
- the promotion and support of collaboration between institutions;
- the publication, including electronic publication, of material;
- the promotion of development and research;
- and to inform and support policy-making processes within institutions and nationally on the cost-effective application of information systems and services.

== Organisation ==
The activities of UCISA are partly devolved to interest-specific working groups; these include: UCISA-CISG (Corporate Information Systems Group), UCISA-DEG (Digital Education Group), UCISA-DIG (Digital Infrastructure Group), UCISA-EA (Enterprise Architecture), UCISA-PG (Procurement Group), UCISA-PCMG (Project and Change Management Group), UCISA-SG (Security Group), UCISA-SSG (Support Services Group), UCISA-WiT (Women In Tech Group), and HEIDS (Higher Education Information Directors Scotland).

UCISA works with other bodies in the sector and associated sectors, such as HEFESTIS, Jisc, Becta, UKOLN, CAUDIT, AUDE, BUDFG and SCONUL.

In September 2022, UCISA agreed to a closer working relationship with Jisc.
