= Abandonware =

Software no longer sold or maintained

Abandonware is software (e.g., video games) that is no longer for sale (by conventional means) nor supported by the creator. If a software product reaches end-of-life and becomes abandonware, users are confronted with several potential problems: missing purchase availability (besides used software) and missing technical support, e.g. compatibility fixes for newer hardware and operating systems. In many cases, abandoned software has been distributed by websites, such as warez, for free. Several websites archive abandonware for download, including old versions of applications that are difficult to find by any other means. In response to the missing software support, sometimes the software's user community begins to provide support (bug fixes, compatibility adaptions etc.) even without available source code, internal software documentation and original developer tools.

Proponents of abandonware preservation argue that it is more ethical to make copies of such software than new software that still sells. Abandonware advocates also frequently cite historical preservation as a reason for trading abandoned software. Some game developers showed sympathy for abandonware websites as they preserve their classical game titles.

In most cases, software classed as abandonware is not in the public domain, as it has never had its original copyright officially revoked and some company or individual may still own rights. While sharing of such software is usually considered copyright infringement, in practice copyright holders rarely enforce their abandonware copyrights for a number of reasons – chiefly among which the software is technologically obsolete and therefore has no commercial value, therefore rendering copyright enforcement a pointless enterprise. Some publishers actively file Digital Millennium Copyright Act (DMCA) takedowns of abandonware and defend its copyright. Once the copyright on a piece of software has expired, it automatically falls into public domain. Such software can be legally distributed without restrictions. However, due to the length of copyright terms in most countries, this has yet to happen for most software.

There are alternatives for companies with a software product which faces the end-of-life instead of abandoning the software in an unsupported state. Some user-communities convince companies to voluntarily relinquish copyright on software, putting it into the public domain, or re-license it as freeware. Several companies decided to release the source code specifically to allow the user communities to provide further technical software support (bug fixes, compatibility adaptions etc.) themselves, e.g., by community patches or source ports to new computing platforms

== Description ==
The term abandonware refers to is software, typically computer or video games, that is no longer for sale through conventional channels or is no longer supported by the creator. The use of the abandonware term is controversial, as distributing out of print software and games is considered software piracy, and their copyright is not actually abandoned.

== Implications ==
If a software product reaches end-of-life and becomes abandonware, users are confronted with several potential problems: missing purchase availability (besides used software) and missing technical support, e.g. compatibility fixes for newer hardware and operating systems. These problems are exacerbated if software is bound to physical media with a limited life-expectancy (floppy disks, optical media etc.) and backups are impossible because of copy protection or copyright law. If a software is distributed only in a digital, DRM-locked form or as SaaS, the shutdown of the servers will lead to a public loss of the software. If the software product is without alternatives, the missing replacement availability becomes a challenge for continued software usage.

Once a software product becomes abandonware, there is a high risk that the source code becomes lost or irrecoverable even for its original developers, as multiple cases have shown. (Note: Some examples of games whose source code has been deemed lost include: Bouncer; Dragon's Lair; Icewind Dale II; Kingdom Hearts; Mad Dog McCree; Silent Hill)

One of many examples is the closure of Atari in Sunnyvale, California in 1996, when the original source codes of several milestones of video game history (such as Asteroids and Centipede) were thrown out as trash, some of which were later recovered. After the closure of Tapulous, Tap Tap Revenge became abandonware; there is also no way to retrieve the source code due to the app being sandboxed, thus making preserving it borderline impossible.

Unavailability of software and the associated source code can also be a hindrance for software archaeology and research. Some video game historians believe that this distribution is justified to preserve history given the lack of viable alternatives.

== Response to abandonware ==
=== Early abandonware websites ===
As response to the missing availability of abandonware, people have distributed old software since shortly after the beginning of personal computing, but the activity remained low-key until the advent of the Internet. In many cases, abandoned software has been distributed by websites, such as warez, for free. While trading old games has taken many names and forms, the term "abandonware" was coined by Peter Ringering in late 1996. Ringering found classic game websites similar to his own, contacted their webmasters, and formed the original Abandonware Ring in February 1997. This original webring was little more than a collection of sites linking to adventureclassicgaming.com. Another was a site indexing them all to provide a rudimentary search facility. In October 1997, the Interactive Digital Software Association sent cease and desist letters to all sites within the Abandonware Ring, which led to most shutting down. An unintended consequence was that it spurred others to create new abandonware sites and organizations that came to outnumber the original Ring members. Sites formed after the demise of the original Abandonware Ring include Abandonia, Bunny Abandonware and Home of the Underdogs. In later years abandonware websites actively acquired and received permissions from developers and copyright holders (e.g. Jeff Minter, Magnetic Fields or Gremlin Interactive) for legal redistribution of abandoned works; an example is World of Spectrum who acquired the permission from many developers and successfully retracted a DMCA case.

=== Archives ===
Several websites archive abandonware for download, including old versions of applications that are difficult to find by any other means. Much of this software fits the definition of "software that is no longer current, but is still of interest", but the line separating the use and distribution of abandonware from copyright infringement is blurry, and the term abandonware could be used to distribute software without proper notification of the owner.

The Internet Archive has created an archive of what it describes as "vintage software", as a way to preserve them. The project advocated for an exemption from the United States Digital Millennium Copyright Act to permit them to bypass copy protection, which was approved in 2003 for a period of three years. The exemption was renewed in 2006, and as of 27 October 2009, has been indefinitely extended pending further rulemakings. The Archive does not offer this software for download, as the exemption is solely "for the purpose of preservation or archival reproduction of published digital works by a library or archive." Nevertheless, in 2013 the Internet Archive began to provide antique games as browser-playable emulation via MESS, for instance the Atari 2600 game E.T. the Extra-Terrestrial. Since 23 December 2014 the Internet Archive presents via a browser based DOSBox emulation thousands of archived DOS/PC games for "scholarship and research purposes only".

Starting around 2006, the Library of Congress began the long-time preservation of video games with the game canon list. In September 2012 the collection had nearly 3,000 games from many platforms and also around 1,500 strategy guides. For instance, the source code of the unreleased PlayStation Portable game Duke Nukem: Critical Mass was discovered in August 2014 to be preserved at the Library of Congress.

Since around 2009 the International Center for the History of Electronic Games (ICHEG) has taken a five-pronged approach to video game preservation: original software and hardware, marketing materials and publications, production records, play capture, and finally the source code. In December 2013 the ICHEG received a donation of several SSI video games, for instance Computer Bismarck, including the source code for preservation. In 2014 a collection of Broderbund games and a "virtually complete" Atari arcade machine source code and asset collection was added.

=== Community support ===
In response to the missing software support, sometimes the software's user community begins to provide support (bug fixes, compatibility adaptions etc.) even without available source code, internal software documentation and original developer tools. Methods are debugging, reverse engineering of file and data formats, and hacking the binary executables. Often the results are distributed as unofficial patches. Notable examples are Fallout 2, Vampire: The Masquerade – Bloodlines or even Windows 98. Windows XP would also get a community support via unofficial service pack, with POSReady registry hack, as well as Windows 2000 receiving a fanmade extended kernel For instance, in 2012, when the multiplayer game Supreme Commander: Forged Alliance became unsupported abandonware as the official multiplayer server and support was shut down, the game community itself took over with a self-developed multiplayer server and client.

=== Re-releases by digital distribution ===
With the new possibility of digital distribution arising in mid-2000, the commercial distribution for many old titles became feasible again as deployment and storage costs dropped significantly. A digital distributor specialized in bringing old games out of abandonware is GOG.com (formerly called Good Old Games) who started in 2008 to search for copyright holders of classic games to release them legally and DRM-free again. For instance, on December 9, 2013, the real-time strategy video game Conquest: Frontier Wars was, after ten years of non-availability, re-released by gog.com, also including the source code.

== Arguments for distribution ==
=== From proponents ===
Proponents of abandonware preservation argue that it is more ethical to make copies of such software than new software that still sells. Some have incorrectly taken this to mean that abandonware is legal to distribute, although no software written since 1964 is old enough for copyright to have expired in the US. Even in cases where the original company no longer exists, the rights usually belong to someone else, though no one may be able to trace actual ownership, including the owners themselves.

Abandonware advocates also frequently cite historical preservation as a reason for trading abandoned software. Older computer media are fragile and prone to rapid deterioration, necessitating transfer of these materials to more modern, stable media and generation of many copies to ensure the software will not simply disappear. Users of still-functional older computer systems argue for the need of abandonware because re-release of software by copyright holders will most likely target modern systems or incompatible media instead, preventing legal purchase of compatible software.

=== From game developers with sympathy with abandonware ===
Some game developers showed sympathy for abandonware websites as they preserve their classical game titles.

[...] personally, I think that sites that support these old games are a good thing for both consumers and copyright owners. If the options are (a) having a game be lost forever and (b) having it available on one of these sites, I'd want it to be available. That being said, I believe a game is 'abandoned' only long after it is out of print. And just because a book is out of print does not give me rights to print some for my friends.

— Richard Garriott,

Is it piracy? Yeah, sure. But so what? Most of the game makers aren't living off the revenue from those old games anymore. Most of the creative teams behind all those games have long since left the companies that published them, so there's no way the people who deserve to are still making royalties off them. So go ahead—steal this game! Spread the love!

— Tim Schafer,

If I owned the copyright on Total Annihilation, I would probably allow it to be shared for free by now (four years after it was originally released)

— Chris Taylor,

== Law ==
In most cases, software classed as abandonware is not in the public domain, as it has never had its original copyright officially revoked and some company or individual may still own rights. While sharing of such software is usually considered copyright infringement, in practice copyright holders rarely enforce their abandonware copyrights for a number of reasons – chiefly among which the software is technologically obsolete and therefore has no commercial value, therefore rendering copyright enforcement a pointless enterprise. By default, this may allow the product to de facto lapse into the public domain to such an extent that enforcement becomes impractical.

Rarely has any abandonware case gone to court, but it is still unlawful to distribute copies of old copyrighted software and games, with or without compensation, in any Berne Convention signatory country.

=== Enforcement of copyright ===
Old copyrights are usually left undefended. This can be due to intentional non-enforcement by owners due to software age or obsolescence, but sometimes results from a corporate copyright holder going out of business without explicitly transferring ownership, leaving no one aware of the right to defend the copyright.

Even if the copyright is not defended, copying of such software is still unlawful in most jurisdictions when a copyright is still in effect. Abandonware changes hands on the assumption that the resources required to enforce copyrights outweigh benefits a copyright holder might realize from selling software licenses. Additionally, abandonware proponents argue that distributing software for which there is no one to defend the copyright is morally acceptable, even where unsupported by current law. Companies that have gone out of business without transferring their copyrights are an example of this; many hardware and software companies that developed older systems are long since out of business and precise documentation of the copyrights may not be readily available.

Often the availability of abandonware on the Internet is related to the willingness of copyright holders to defend their copyrights. For example, unencumbered games for Colecovision are markedly easier to find on the Internet than unencumbered games for Mattel Intellivision in large part because there is still a company that sells Intellivision games while no such company exists for the Colecovision.

=== DMCA ===
The Digital Millennium Copyright Act (DMCA) can be a problem for the preservation of old software as it prohibits required techniques. In October 2003, the US Congress passed 4 clauses to the DMCA which allow for reverse engineering software in case of preservation.

"3. Computer programs and video games distributed in formats that have become obsolete and which require the original media or hardware as a condition of access. ...The register has concluded that to the extent that libraries and archives wish to make preservation copies of published software and videogames that were distributed in formats that are (either because the physical medium on which they were distributed is no longer in use or because the use of an obsolete operating system is required), such activity is a noninfringing use covered by section 108(c) of the Copyright Act."

— Exemption to Prohibition on Circumvention of Copyright Protection Systems for Access Control Technologies

In November 2006, the Library of Congress approved an exemption to the DMCA that permits the cracking of copy protection on software no longer being sold or supported by its copyright holder so that they can be archived and preserved without fear of retribution.

=== US copyright law ===
Currently, US copyright law does not recognize the term or concept of abandonware while the general concept orphan works is recognized. There is a long-held concept of abandonment in trademark law as a direct result of the infinite term of trademark protection. Currently, a copyright can be released into the public domain if the owner clearly does so in writing; however this formal process is not considered abandoning, but rather releasing. Those who do not own a copyright cannot merely claim the copyright abandoned and start using protected works without permission of the copyright holder, who could then seek legal remedy.

Hosting and distributing copyrighted software without permission is illegal. Copyright holders, sometimes through the Entertainment Software Association, send cease and desist letters, and some sites have shut down or removed infringing software as a result. However, most of the Association's efforts are devoted to new games, due to those titles possessing the greatest value.

=== EU law ===
In the EU in 2012, an "Orphan Works Directive" (Directive 2012/28/EU) was constituted and is transferred into the members' laws. While the terminology has ambiguities regarding software and especially video games, some scholars argue that abandonware software video games fall under the definition of audiovisual works mentioned there.

=== Copyright expiration ===
Once the copyright on a piece of software has expired, it automatically falls into public domain. Such software can be legally distributed without restrictions. However, due to the length of copyright terms in most countries, this has yet to happen for most software. All countries that observe the Berne Convention enforce copyright ownership for at least 50 years after publication or the author's death. However, individual countries may choose to enforce copyrights for longer periods. In the United States, copyright durations are determined based on authorship. For most published works, the duration is 70 years after the author's death. However, for anonymous works, works published under a pseudonym or works made for hire, the duration is 120 years after creation, or 95 years after publication, whichever comes first. In France, copyright durations are 70 years after the relevant date (date of author's death or publication) for either class.

However, because of the length of copyright enforcement in most countries, it is likely that by the time a piece of software defaults to public domain, it will have long become obsolete, irrelevant, or incompatible with any existing hardware. Additionally, due to the relatively short commercial, as well as physical, lifespans of most digital media, it is entirely possible that by the time the copyright expires for a piece of software, it will no longer exist in any form. However, since the largest risk in dealing with abandonware is that of distribution, this may be mitigated somewhat by private users (or organizations such as the Internet Archive) making private copies of such software, which would then be legally redistributable at the time of copyright expiry.

== Alternatives to software abandoning ==
There are alternatives for companies with a software product which faces the end-of-life instead of abandoning the software in an unsupported state.

=== Availability as freeware ===
Some user-communities convince companies to voluntarily relinquish copyright on software, putting it into the public domain, or re-license it as freeware. Unlike so-called abandonware, it is perfectly legal to transfer public domain or freely licensed software.

Amstrad is an example which supports emulation and free distribution of CPC and ZX Spectrum hardware ROMs and software. Borland released "antique software" as freeware. Smith Engineering permits not-for-profit reproduction and distribution of Vectrex games and documentation.

Groups that lobby companies to release their software as freeware have met with mixed results. One example is the library of educational titles released by MECC. MECC was sold to Broderbund, which was sold to The Learning Company. When TLC was contacted about releasing classic MECC titles as freeware, the documentation proving that TLC held the rights to these titles could not be located, and therefore the rights for these titles are "in limbo" and may never be legally released. Lost or unclear copyrights to vintage out-of-print software is not uncommon, as rights to the No One Lives Forever series illustrates.

=== Support by source code release ===
The problem of missing technical support for a software can be most effectively solved when the source code becomes available. Therefore, several companies decided to release the source code specifically to allow the user communities to provide further technical software support (bug fixes, compatibility adaptions etc.) themselves, e.g. by community patches or source ports to new computing platforms. For instance, in December 2015 Microsoft released the Windows Live Writer source code to allow the community to continue the support.

Id Software and 3D Realms are early proponents in this practice, releasing the source code for the game engines of some older titles under a free software license (but not the actual game content, such as levels or textures). Also Falcon 4.0's lead designer Kevin Klemmick argued in 2011 that availability of the source code of his software for the community was a good thing: "I honestly think this [source code release] should be standard procedure for companies that decide not to continue to support a code base".

The chilling effect of drawing a possible lawsuit can discourage release of source code. Efforts to persuade IBM to release OS/2 as open source software were ignored since some of the code was co-developed by Microsoft.

Nevertheless, several notable examples of successfully opened commercial software exist, for instance, the web browser Netscape Communicator, which was released by Netscape Communications on March 31, 1998. The development was continued under the umbrella of the Mozilla Foundation and Netscape Communicator became the basis of several browsers, such as Mozilla Firefox.

Another important example for open sourced general software is the office suite StarOffice which was released by Sun Microsystems in October 2000 as OpenOffice.org and is in continued development as Collabora Online, LibreOffice and Apache OpenOffice, a broad range of enterprise level support options are available.

There are also many examples in the video game domain: Revolution Software released their game Beneath a Steel Sky as freeware and gave the engine's source code to the authors of ScummVM to add support for the game. Other examples are Myth II, Call to Power II and Microsoft's Allegiance which were released to allow the community to continue the support.

== See also ==
- List of commercial video games released as freeware
- List of proprietary source-available software
- List of commercial video games with available source code
- Orphaned technology
- Out of print
- Software archaeology
- Software release life cycle
