= Strategic Content Alliance =

Strategic Content Alliance is an initiative which works to improve the development of sustainable digital content originating from the UK public and not-for-profit sectors. The initiative was established to help build good practice across sectors through empirical research, joint piloting and prototyping and policy development to help build a UK Digital Public Space. Founded in March 2006 by the Jisc it is supported by Arts Council England, the British Library, the BBC, the Heritage Lottery Fund and the Wellcome Library.

== About ==
The Strategic Content Alliance, founded in March 2006 originated from the JISC Common Information Environment (CIE) work led by Dr Paul Miller.

The Strategic Content Alliance is a collaborative initiative that aims to develop links between organisations that share a common vision:

"To build a common information environment where users of publicly funded content can gain best value from the investment that has been made by reducing the barriers that currently inhibit access, use and re-use of digital content."

The SCA aims to build links between organisations and help them create digital content.

== Publications ==
One of the SCA's main goals is to create best practice documentation related to digital content. These are all licensed under Creative Commons licenses.

The publications encompass guides, briefing papers, navigation guides and toolkits. These publications consist of guidelines, principles, videos, reports and case studies cover the issues of:

- Emergent internet business models and sustainability.
- Intellectual Property Rights, Licensing and Rights Management.
- Building online audiences
- Web Optimisation

== Projects ==
A number of joint projects have been undertaken to test and evaluate a range of content related issues, ranging from content creation and enhancement strategies to copyright. These include:

- Chronicle, which has given UK colleges and universities access to broadcasts from the archives of BBC Northern Ireland (1960s-70s)
- JISC World War One Centenary activities to explore what opportunities there may be in the content held by organisations across the public-sector to enhance educational and research opportunities in UK universities and colleges and more broadly.
