= Orphaned technology =

Technology abandoned by the original developers

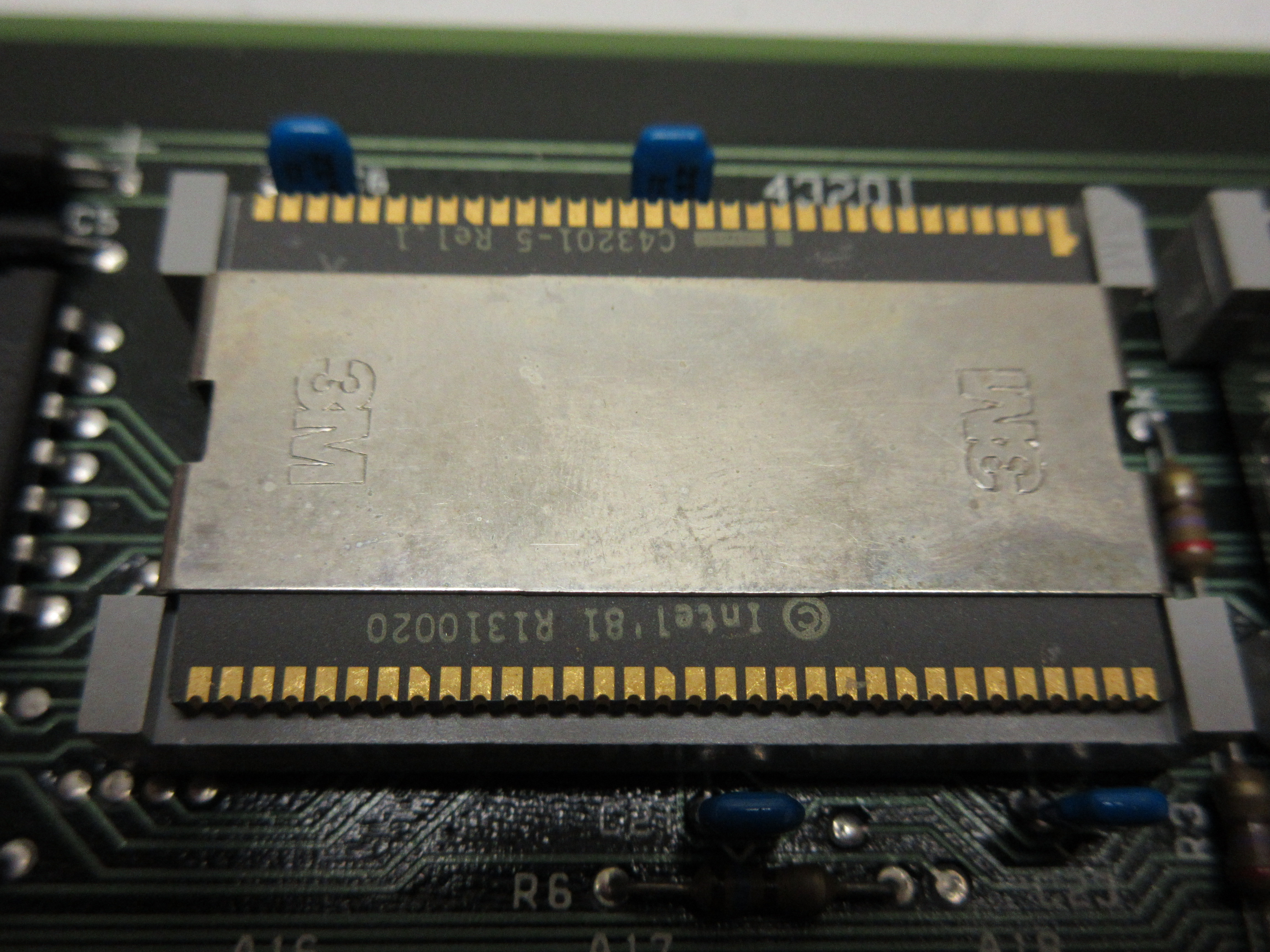
An Intel iAPX 432 processor, abandoned due to performance issues

Orphaned technology refers to computer technologies that have been abandoned by their original developers. The concept is not to be confused with deprecation, a gradual shift to newer technology; orphaned technology is usually abandoned abruptly or without a direct replacement. Unlike abandonware, orphaned technology refers to software, hardware, and the practices around them.

Users of orphaned technologies must often choose between continuing to use the technology, which may become less maintainable over time, or switch to supported technologies, possibly losing capabilities unique to the orphaned technology.

== Reasoning ==
While technology can be abandoned due to an unfavourable design or poor implementation, abandoning a technology can happen for a variety of reasons. There are instances where products are phased out of the market because they are no longer viable as business ventures, such as certain medical technologies.

Some orphaned technologies do not suffer complete abandonment or obsolescence. For instance, IBM's Silicon Germanium (SiGe) program produced an in situ doped alloy to replace the implantation step of the silicon semiconductor bipolar process. The technology was orphaned but was reused by a small team at IBM, becoming a leading product in high-volume communications.

Technologies orphaned due to their developers' failure can be adopted by new investors. One example is Wink, an IoT platform orphaned when its parent company Quirky filed for bankruptcy. However, the platform continued after its purchase by Flex.

== Examples ==
Some examples of orphaned technology include:

- Apple Lisa - 16/32-bit graphical computer
- Apple Newton PDA (Apple Newton) - tablet computer
- Apple Classic Mac OS - m68k and PowerPC operating system
- Coleco ADAM - 8-bit home computer
- DEC Alpha - 64-bit microprocessor
- Finale (scorewriter) music notation software developed by MakeMusic from 1988 until 2024
- HyperCard - hypermedia
- ICAD (KBE) - knowledge-based engineering
- Javelin Software - modeling and data analysis
- LISP machines - LISP oriented computers
- Mattel Aquarius
- Microsoft Bob - graphical helper
- Mosaic notation program - music notation application by Mark of the Unicorn
- Open Music System - Gibson
- OpenDoc - compound documents (Mac OS, OS/2)
- Poly-1 - parallel networked computer designed in New Zealand for education and training
- Prograph - visual programming system
- TI 99/4A - 16-bit home computer
- Windows 9x - x86 operating system

Symbolics Inc's operating systems, Genera and OpenGenera, were twice orphaned, as they were ported from LISP machines to computers using the Alpha 64-bit CPU.

== User groups ==
User groups often exist for specific orphaned technologies, such as The Hong Kong Newton User Group, Symbolics Lisp [Machines] Users' Group (now known as the Association of Lisp Users), and Newton Reference. The Save Sibelius group sprang into existence because Sibelius (scorewriter) users feared the application would be orphaned after its owners Avid Tech fired most of the development team, who were thereafter hired by Steinberg to develop the competing product, Dorico.

== See also ==
- Orphan works
- Abandonware
- Planned obsolescence
