= Copyright term =

Length of time that copyright continues

The copyright term is the length of time copyright subsists in a work before it passes into the public domain. In most of the world, this length of time is the life of the author plus either 50 or 70 years.

== Length of copyright ==
Copyright subsists for a variety of lengths in different jurisdictions. The length of the term can depend on several factors, including the type of work (e.g. musical composition or novel), whether the work has been published or not, and whether the work was created by an individual or a corporation. In most of the world, the default length of copyright is the life of the author plus either 50 or 70 years. In the United States, the term for most existing works is a fixed number of years after the date of creation or publication. In most countries (for example, the United States and the United Kingdom) copyright expires at the end of the calendar year in question.

The length and requirements for copyright duration are subject to change by legislation, and since the early 20th century there have been a number of adjustments made in various countries, which can make determining the copyright duration in a given country difficult. For example, the United States used to require copyrights to be renewed after 28 years to stay in force, and formerly required a copyright notice upon first publication to gain coverage. In Italy and France, there were post-wartime extensions that could increase the term by approximately six years in Italy and up to about 14 in France. Many countries have extended the length of their copyright terms (sometimes retroactively). International treaties, like the Berne Convention, establish minimum terms for copyrights, but these only apply to the signatory countries, and individual countries may grant longer terms than those set out in a treaty.

== Implications ==
=== Copyright term and the public domain ===
The extension of copyright term imposes tangible restrictions on the public domain. For instance, scholar Neil Netanel argued that Copyright Term Extension Act 1998 prevented the entering of works central to cultural heritage of the US into the public domain. He argued, culturally important dissemination, recasting, or incorporation into new expression is prevented due "to the copyright holder's veto". As examples he gave the adaption of the plot from novels such as The Great Gatsby and Peter Pan, the refashion of characters like Mickey Mouse, or the use of Tin Pan Alley songs like "Let's Do It (Let's Fall in Love)" for documentaries about the Great Depression.

=== Copyright term and orphan works ===
For the millions of older copyrighted works of less enduring popularity, it is difficult, or impossible, to trace the copyright ownership and determine who holds the particular rights that would have to be licensed for the use of the work. The problem of such orphan works stems from the extension of copyright term and the lack of requirement for the copyright owner to renew or register their copyright. In order to tackle this perceived problem some jurisdictions have revised their copyright laws to allow use of orphaned works, after diligent searches.

== Reception and discussion ==
Discussions about the optimal length of the copyright term (e.g. regarding the copyright's incentive for creative production) is a significant part of public and scientific discourse and reception.

One of the earlier and often cited positions is from the British politician Thomas Babington Macaulay who argued in an 1841 speech in the House of Commons that copyright is a monopoly and as such has generally negative effects on society. Although Macaulay's speech is widely reported, the reaction to it in the House of Commons is hard to find – Ricketson reports that following Macaulay's claims that the heirs of certain authors would block publication of their works:

At this point, the debate in the House of Commons fell into farce because there were claims by other speakers that they had no doubts (based on their own personal knowledge) that Richardson and Boswell's descendants would still have done the right thing and allowed reprinting, however much they abhorred their ancestors' works!

It is also worth noting that Macaulay is arguing here against term extension, he is not arguing against copyright. This point is well made by Macaulay himself:

The advantages arising from a system of copyright are obvious. It is desirable that we should have a supply of good books: we cannot have such a supply unless men of letters are liberally remunerated; and the least objectionable way of remunerating them is by means of copyright.

Liebowitz describes use of the term monopoly in relation to copyright as misleading, but "rhetorically effective"; while Towse writes that a more appropriate term is 'monopolistic competition'.

In 2009, a paper by Rufus Pollock of University of Cambridge scientifically quantified the optimal copyright term length at 15 years, significantly shorter than any currently existing copyright term, via an economical model with empirically-estimable parameters.

In 2013 scholar Petra Moser concluded in a paper on the impact of the copyright extension on the British Copyright Act 1814 that "longer copyrights raise the costs of accessing intellectual assets for consumers and other firms, which may discourage the diffusion of knowledge and decelerate the pace of cumulative innovation and learning-by-doing."

In 2014 a Rock, Paper, Shotgun article about the existence of orphaned classic video games and the suggestion of letting them enter the public domain after 20 years raised a controversial public debate about copyright terms and the public domain between game industry veterans John Walker, George Broussard, and Steve Gaynor.

A paper published in March 2015 in the Journal of Artificial Societies and Social Simulation analysed with a simulated model the relationship of scientific knowledge creation to copyright term length and concluded a decreased knowledge production on copyright term increases for the analysed context.

As a curiosity, the work Peter Pan, or The Boy Who Wouldn't Grow Up is subject in the UK to a special clause in the Copyright Designs and Patents Act 1988 that granted Great Ormond Street Hospital a right to royalty in perpetuity. J. M. Barrie had gifted the copyright to the work to the hospital in 1929. The different copyright terms in the various jurisdictions has led to some disputes involving derivative works created and/or sold elsewhere in the world.

== Charts ==
Several charts have been made to help decipher the various copyright terms in the United States, such as:

- Tom W. Bell's Trend of Maximum U.S. General Copyright Term (July 23, 2008)
- Clorox (diskussion)'s Vectorization of Tom Bell's graph, depicted above, which shows expansion of U.S. copyright law (November 27, 2008)
- Peter B. Hirtle's Copyright Term and the Public Domain in the United States (2015)
- Sunstein, Kann, Murphy & Timbers, LLP's Copyright Flowchart (2014)

== See also ==
- History of copyright law
- List of copyright duration by country
- Perpetual copyright
- Rule of the shorter term
- Copyright Duration Directive
- Copyright Term Extension Act
