= Generalstabens Topografiske Afdeling =

Logo

Generalstabens Topografiske Afdeling (English: the General staff topographic department) was the cartographic, topographic and general maps department of the Danish army from 1842 to 1928. It supplied both government and civilian organizations with accurate maps of Denmark.

== History ==
Generalkvartermesterstaben was a department under the newly erected Generalstab of 1808, the first combined army command in Denmark. The Generalstab is the origin of Army Operational Command.

On 8 April 1842 Generalkvartermesterstaben and the mapping part of the scientific organisation Det Kongelig Danske Videnskabernes Selskab was merged into Generalstabens Topografiske Afdeling. For a short period, 1856-1864, the department was under the Ministry of Trade, other than that, it was under the Ministry of War for the entire span of its life.

By law number 82, of 31 March 1928, it was merged with Den danske Gradmaaling, two institutions that did somewhat overlapping cartographic and topographic mapping of Denmark, to form Geodætisk Institut.

According to a resolution of 1831, the copyright on topographic maps produced by the Generalkvartermesterstaben or the Generalstabens Topografiske Afdeling never expires. This order is still valid according to the Danish copyright law (Ophavsretslovens §92).
