= Opcode Systems =

American music software company

Opcode Systems, Inc.
- Industry: Software Development
- Founded: 1985; 41 years ago in Palo Alto, California, United States
- Founder: Dave Oppenheim
- Defunct: 1998
- Fate: Acquired by Gibson Guitar Corporation
- Products: Vision (a MIDI-only sequencer); Studio Vision (a full sequencer, including digital audio); Galaxy (a patch editor and librarian); OMS (a MIDI-interface environment); Max (a graphical development environment); Overture (music notation and hybrid DAW software, now published by Sonic Scores)

Opcode Systems, Inc. was an American music software company founded in 1985 by Dave Oppenheim and based in and around Palo Alto, California, USA. Opcode produced MIDI sequencing software for the classic Mac OS and Microsoft Windows, which would later include digital audio workstation capabilities, as well as audio and MIDI hardware interfaces. Opcode's MIDIMAC sequencer, launched in 1986, was one of the first commercially available MIDI sequencers for the Macintosh. In 1998, the company was acquired by Gibson Guitar Corporation, who ceased further development of Opcode products the following year.

== History ==
In 1985, Stanford University graduate Dave Oppenheim founded Opcode. Oppenheim, the majority partner, focused on Research & Development, with Gary Briber, the minority partner, focusing on Sales & Marketing. Paul J. de Benedictis, after meeting Ray Spears in San Francisco while he was printing the beta manual for MIDIMAC Sequencer v1.0, joined the company to write product manuals, test products and demo the products. The company introduced its products at the 1985 Summer NAMM Show in New Orleans (June 22–25) (after which Apple, Inc. objected to the MIDIMAC name). According to composer Laurie Spiegel, the products were publicly available in July.

In 1986, two major products were released. One was the MIDIMAC Sequencer, which later became the Opcode Sequencer and, eventually, Vision. The other was the MIDIMAC interface for the Macintosh computer. These products allowed musicians to use the Macintosh platform for music sequencing and were utilized by electronic music pioneers such as Herbie Hancock, Wendy Carlos, Thomas Dolby, and others.

In 1986, music software programmer David Zicarelli licensed his Editor/Librarian for the Yamaha DX-7 to Opcode, which published this product. At its peak, Opcode would market over ten separate Editor/Librarians, software programs designed to facilitate the editing of sound patches for synthesizers and the storage and organization of those patches on a personal computer.

In 1987, Gary Briber sold his portion of the company to Chris Halaby, with Halaby assuming the position of Chief Executive Officer, and Sales & Marketing responsibilities falling upon Keith Borman and de Benedictis, respectively. De Benedictis was also the product manager for many of the products, including the new version of Opcode's sequencer, Vision.

In 1989, Opcode introduced Vision, its award-winning sequencing platform for the Macintosh (and, eventually, Windows). A simplified version, EZ Vision, was soon released. EZ Vision's successor, MusicShop, included a simple notation view - a first in a sequencing product in that price range (roughly $100 US).

The same year, Opcode licensed the computer music authoring system Max from IRCAM, where it had been developed academically by Miller Puckette. Opcode began selling a commercial version of the program in 1990, developed and extended by Zicarelli. Never a perfect fit for Opcode Systems, active development on the software ceased in the mid-90s before Zicarelli acquired Max's publishing rights and founded Cycling '74 in 1997 to continue the commercial development and distribution of Max.

In 1990, Opcode introduced Studio Vision (initially called 'Audio Vision'), which added digital audio recording (using Digidesign's digital audio hardware) to Vision's sequencing and editing platform. Studio Vision was the first-ever commercially available product integrating MIDI sequencing and digital audio editing and recording on a personal computer. Paul J. de Benedictis was the Studio Vision product manager and helped come up with the idea of audio and MIDI in the same product after speaking with Mark Jeffery, a Digidesign employee key to their software development. A version called VisionDSP was released just before the company folded. Caitlin Johnson (currently Caitlin Bini) was Opcode's Senior Tech Writer, and she wrote the Studio Vision, Vision, EZ Vision, and Galaxy user manuals.

In July 1995, Opcode acquired Music Quest, Inc., makers of MPU-401-compatible expansion cards and peripheral boxes, such as the PC MIDI Card, the MQX-16s, the MQX-32m, and the MIDIEngine. Opcode continued to sell Music Quest's hardware following the acquisition. Opcode's hardware products also included a line of serial MIDI interfaces which included the Studio 3, Studio 4, Studio 5, Studio 64X and 128X, as well as USB interfaces including the DATport, SONICport, MIDIport and STUDIOport lines.

In 1998, Opcode was bought by Gibson Guitar Corporation. Development on Opcode products ceased in 1999.
