= Jisc =

British IT service provider for educational institutions

- Formation: 1 April 1993
- Type: Not-for-profit
- Purpose: To enable people in higher education, further education and skills in the UK to perform at the forefront of international practice by exploiting fully the possibilities of modern digital empowerment, content and connectivity
- Headquarters: Bristol
- Location(s): Bristol, London, Manchester, and Oxford
- CEO: Heidi Fraser-Krauss
- Website: www.jisc.ac.uk
- Formerly called: Joint Information Systems Committee (JISC)

Jisc is a United Kingdom not-for-profit organisation that provides network and IT services and digital resources in support of further and higher education and research, as well as the public sector. Its head office is based in Bristol with offices in London, Manchester, and Oxford. Its current CEO is Heidi Fraser-Krauss, who joined in September 2021 from the University of Sheffield.

== History ==
The Joint Information Systems Committee (JISC) was established on 1 April 1993 under the terms of letters of guidance from the Secretaries of State to the newly established Higher Education Funding Councils for England, Scotland and Wales, inviting them to establish a Joint Committee to deal with networking and specialist information services. JISC was to provide national vision and leadership for the benefit of the entire Higher Education sector. The organisation inherited the functions of the Information Systems Committee (ISC) and the Computer Board, both of which had served universities. An initial challenge was to support a much larger community of institutions, including ex-polytechnics and higher education colleges. The new committee was initially supported by four sub-committees, covering Networking; Awareness, Liaison and Training; Electronic Information; and Technology Applications.

In 1995, the Northern Ireland Department of Education became a full partner in JISC. The organisation expanded again in 1999 when the further education funding bodies became funding partners. This expansion prompted a restructuring and a new set of committees:

- JISC Committee for Authentication and Security (JCAS) November 1999 – January 2002. The work of this committee was taken over by JCN2 and JCIE3.
- JISC Committee for Electronic Information (JCEI) November 1999 – January 2002. The work of this committee was taken over by JCIE3 and JCCS4.
- JISC Committee for Integrated Environments for Learners (JCIEL) November 1999 – January 2002. The work of this committee was taken over by JCLT5.
- JISC Committee for Awareness, Liaison and Training (JCALT) The work of this committee was taken over by JOS6.
- JISC Committee on Networking (JCN2).

The expansion also raised wider concerns about JISC's governance, and Sir Brian Follett was appointed to carry out an independent inquiry. His report, published in November 2000, concluded that "JISC is perceived as a UK success story, providing a network of world-class standard and a range of excellent services. Importantly, it evolves continuously and is an excellent example of collaboration between the community and the funding bodies". However, Follett made various recommendations for reform, most of which were accepted by the funding bodies.

A new structure was therefore put in place from December 2001, consisting of a JISC Board, advised by a steering committee made up of senior officers from each funding body. Six sub-committees fell under two main heads: strategy and policy committees, which aimed to ensure that the needs of specific communities were met (in the fields of research, learning and teaching, and management); and functional committees, concentrating on specific areas of work (networking, information environment, and content acquisition).

In January 2005, the Freedom of Information Act 2000 came into full effect, giving the public a general right to access all types of recorded information held by public bodies. JISC took an important lead in raising the Act's profile in the academic community and published its own FOI Publication Scheme.

In the spring of 2005, the Learning and Skills Council (LSC) announced a reduction in its funding contribution to JISC. The LSC and JISC Executive negotiated a package of services that the LSC would continue to contribute towards in the future.

Also in 2005, a number of strategies and policies for UK Higher and Further Education were published, reaffirming the importance of ICT: JISC was seen as taking an important role in supporting and implementing these strategies.

In the same year, JISC signed agreements with several international partners:

- SURF Foundation in the Netherlands, cementing the considerable areas of co-operation between the two organisations;
- Australian Department for Education, Science and Training (DEST) supporting the e-Framework initiative which aims to develop a service-oriented approach to the development and integration of IT systems;
- Deutsche Forschungsgemeinschaft (Germany), Denmark's Electronic Research Library (DEFF) and SURF to create the Knowledge exchange which aims to increase the return on investment by the individual organisations in ICT infrastructure, services and projects.

Under the Government Spending Review 2004, JISC was awarded additional funding of £81 million for the period April 2006 to March 2009, and was able to launch a range of new programmes to support the work of the higher education and research community. Funding for SuperJANET5 was provided by all of its funding partners. Other activities were funded by the Higher Education Funding Councils for England and Wales.

In 2009 JISC published the In From The Cold: An assessment of the scope of "Orphan Works" and its impact on the delivery of services to the public. JISC stated this project had four goals:

- To define the impact of orphan works on public sector service delivery
- Research the scale and scope of the problem across the Strategic Content Alliance communities
- Provide qualitative evidence of how access to and use of content are inhibited
- Raise the profile of the issue through strategic advocacy and press relations

A review of JISC's work, commissioned by the Higher Education Funding Council for England under the chairmanship of Sir Alan Wilson, was published in February 2011. One of the principal findings of the review was that there is no comparable body to JISC within the UK, and internationally its reputation is outstanding as a strategic leader and partner. The Review concluded that "JISC is an invaluable national resource which has evolved in response to increasing demands over 20 years". However, the Review also recommended that, due to the breadth and complexity of JISC's activity, its structure, processes, projects, programmes and governance need to be simplified and reshaped: "[i]n an era of financial constraint, it is necessary to refocus activities around clearer priorities, and to ensure JISC operates with a sustainable financial model".

In 2012 JISC became an independent not-for-profit charity funded mainly by the government and universities. At this point it renamed itself Jisc.

A cut in funding by the Department for Education in 2018 meant that Jisc had to start charging further education colleges a subscription for services.

In 2019 Jisc merged with Eduserv, another charity promoting IT in the public sector and in charities. The combined entity continues to be named Jisc, and is based at Eduserv's Bristol headquarters.

In 2020 Jisc merged with HECSU, a careers information and advice service.

In 2022 Jisc merged with HESA, the agency responsible for collection, analysis and dissemination of quantitative information about higher education in the United Kingdom.

In September 2022, Jisc agreed to a closer working relationship with UCISA.

In August 2024, Jisc announced that it would cease all activity on each of its X accounts. Jisc explained that the move was taken due to "recent events that are incompatible with our values as an organisation". Jisc announced that it would keep its profiles on X to prevent any misuse of its identity but would not post any new content after 21 August 2024.

== Services ==
Services offered by Jisc include:

- Providing UK universities and colleges with shared digital infrastructure and services, such as the JANET network
- Operating shared digital infrastructure and services, including:

- Archives Hub (a catalogue of the collections of academic and other institutions)
- Library Hub
- eduroam UK (wireless access across different institutions)
- Learner Analytics and authentication systems (Open Athens and the UK Federation)
- Sherpa (tools for checking permissions around Open Access)

- Negotiating sector-wide deals, such as the Jisc Collections licenses for academic journals as well as deals with IT vendors, commercial publishers and aggregators of e-content.
- Advice on digital technology for education and research.
- Providing cyber security products and services.

Jisc acts as a national consortium for the UK academic community.

The National Academic Mailing List Service, known as JiscMail, was, as of 2017, the UK's biggest educational and research email discussion list community. JiscMail is part of Jisc. JiscMail hosts over 9000 educational and research email mailing lists and in 2015 had over 1,500,000 unique subscribers. JiscMail uses LISTSERV mailing list software. JiscMail helps groups of individuals to communicate and discuss education/research interests using email discussion lists. JiscMail Helpline are the team who provide information, advice, support and help to users of the service, from setting up new lists, to helping customers find lists, join lists, update their details. JiscMail became the National Mailing List Service as the successor to a previous service, Mailbase, in November 2000.

Services previously offered by Jisc include:

- The Plagiarism Advisory Service, also known as JISCPAS, offered advice on plagiarism to higher education institutions.
- A public mirror service (mirror.ac.uk) primarily focused on free software, operating between 1999 and July 2007.
- ZETOC, a service providing access to the British Library's table of contents, including more than 30,000 journals and 52 million articles and conferences papers, which was provided by JISC free of charge to members of JISC-sponsored UK further or higher education establishments and UK research councils. The ZETOC service was withdrawn with effect from 1 August 2022 after a review found "a progressive decline in its use and a diminishing number of users".
