= Government edicts doctrine =

United States legal doctrine that edicts of government are not copyrightable

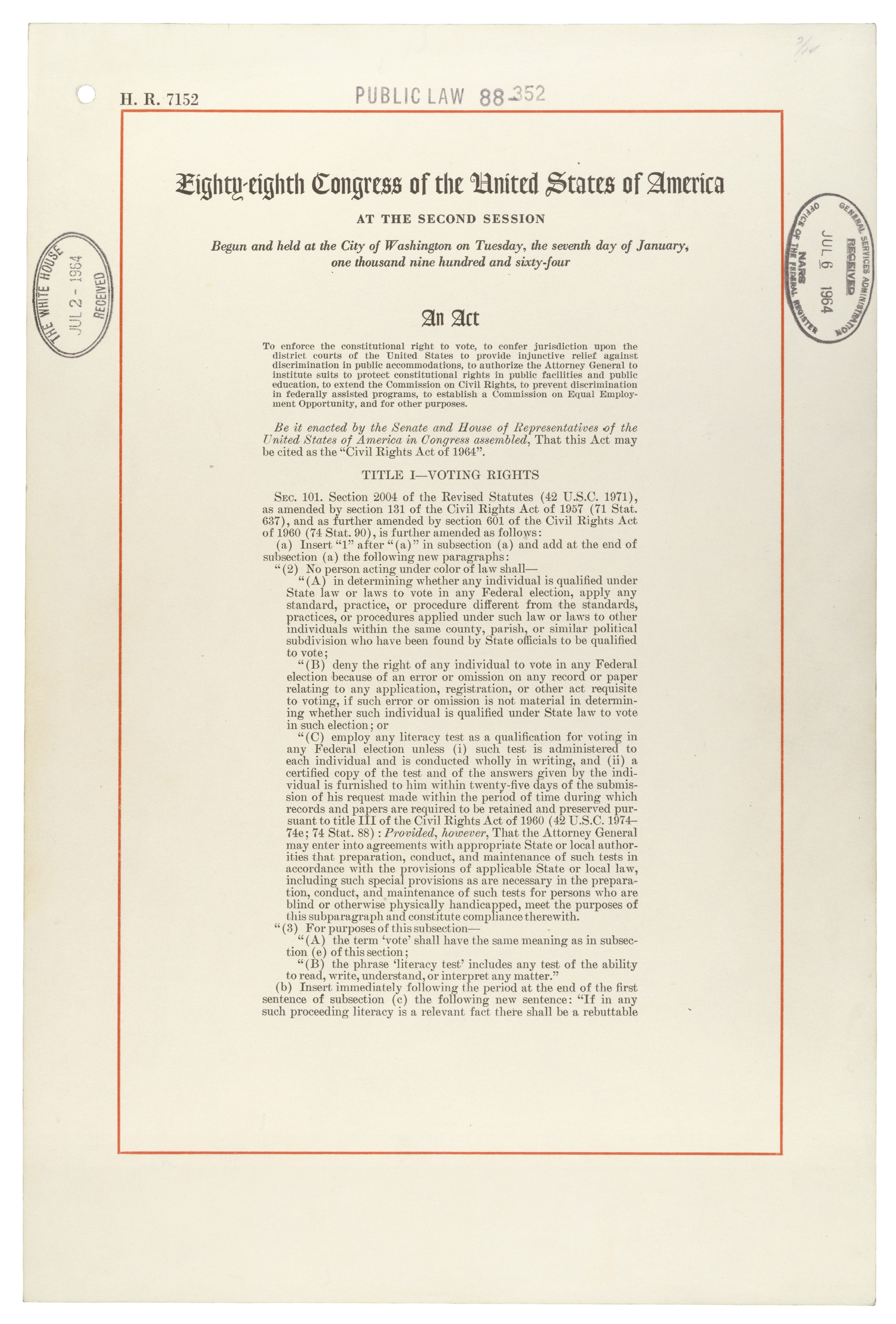
First page of the Civil Rights Act of 1964

The government edicts doctrine is a principle in United States copyright law. Edict of government is a technical term associated with the United States Copyright Office's guidelines and practices that comprehensively includes laws (in a wide sense of that term), which advises that such submissions will neither be accepted nor processed for copyright registration. It is based on the principle of public policy that citizens must have unrestrained access to the laws that govern them. Similar provisions occur in most, but not all, systems of copyright law; the main exceptions are in those copyright laws which have developed from English law, under which the copyright in laws rests with the Crown or the government.

The concept of an "edict of government" is distinct from that of a work of the United States government, although a given work may fall into both categories (e.g., an act of Congress). The impossibility of enforcing copyright over edicts of government arises from common law, starting with the case of Wheaton v. Peters (1834), while the ineligibility of U.S. government works for copyright has its basis in statute law, starting with the Printing Act of 1895.

In the UK, the right of the government to prevent printing of the law was established by at least 1820, and formalized by the Copyright Act 1911 (1 & 2 Geo. 5. c. 46).

== Definition ==
A definition of an edict of government is given by the United States Copyright Office:

Edicts of government, such as judicial opinions, administrative rulings, legislative enactments, public ordinances, and similar official legal documents are not copyrightable for reasons of public policy. This applies to such works whether they are Federal, State, or local as well as to those of foreign governments.

== Basis in public policy ==
The idea that edicts of government cannot be copyrighted in the United States dates to the decision of the Supreme Court in Wheaton v. Peters, 33 U.S. (Pet. 8) 591 (1834). That case concerned the question of copyright in the official reports of cases before the Supreme Court itself, and is best known for refusing the idea of a common law copyright in published works; however, the last sentence of the opinion of the court reads "It may be proper to remark that the court are unanimously of opinion, that no reporter has or can have any copyright in the written opinions delivered by this court; and that the judges thereof cannot confer on any reporter any such right."

In the same case it was argued – and accepted by the Court – that "it would be absurd, for a legislature to claim the copyright; and no one else can do it, for they are the authors, and cause them to be published without copyright … Statutes were never copyrighted." Further, "it is the bounden duty of government to promulgate its statutes in print". "[A]ll countries ... subject to the sovereignty of the laws" hold the promulgation of the laws, from whatever source, "as essential as their existence." "If either statutes or decisions could be made private property, it would be in the power of an individual to shut out the light by which we guide our actions." (Wheaton v. Peters, 33 US (8 Pet) 591, 668 (1834))

This doctrine was developed in a number of cases through the nineteenth century, particularly with regards to the opinions of State courts. Several States attempted to sell the exclusive right to report court proceedings to fund the publication of law reports, but these attempts were struck down by the federal courts. One such case was Banks & Bros. v. West Publishing Co., 27 F. 50 (C.C.D. Minn. 1886), concerning the right to report opinions of the Iowa Supreme Court in the face of an Iowa statute granting exclusive rights to the plaintiff. In finding in favor of the defendant, the circuit court opined:

[I]t is a maxim of universal application that every man is presumed to know the law, and it would seem inherent that freedom of access to the laws, or the official interpretation of those laws, should be co-extensive with the sweep of the maxim. Knowledge is the only just condition of obedience. The laws of Rome were written on tablets and posted, that all might read, and all were bound to obedience. The act of that emperor who caused his enactments to be written in small letters, on small tablets, and then posted the latter at such height that none could read the letters, and at the same time insisted upon the rule of obedience, outraging as it did the relations of governor and governed under his own system of government, has never been deemed consistent with or possible under ours.

The Supreme Court confirmed such opinions in Banks v. Manchester, 128 U.S. 244 (1888), concerning reports of the Supreme Court of Ohio, and in Callaghan v. Myers, 128 U.S. 617 (1888), concerning reports of the Supreme Court of Illinois. Similar cases have disbarred the pretended copyright of State constitutions and statutes: Davidson v. Wheelock, 27 F. 61 (C.C.D.Minn. 1866), concerning the constitution and statutes of Minnesota; Howell v. Miller, 91 F. 129 (6th Cir. 1898), concerning the statutes of Michigan; and more recently in State of Georgia v. The Harrison Company, 548 F. Supp. 110 (N.D.Ga. 1982), concerning the statutes of Georgia. In Building Officials & Code Adm. v. Code Technology, Inc., 628 F.2d 730 (1st Cir. 1980), the principal was applied to the Massachusetts building code.

In April 2008, Oregon asked Justia to remove copies of the Oregon code from its website, citing that the particular publication of the law, as distinguished by features like introductory paragraphs and page numbers, was copyrighted. Following negative media attention, the state issued a special waiver promising not to enforce the copyright against Justia or Public.Resource.org, but did not change its policies regarding the accessibility of its laws to others.

In April 2020, the Supreme Court found in Georgia v. Public.Resource.Org, Inc. that the Official Code of Georgia Annotated was not eligible for copyright.

In a submission to the United States Senate, the U.S. Copyright Office summarized the public policy grounds as follows:

such material as the laws and governmental rules and decisions must be freely available to the public and made known as widely as possible; hence there must be no restriction on the reproduction and dissemination of such documents.

== Governments adopting copyrighted works as legal standards ==
An interesting situation arises when a governing body adopts copyrighted works to serve as legal standards. For example, in Veeck v. Southern Building Code Congress Int'l, 293 F.3d 791 (5th Cir. 2002), the court determined that once the copyrighted model building codes of the plaintiff had been adopted into law by a municipality, its copyright protections were outweighed by the policies favoring unfettered access by members of the public to republish the laws in any manner they see fit. However, Veeck recognized a distinction between verbatim recitations of copyrighted materials in the law itself, as opposed to mere references in the law which point to copyrighted materials. For example, the 9th Circuit Court of Appeals held that a law that instructs physicians to adopt copyrighted standards developed by the American Medical Association to assign codes to medical procedures does not place the copyrighted work in the public domain. Practice Management Info. Corp. v. American Medical Ass'n, 121 F.3d 516 (9th Cir. 1997), opinion amended by 133 F.3d 1140 (9th Cir. 1998).

The Colorado Revised Statutes (C.R.S.) are the codified statutory law of Colorado. The Colorado General Assembly has claimed copyright protection of the C.R.S. under the aegis of the Committee on Legal Services since 1970. The assertion has been called "one of the most aggressive state government uses of copyright". Beginning in 1989, West Publishing began its own distribution, challenging the copyright claim was an impermissible copyright of the public domain and was unconstitutional as a violation of due process, freedom of speech, and prior restraint prohibitions. West settled with the state after the law was changed in 1990 to allow access to the legislative database for a very large fee. As of August 2013, the statutory database can be purchased with the annotations or editorial notes for $6,000 per year, or for $2,000 per year without the annotations or editorial notes. However, the requirement to purchase the database was eliminated in April, 2016. The only requirement is to file a request for the database and explaining which parts that the user wants.

Use of the Bluebook, a style guide for legal citations, is mandated by many U.S. federal courts. Its publisher, the Harvard Law Review, has asserted it to be a copyrighted work due to its inclusion of "carefully curated examples, explanations and other textual materials". New York University professor Christopher Jon Sprigman is a notable critic of this position; he has argued that the Bluebook was effectively public domain as an edict of government due to its adoption. After discovering that the copyright of the 10th edition (published 1958) had not been renewed, and that this edition was nearly identical to the most recent release, Sprigman started the Baby Blue project to create a public domain substitute to the Bluebook that was adapted from the text of the 1958 edition.

== Royal prerogative under English law ==
The position under English law is radically different from that developed by the United States courts. As documented by Chitty in his 1820 Treatise on the Law of the Prerogatives of the Crown, the monarch is considered to have a monopoly on the publication of laws:

As executive magistrate, […] the King has the right of promulgating to the people all acts of state and government. This gives the King the exclusive privilege of printing, at his own press, or at that of his grantees, all Acts of Parliament, proclamations, and orders of council.

The prerogative was placed on a statutory footing with the Copyright Act 1911 (1 & 2 Geo. 5. c. 46), which instituted the system of Crown copyright for work "prepared or published by or under the direction or control of His Majesty or any Government department". As the 1911 Act was the basis for copyright law throughout the British Empire – not merely in the United Kingdom – it has influenced the laws of the many countries that resulted after decolonization.

== Copyright in government works around the world ==
Australia
Section 182A of the Copyright Act 1968 provides that Crown copyright (including any prerogative right or privilege of the Crown in the nature of copyright) in certain "prescribed works" is not breached by making single copies, provided that these copies are not sold for profit (that is, for a price higher than the costs of copying). "Prescribed works" include federal and State laws and regulations and the judgements and opinions of federal and State courts.
Canada
Since 1997, the Reproduction of Federal Law Order allows the reproduction of federal laws and the judgements of federal courts, noting that "it is of fundamental importance to a democratic society that its law be widely known and that its citizens have unimpeded access to that law". The Order requires due diligence to be exercised in ensuring the accuracy of the materials reproduced; the reproduction cannot be represented as an official version.
New Zealand
Since 2001, a wide range of edicts of government have been exempted from Crown copyright in New Zealand by section 27 of the Copyright Act 1994. As well as Acts of Parliament, regulations and court judgments, the section 27 exemptions include the proceedings of Parliament (Hansard) and the reports of Royal commissions and other inquiries.
South Africa
South Africa formerly followed British copyright law, but the Copyright Act, 1978 introduced a provision that places "official texts of a legislative, administrative or legal nature", and official translations of such texts, in the public domain.

United Kingdom
Acts (of the Westminster Parliament and of the devolved Parliaments and Assemblies) and Measures (of the General Synod of the Church of England and of the Welsh Assembly) are protected by Crown copyright under section 164 of the Copyright, Designs and Patents Act 1988 (CDPA); secondary legislation and court judgements are also protected by the general regime of Crown copyright (s. 163, CDPA). The policy of the UK government in licensing reproductions is described in the 1999 white paper "Future Management of Crown Copyright", which justifies the continued existence of Crown copyright "to prevent misuse and to preserve the integrity of Crown material". Primary and secondary legislation may be freely reproduced for non-commercial use: this only applies to the original versions of legislation, not to the consolidated versions published as Statutes in Force and on the UK Statute Law Database. Commercial republishers are required to "add value" to the material, for example by collecting related legislation in a single volume. There is no general licence for republishing court judgements: the white paper is silent on the specific reasons for this omission, although it notes that there are "certain categories of Crown copyright protected material" that contain information of "a personal or confidential nature".

== See also ==
- Accessibility of United States state law
- Copyright of official texts
- Free Law Project, a nonprofit which seeks to expand access to American case law
- Public.Resource.Org, a nonprofit which has been involved in litigation on American edict of government issues
