= Copyright law of the United States =

In the United States, copyright grants monopoly protection for "original works of authorship". With the stated purpose to promote art and culture, copyright law assigns a set of exclusive rights to authors: to make and sell copies of their works, to create derivative works, and to perform or display their works publicly. These exclusive rights are subject to a time and generally expire 70 years after the author's death or 95 years after publication. In the United States, works published before January 1, 1931 are in the public domain.

United States copyright law was last generally revised by the Copyright Act of 1976, codified in Title 17 of the United States Code. The United States Constitution explicitly grants Congress the power to create copyright law (and patent law) under Article I, Section 8, Clause 8, known as the Copyright Clause. Under the Copyright Clause, Congress has the power "To promote the Progress of Science and useful Arts, by securing for limited Times to Authors and Inventors the exclusive Right to their respective Writings and Discoveries."

The United States Copyright Office, which is in the Library of Congress, handles copyright registration, recording of copyright transfers, and other administrative aspects of copyright law.

== History ==
United States copyright law traces its lineage back to the British Statute of Anne, which influenced the first U.S. federal copyright law, the Copyright Act of 1790. The length of copyright established by the Founding Fathers was 14 years with an option to renew it once for 14 more. The Copyright Act of 1831 changed the length of the initial term to 28 years.

Through the Copyright Act of 1976, copyright duration was extended to the life of the author plus 50 years or 75 years after publication for works made for hire. The Sonny Bono Copyright Term Extension Act of 1998 (also called the "Mickey Mouse Protection Act", because it prevented the copyright from expiring on the Disney cartoon character Mickey Mouse) further increased the term length to the life of the author plus 70 years or 95 years after publication (or 120 years after creation, whichever is shorter) for works made for hire.

== Purpose of copyright ==
The Congress shall have Power ... To promote the Progress of Science and useful Arts, by securing for limited Times to Authors and Inventors the exclusive Right to their respective Writings and Discoveries.

— United States Constitution, Article I, Section 8, Clause 8

The goal of copyright law, as set forth in the Copyright Clause of the U.S. Constitution, is "to promote the Progress of Science and useful Arts, by securing for limited Times to Authors and Inventors the exclusive Right to their respective Writings and Discoveries." This includes incentivizing the creation of art, literature, architecture, music, and other works of authorship. As with many legal doctrines, the effectiveness of copyright law in achieving its stated purpose is a matter of debate.

== Works subject to copyright law ==
The United States copyright law protects "original works of authorship" fixed in a tangible medium of expression, including literary, dramatic, musical, artistic, and other intellectual works. This protection is available to both published and unpublished works. Copyright law includes the following types of works:

- Literary
- Musical
- Dramatic
- Pantomimes and choreographic works
- Pictorial, graphic, and sculptural works
- Audiovisual works
- Sound recordings
- Derivative works
- Compilations
- Architectural works

=== Idea–expression dichotomy ===
Copyright law protects the "expression" of an idea, but copyright does not protect the "idea" itself. This distinction is called the idea–expression dichotomy. The distinction between "idea" and "expression" is fundamental to copyright law. From the Copyright Act of 1976 (17 U.S.C. § 102):

In no case does copyright protection for an original work of authorship extend to any idea, procedure, process, system, method of operation, concept, principle, or discovery, regardless of the form in which it is described, explained, illustrated, or embodied in such work.

For example, a paper describing a political theory is copyrightable. The paper is the expression of the author's ideas about the political theory. The theory itself is just an idea, and is not copyrightable. Another author is free to describe the same theory in their own words without infringing on the original author's copyright.

Although fundamental, the idea–expression dichotomy is often difficult to put into practice. Reasonable people can disagree about where the unprotectable "idea" ends and the protectable "expression" begins. As Judge Learned Hand put it, "Obviously, no principle can be stated as to when an imitator has gone beyond copying the 'idea,' and has borrowed its 'expression.' Decisions must therefore inevitably be ad hoc."

=== Compilations of facts and the sweat of the brow doctrine ===
Mere facts are not copyrightable. However, compilations of facts are treated differently and may be copyrightable material. Section 103 of the Copyright Act allows copyright protection for compilations as long as there is some creative or original act involved in developing the compilation, such as in the selection (deciding which facts to include or exclude) and arrangement (how facts are displayed and in what order). Copyright protection in compilations is limited to the selection and arrangement of facts, not to the facts themselves.

The Supreme Court decision in Feist Publications, Inc., v. Rural Telephone Service Co. clarified the requirements for copyright in compilations. The Feist case denied copyright protection to a "white pages" phone book (a compilation of telephone numbers, listed alphabetically). In making this ruling, the Supreme Court rejected the "sweat of the brow" doctrine. That is, copyright protection requires creativity, and no amount of hard work ("sweat of the brow") can transform a non-creative list (like an alphabetical listing of phone numbers) into copyrightable subject matter. A mechanical, non-selective collection of facts (e.g., alphabetized phone numbers) cannot be protected by copyright.

=== Useful articles ===
Copyright protects artistic expression. Copyright does not protect useful articles, or objects with some useful functionality. The Copyright Act states:

A "useful article" is an article having an intrinsic utilitarian function that is not merely to portray the appearance of the article or to convey information. An article that is normally a part of a useful article is considered a "useful article".

"the design of a useful article, as defined in this section, shall be considered a pictorial, graphic, or sculptural work only if, and only to the extent that, such design incorporates pictorial, graphic, or sculptural features that can be identified separately from, and are capable of existing independently of, the utilitarian aspects of the article."

However, many industrial designers create works that are both artistic and functional. Under these circumstances, copyright law only protects the artistic expression of such a work, and only to the extent that the artistic expression can be separated from its utilitarian function.

In 2017, the US Supreme Court granted certiorari in the case Star Athletica, LLC v. Varsity Brands, Inc. to determine when a "pictorial, graphic, or sculptural feature" incorporated into a useful article is eligible for copyright protection, holding that such features are eligible for copyright protection "only if the feature (1) can be perceived as a two- or three-dimensional work of art separate from the useful article and (2) would qualify as a protectable pictorial, graphic, or sculptural work—either on its own or fixed in some other tangible medium of expression—if it were imagined separately from the useful article into which it is incorporated." Star Athletica began as a suit by Varsity Brands against Star Athletica for infringing the copyright of five cheerleader uniform designs. Applying its new test to the cheerleader uniform designs, the court said:

First, one can identify the decorations as features having pictorial, graphic, or sculptural qualities. Second, if the arrangement of colors, shapes, stripes, and chevrons on the surface of the cheerleading uniforms were separated from the uniform and applied in another medium—for example, on a painter's canvas—they would qualify as "two-dimensional ... works of ... art". And imaginatively removing the surface decorations from the uniforms and applying them in another medium would not replicate the uniform itself. Indeed, respondents have applied the designs in this case to other media of expression—different types of clothing—without replicating the uniform. The decorations are therefore separable from the uniforms and eligible for copyright protection.

This produces a relatively low threshold for pictorial, graphic, or sculptural features on useful articles to be eligible for copyright protection, which one commentator clearly highlighted: the Star Athletica decision "really has ensured that all but the subtlest graphic designs will be able to gain copyright protection...once we determine that the designs 'hav[e] ... graphic ... qualities ... [and could be] applied ... on a painter's canvas,' the test for copyrightability is met."

=== Works by the federal government ===
Works created by the federal government are not copyrightable. This restriction on copyright applies to publications produced by the United States Government, and its agents or employees within the scope of their employment. However, government contractors are generally not considered employees, and their works may be subject to copyright. Additionally, the government can purchase and hold the copyright to works created by third parties.

The government may restrict access to works it has produced through other mechanisms. For instance, classified materials may not be protected by copyright but are restricted by other applicable laws. Even in the case of non-classified materials, there may be specific prohibitions against usage, such as the presidential seal, which is restricted for commercial uses.

=== Federal and state laws are not restricted by copyright ===
Federal, state, and local statutes and court decisions are in the public domain and are ineligible for copyright, a concept known as the government edicts doctrine. A standard rationale was given in Georgia v. Harrison:

The citizens are the authors of the law, and therefore its owners, regardless of who actually drafts the provisions, because the law derives its authority from the consent of the public, expressed through the democratic process.

Three key Supreme Court cases established this government edicts doctrine: Wheaton v. Peters (1834), Banks v. Manchester (1888), and Callaghan v. Myers (1888). The doctrine was codified into the United States Code at 17 U.S.C. § 105 via the Copyright Act of 1976. The Copyright Office upholds this doctrine within its own regulations:

As a matter of longstanding public policy, the U.S. Copyright Office will not register a government edict that has been issued by any state, local, or territorial government, including legislative enactments, judicial decisions, administrative rulings, public ordinances, or similar types of official legal materials. Likewise, the Office will not register a government edict issued by any foreign government or any translation prepared by a government employee acting within the course of his or her official duties.

The Supreme Court has also ruled that annotated versions of statutes or court decisions at the federal, state, and local level, when such annotations are done by members of the government as part of their duties, are ineligible for copyright in Georgia v. Public.Resource.Org, Inc. (2020).

== Criteria for copyright ==
=== Originality ===
A simple circle is ineligible for copyright.

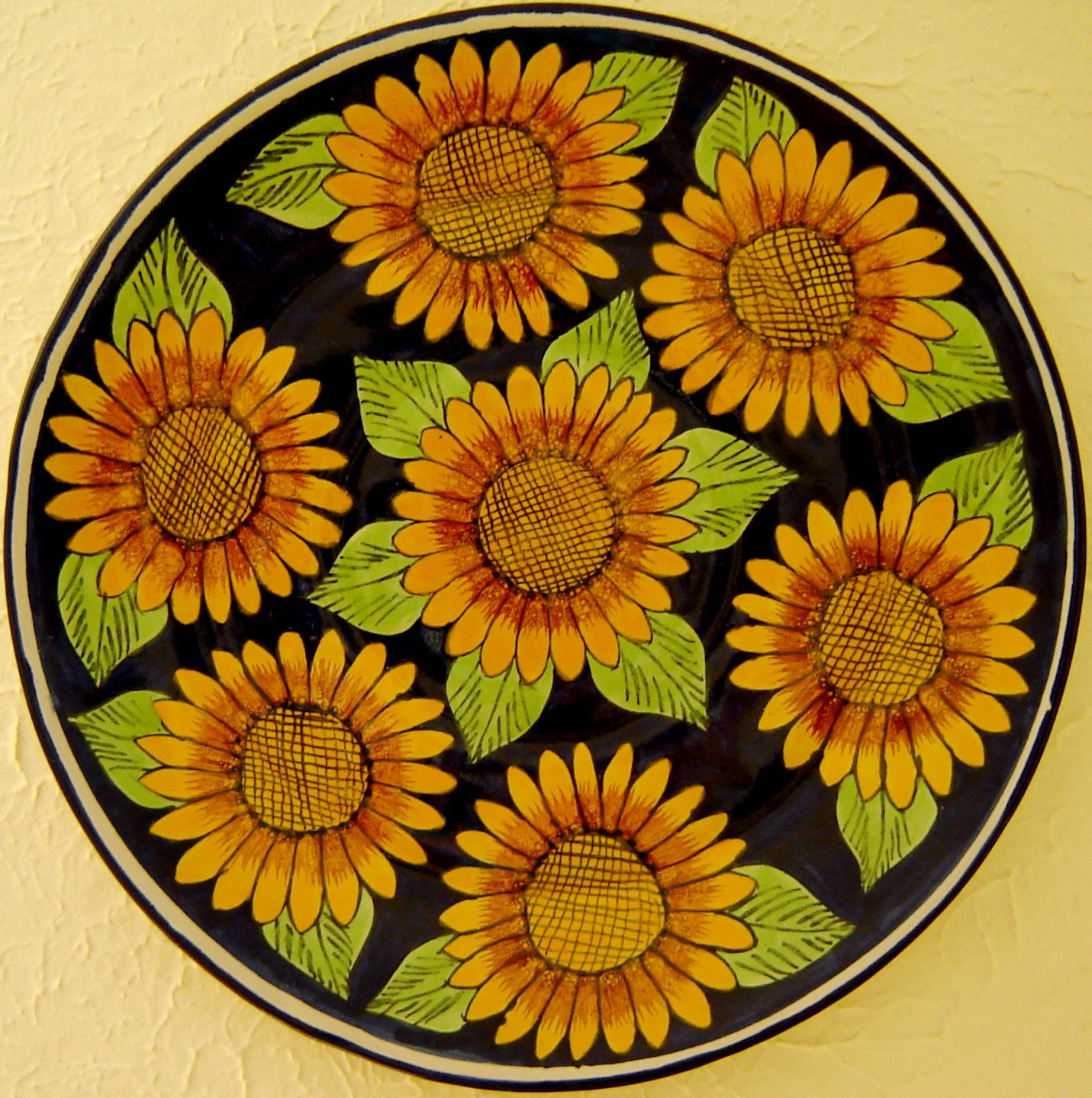
Although this image has a simple circle on the outside, it is eligible for copyright protection as it is original authorship from Andreanna Moya Photography and meets a “spark of creativity” as there are flowers as a decoration.

Originality in copyright law is when a work is "independently created by a human author" with a "minimal degree of creativity". Independent creation means that someone created it themselves without copying. Originality should not be confused with novelty as work that is identical to another is still considered original if it was created independently. The Supreme Court has said that, to be creative, a work must have a "spark" and "modicum" of creativity. There are things like simple shapes, common and familiar symbols, names, lettering or coloring of the work and mere listings of ingredients or contents that are not creative enough to be eligible for copyright.

=== Tangible medium ===
A work is fixed in a tangible medium when it is captured (either by or under the authority of an author) in a sufficiently permanent medium such that the work can be perceived, reproduced, or communicated for more than a short time. The work must be able to be communicated to others whether through visually, audio or tactile means directly or with an aid of a device and must be fixed in a physical medium. Examples of works fixed in a tangible medium are tactile art, compositions recorded or written, paintings, movies, and photographs. In contrast, someone singing a tune, speaking or broadcasting something live that hasn't been recorded will not be eligible for copyright as the work isn't fixed and not able to be reproduced or communicated in any way.

== Exclusive rights ==
There are six basic rights protected by copyright. The owner of a copyright has the exclusive right to do and authorize others to do the following:

- To reproduce the work in copies or phonorecords;
- To prepare derivative works based upon the work;
- To distribute copies or phonorecords of the work to the public by sale or other transfer of ownership, or by rental, lease, or lending;
- To publicly perform the work, in the case of literary, musical, dramatic, and choreographic works, pantomimes, and motion pictures and other audiovisual works;
- To publicly display the work, in the case of literary, musical, dramatic, and choreographic works, pantomimes, and pictorial, graphic, or sculptural works, including the individual images of a motion picture or other audiovisual work.
- To digitally transmit sound recordings by means of digital audio transmission.

A violation of any of the exclusive rights of the copyright holder is a copyright infringement, unless fair use (or a similar affirmative defense) applies.

=== Authorship, ownership, and work for hire ===
The initial owner of the copyright to a work is the author, unless that work is a "work made for hire".

If a work is made "for hire" within the meaning of the Copyright Act, then the employer or commissioning party is deemed to be the author and will own the copyright as though it were the true author. These circumstances under which a work may be found to be a work for hire are:

- Works prepared by an employee within the scope of their employment. In Community for Creative Non-Violence v. Reid, 490 U.S. 730 (1989), the Supreme Court held that the term "employee" in this context should be interpreted according to common law agency principles. If the person doing the work is an "employee" within the meaning of the common law, and the work was done within the scope of their employment (whether the work is the kind they were employed to prepare; whether the preparation takes place primarily within the employer's time and place specifications; and whether the work was activated, at least in part, by a purpose to serve the employer), then the work is a work for hire and the employer is the initial owner of the copyright.
- Specially ordered or commissioned works. Works created by independent contractors (rather than employees) can be deemed works for hire only if two conditions are satisfied. First, the work must fit into one of these categories: a contribution to a collective work, part of a motion picture or other audiovisual work, a translation, a supplementary work, a compilation, an instructional text, a test, answer material for a test, or an atlas. Second, the parties must expressly agree in a written, signed instrument that the work will be considered a work made for hire.

If a work is not a work for hire, then the author will be the initial copyright owner. The author generally is the person who conceives of the copyrightable expression and "fixes" it in a "tangible medium of expression". Special rules apply when multiple authors are involved:

- Joint authorship: US copyright law recognizes joint authorship in Section 101. The authors of a joint work are co-owners of a single copyright in the work. A joint work is "a work prepared by two or more authors with the intention that their contributions be merged into inseparable or independent parts of a unitary whole."
- Collective works: A collective work is a collection of independent, separately copyrightable works of authorship, such as a newspaper, magazine, or encyclopedia. In the absence of an express assignment of copyright, the author of each individual work in the collection retains copyright in that work. The compiler, or author of the collection, owns copyright in the expression he or she contributed, which is primarily the selection and arrangement of the separate contributions, but may include such things as a preface, advertisements, etc., that the collective author created.

=== Transfers and licenses ===
==== Background ====
Three types of transfers exist for copyrighted works:

- Assignment
- Exclusive license
- Non-exclusive license

The first two, assignment and exclusive licenses, require the transfer to be in writing. Nonexclusive licenses need not be in writing and they may be implied by the circumstances. Transfers of copyright always involve one or more of the exclusive rights of copyright. For instance, a license may provide a right to perform a work, but not to reproduce it or to prepare a derivative work (adaptation right).

The terms of the license are governed by the applicable contract law; however, there is substantial academic debate about to what extent the Copyright Act preempts state contract law principles.

An author, after transferring a copyright, can terminate the transfer under certain circumstances. This right to terminate the transfer is absolute and cannot be waived.

For works published before 1978, copyrights may revert to the author after 56 years. For example, Paul McCartney reclaimed the U.S. publishing rights to early Beatles songs from Sony Music Publishing, beginning in October 2018.

For works published since 1978, copyrights may revert to the original author after 35 years. 17 U.S.C. § 203(a) states that the author must write a letter requesting a termination of the original copyright grant at least two years before the effective termination date.

==== Recent history and works for hire ====
The transfer of copyright for works for hire cannot be terminated. In 1999, the Intellectual Property and Communications Omnibus Reform Act of 1999 was enacted, which included a provision that included sound recordings as works for hire, when they had not been previously. After criticism of the law from recording industry leaders, the Work Made for Hire and Copyright Corrections Act of 2000 was enacted, excluding sound recordings from being works for hire.

=== Limitations on exclusive rights ===
Title 17, United States Code, Section 108 places limitations on exclusive copyrights for the purposes of certain limited reproduction by a public library or an archive. Title 17, United States Code, Section 107 also places statutory limits on copyright which are commonly referred to as the fair use exception.

== Registration procedure ==
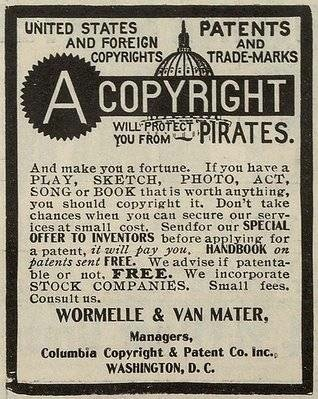
Late 19th-century newspaper advertisement for copyright registration services

Copyright is automatically granted to the author of an original work (that otherwise meets the basic copyright requirements, discussed above). Registration is not necessary. However, registration amplifies a copyright holder's rights in a number of ways. Registration, or refusal of registration, is required before a lawsuit can be filed, and registration creates the possibility for enhanced "statutory" damages.

A copyright can be registered online at the US Copyright Office's website. The Copyright Office reviews applications for obvious errors or lack of copyrightable subject matter and then issues a certificate of registration. The Copyright Office does not compare the author's new work against a collection of existing works or otherwise check for infringement.

=== Deposit requirement ===
The United States Copyright Office requires a deposit copy of the work for which copyright registration is sought. Deposits can be made through the Copyright Office's eCO System. This deposit requirement serves two purposes. First, if a copyright infringement lawsuit arises, the owner may prove that the material that is infringed is exactly the same material for which the owner has secured a registration. Second, this requirement helps the Library of Congress build its collection of works.

Failure to comply with the deposit requirement, as modified by Copyright Office regulations, is punishable by fine, but does not result in forfeiture of copyright.

=== Copyright notices ===
The use of copyright notices is optional. The Berne Convention, amending US copyright law in 1989, makes copyright automatic. However, the lack of notice of copyright using these marks may have consequences in terms of reduced damages in an infringement lawsuit—using notices of this form may reduce the likelihood of a defense of "innocent infringement" being successful.

== Duration of copyright ==
Expansion of U.S. copyright term (assuming authors create their works at age 35 and die at age 70)

Copyright protection generally lasts for 70 years after the death of the author. If the work was a "work for hire", then copyright persists for 120 years after creation or 95 years after publication, whichever is shorter. For works created before 1978, the copyright duration rules are complicated. However, works published before January 1, 1931 (other than sound recordings), have made their way into the public domain. All copyright terms run to the end of the calendar year in which they would otherwise expire.

=== Works created before 1978 ===
For works published or registered before 1978, the maximum copyright duration is 95 years from the date of publication, if copyright was renewed during the 28th year following publication. Copyright renewal has been automatic since the Copyright Renewal Act of 1992.

For works created before 1978, but not published or registered before 1978, the standard §302 copyright duration of 70 years from the author's death also applies. Prior to 1978, works had to be published or registered to receive copyright protection. Upon the effective date of the 1976 Copyright Act (which was January 1, 1978) this requirement was removed and these unpublished, unregistered works received protection. However, Congress intended to provide an incentive for these authors to publish their unpublished works. To provide that incentive, these works, if published before 2003, would not have their protection expire before 2048.

All copyrightable works published in the United States before 1931 except sound recordings are in the public domain; works created but not published or copyrighted before January 1, 1978, may be protected until 2047. For works that received their copyright before 1978, a renewal had to be filed in the work's 28th year with the Copyright Office for its term of protection to be extended. The need for renewal was eliminated by the Copyright Renewal Act of 1992, but works that had already entered the public domain by non-renewal did not regain copyright protection. Therefore, works published before 1964 that were not renewed are in the public domain.

Before 1972, sound recordings were not subject to federal copyright, but copying was nonetheless regulated under various state torts and statutes, some of which had no duration limit. The Sound Recording Amendment of 1971 extended federal copyright to recordings fixed on or after February 15, 1972, and declared that recordings fixed before that date would remain subject to state or common law copyright. Subsequent amendments had extended this latter provision until 2067. As a result, older sound recordings were not subject to the expiration rules that applied to contemporary visual works. Although these could have entered the public domain as a result of government authorship or formal grant by the owner, the practical effect was to render public domain audio virtually nonexistent.

This situation changed with the 2018 enactment of the Music Modernization Act, which extended federal copyright protection to all sound recordings, regardless of their date of creation, and preempted state copyright laws on those works. Under the Act, the first sound recordings to enter the public domain were those fixed before 1923, which entered the public domain on January 1, 2022. Recordings fixed between 1923 and February 14, 1972, will be phased into the public domain in the following decades. Specifically, works fixed 1923–1946 are public domain after 100 years and works fixed 1947–1956 after 110 years from the year of fixation. Works fixed between January 1, 1957, and February 14, 1972, will all become public domain on February 15, 2067.

In May 2016, Judge Percy Anderson ruled in a lawsuit between ABS Entertainment and CBS Radio that "remastered" versions of pre-1972 recordings can receive a federal copyright as a distinct work due to the amount of creative effort expressed in the process. The Ninth Circuit appeals court reversed the decision in favor of ABS Entertainment.

== Copyright limitations, exceptions, and defenses ==
United States copyright law includes numerous defenses, exceptions, and limitations. Some of the most important include:

- Copyright applies only to certain copyrightable subject matter, codified within 17 U.S.C. § 102. Works that are not "original works of authorship fixed in any tangible medium of expression" are not subject to copyright. 17 U.S.C. § 102(b) codifies that copyright protection does not extend to ideas, procedures, processes, systems, etc. Facts may not be copyrighted. "Useful articles" may not be copyrighted; this includes typeface designs (Eltra Corp. v. Ringer), fashion designs, blank forms, titles, names, short phrases, slogans, lists of ingredients and contents, domain names and band names.
- The first-sale doctrine, 17 U.S.C. § 109, limits the rights of copyright holders to control the further distribution and display of legally distributed copies of their works after the first sale by the copyright holder or other authorized sellers. The owner of a particular copy is entitled to "sell or otherwise dispose of the possession of that copy" and to "display the copy publicly ... to viewers present at the place where the copy is located."
- The "good faith" defense 17 U.S.C. § 504(c)(2)reduces statutory damages if the infringer is an educational institution, library, archive, or public broadcaster acting as part of its nonprofit activities and reasonably believed the use was “fair use”.
- The Copyright Act includes specific exemptions for types of works and particular entities, such as libraries or archives, public broadcasters, braille, software backup copies, "cover license" permitting sound recording covers, and jukebox compulsory licenses.
- A freedom of panorama clause, limited only to works of architecture, exists in 17 U.S.C. § 120(a).
- The Copyright Act, in 17 U.S.C. § 121and 17 U.S.C. § 110(8), includes specific statutory exceptions for reproduction of material for the blind or other persons with disabilities. Section 121 (the "Chafee Amendment") permits the reproduction of copyright works in Braille, audio, electronic, Web-Braille, or other necessary formats. For instance, the National Library Service for the Blind and Physically Handicapped (NLS) administers a program under Section 121, and the HathiTrust Digital Library also relies on Section 121 in providing access to disabled users.
- Section 512 ("OCILLA", passed as part of the DMCA in 1998) provides a contingent "safe harbor" for online service providers from secondary liability for their users' copy infringements.
- US copyright law does not allow works created by animals to be copyrighted.
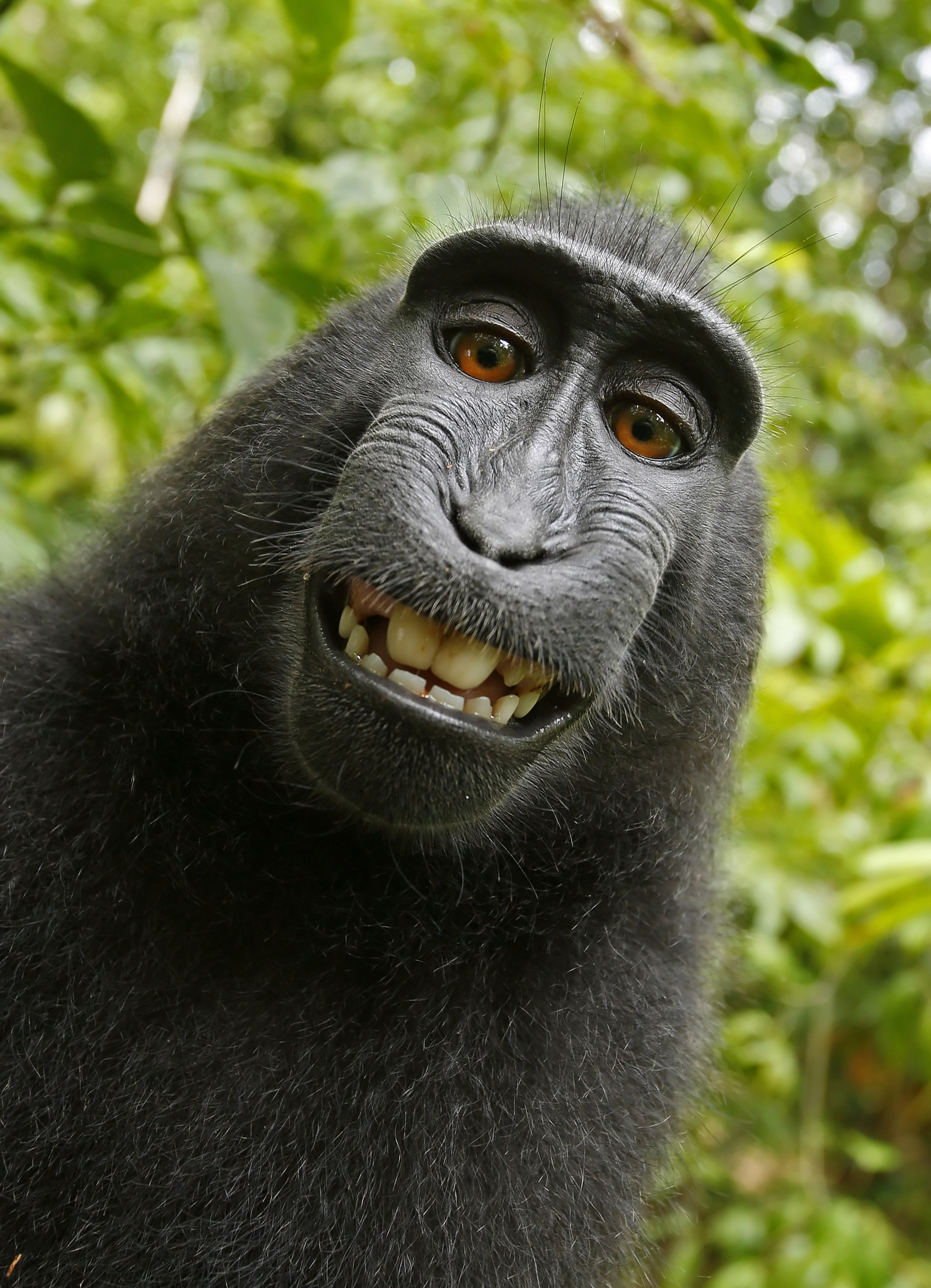
  As an animal-made photograph, this monkey selfie is ineligible for copyright in the United States.
- The United States Copyright Office and the DC District Court ruled that copyright does not apply to artificial intelligence–generated art.

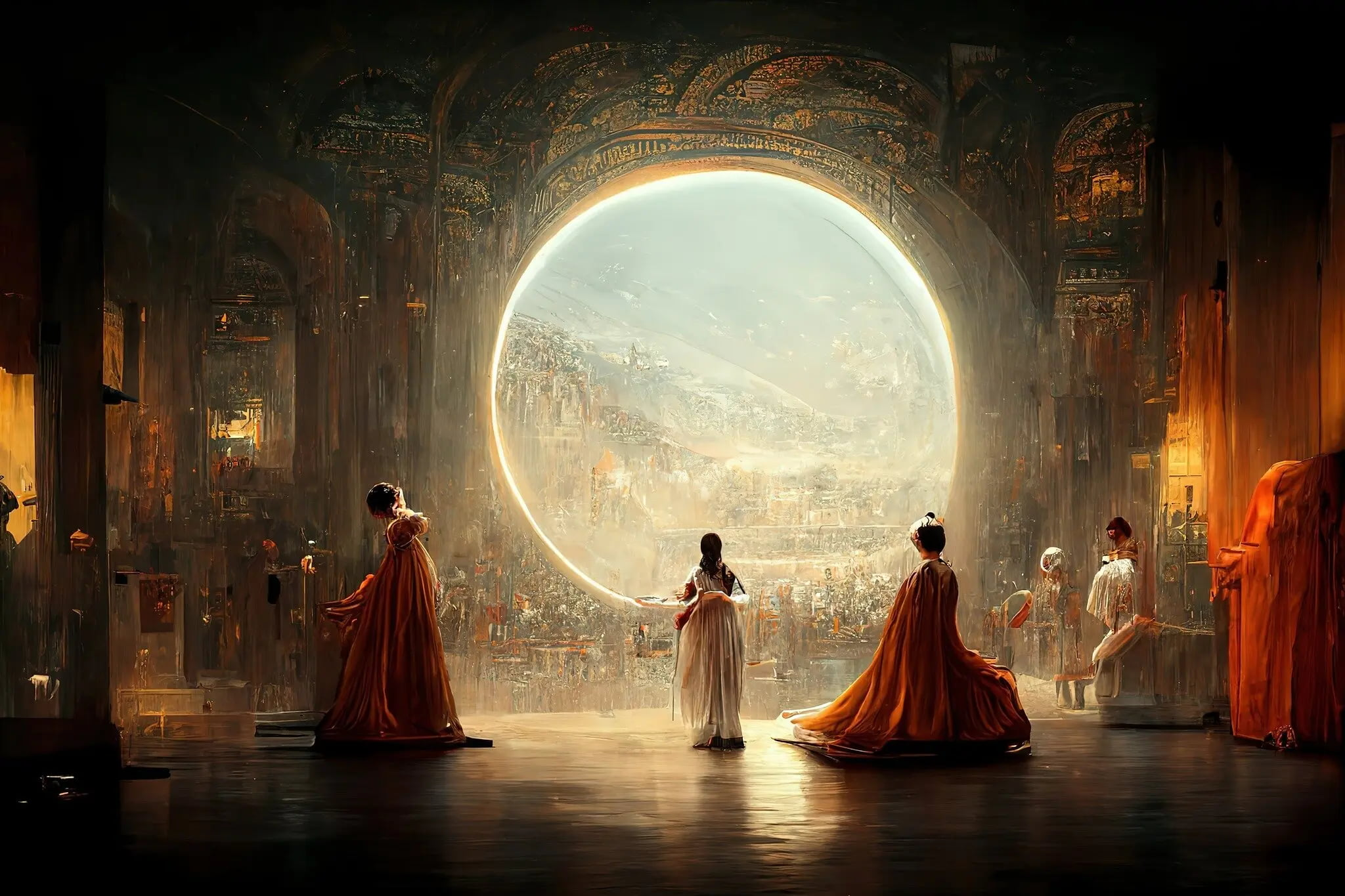
As AI art, this image is ineligible for copyright in the United States.

=== Fair use ===
Fair use is the use of limited amounts of copyrighted material in such a way as to not be an infringement. It is codified at 17 U.S.C. § 107, and states that "the fair use of a copyrighted work ... is not an infringement of copyright." The section lists four factors that must be assessed to determine whether a particular use is fair. There are no bright-line rules regarding fair use and each determination is made on an individualized case-by-case basis.

1. Purpose and character of the use, including whether the use is of a commercial nature or is for nonprofit educational purposes: Nonprofit educational and noncommercial uses are more likely to be fair use. This does not mean that all nonprofit education and noncommercial uses are fair use or that all commercial uses are not fair. Instead, courts will balance the purpose and character of the use against the other factors below. Additionally, "transformative" uses are more likely to be considered fair. Transformative uses are those that add something new, with a further purpose or different character, and do not substitute for the original use of the work.
2. Nature of the copyrighted work: Using a more creative or imaginative work (such as a novel, movie, or song) is less likely to support fair use than using a factual work (such as a technical article or news item). In addition, use of an unpublished work is less likely to be considered fair.
3. Amount and substantiality of the portion used in relation to the copyrighted work as a whole: Courts look at both the quantity and quality of the copyrighted material that was used. Using a large portion of the copyrighted work is less likely to be fair use. However, courts have occasionally found use of an entire work to be fair use, and in other contexts, using even a small amount of a copyrighted work was determined not to be fair use because the selection was an important part—or the "heart"—of the work.
4. Effect of the use upon the potential market for or value of the copyrighted work: Here, courts review whether, and to what extent, the unlicensed use harms the existing or future market for the copyright owner's original work. In assessing this factor, courts consider whether the use is hurting the current market for the original work (for example, by displacing sales of the original) and whether the use could cause substantial harm if it were to become widespread.

In addition to these four factors, the statute also allows courts to consider any other factors that may be relevant to the fair use analysis. Courts evaluate fair use claims on a case-by-case basis, and the outcome of any given case depends on the specific facts of that case. There is no formula to ensure that a predetermined percentage or amount of a work—or specific number of words, lines, pages, copies—may be used without permission.

The justification of the fair use doctrine turns primarily on whether, and to what extent, the challenged use is transformative. "The use must be productive and must employ the quoted matter in a different manner or for a different purpose from the original. A quotation of copyrighted material that merely repackages or republishes the original is unlikely to pass the test.... If, on the other hand, the secondary use adds value to the original—if the quoted matter is used as raw material, transformed in the creation of new information, new aesthetics, new insights and understandings—this is the very type of activity that the fair use doctrine intends to protect for the enrichment of society."

The Copyright Office provides a searchable list of fair use case law.

== Infringement ==
Copyright infringement occurs when someone violates one of the exclusive rights listed in 17 U.S.C. § 106 Commonly, this involves someone creating or distributing a copy of a protected work that is "substantially similar" to the original version.

Infringements requires copying. If two people happen to write exactly the same story, without knowledge of the other, there is no infringement.

=== Copyright infringement litigation ===
The Copyright Office handles copyright registrations, but it does not adjudicate copyright infringement disputes. A copyright owner may bring a copyright infringement lawsuit in federal court. Federal courts have exclusive subject-matter jurisdiction over copyright infringement cases. That is, an infringement case may not be brought in state courts. An exception applies for works protected under state law but not under federal law; pre-1972 sound recordings fell under this status until the Music Modernization Act brought them under federal copyright law.

For a copyright infringement lawsuit to succeed, a copyright holder must prove ownership of a valid copyright and copying of constituent elements of the work that are original. The latter requires the copyright owner to establish both actual copying and improper appropriation of the work. The copyright owner, as plaintiff, bears the burden of establishing these elements of the prima facie case for infringement.

==== Ownership of valid copyright ====
A plaintiff establishes ownership by authorship (by the plaintiff itself or by someone who assigned rights to the plaintiff) of an original work of authorship that is fixed in a tangible medium (e.g. a book or musical recording).

Registration is not required to establish copyright protection, but registration is necessary before bringing a lawsuit. Registration is also useful because it creates a presumption of a valid copyright, allows the plaintiff to collect enhanced "statutory damages", and makes the plaintiff eligible for an award of attorney fees.

==== Actual copying ====
A plaintiff establishes "actual copying" with direct or indirect evidence. Direct evidence is satisfied either by a defendant's admission to copying or the testimony of witnesses who observed the defendant in the act. More commonly, a plaintiff relies on circumstantial or indirect evidence. A court will infer copying by a showing of a "striking similarity" between the copyrighted work and the alleged copy, along with a showing of both access and use of that access. A plaintiff may establish "access" by proof of distribution over a large geographical area or by eyewitness testimony that the defendant owned a copy of the protected work. Access alone is not sufficient to establish infringement. The plaintiff must show a similarity between the two works, and the degree of similarity will affect the probability that illicit copying in fact occurred in the court's eyes. Even then, the plaintiff must show that the copying amounted to improper appropriation. Indeed, the United States Supreme Court has held that not all copying constitutes infringement and a showing of misappropriation is necessary.

==== Misappropriation ====
A copyrighted work may contain elements that are not copyrightable, such as content in the public domain, themes, facts, or ideas. A plaintiff alleging misappropriation must first demonstrate that what the defendant appropriated from the copyrighted work was protectable. Second, a plaintiff must show that the intended audience will recognize substantial similarities between the two works. The intended audience may be the general public, or a specialized field. The degree of similarity necessary for a court to find misappropriation is not easily defined. Indeed, "the test for infringement of a copyright is of necessity vague."

Two methods are used to determine if unlawful appropriation has occurred: the "subtractive method" and the "totality method".

The subtractive method, also known as the "abstraction/subtraction approach", seeks to analyze which parts of a copyrighted work are protectible and which are not. The unprotected elements are subtracted and the fact finder then determines whether substantial similarities exist in the protectible expression which remains. For instance, if the copyright holder for West Side Story alleged infringement, the elements of that musical borrowed from Romeo and Juliet would be subtracted before comparing it to the allegedly infringing work because Romeo and Juliet exists in the public domain.

The totality method, also known as the "total concept and feel" approach, takes the work as a whole with all elements included when determining if a substantial similarity exists. This was first formulated in Roth Greeting Cards v. United Card Co. (1970). The individual elements of the alleged infringing work may by themselves be substantially different from their corresponding part in the copyrighted work, but nevertheless taken together be a clear misappropriation of copyrightable material.

Modern courts may sometimes use both methods in their analysis of misappropriation. In other instances, one method may find misappropriation while the other would not, making misappropriation a contentious topic in infringement litigation.

=== Civil remedies ===
A successful copyright infringement plaintiff may seek both injunctive relief and monetary damages. As of 2019, the United States Supreme Court has held that a copyright holder must register his copyright with the U.S. copyright office before he may seek any judicial remedies for infringement.

Copyright Act § 502 authorizes courts to grant both preliminary and permanent injunctions against copyright infringement. There are also provisions for impounding allegedly infringing copies and other materials used to infringe, and for their destruction.

Copyright Act § 504 gives the copyright owner a choice of recovering: (1) their actual damages and any additional profits of the defendant; or (2) statutory damages.

However, Title 17 United States Code §411(a) states that a civil action to enforce a copyright claim in a US work cannot be made until the work has been registered with the U.S. Copyright Office, with a narrow exception if the claim was filed and rejected by the Copyright Office. In 2019, the U.S. Supreme Court decided that §411(a) requires that a lawsuit cannot be initiated until the Copyright Office has processed, not merely received, the application.

==== Equitable relief ====
Both temporary and permanent injunctions are available to prevent or restrain infringement of a copyright. An injunction is a court order directing the defendant to stop doing something (e.g., stop selling infringing copies). One form of equitable relief that is available in copyright cases is a seizure order. At any time during the lawsuit, the court may order the impoundment of any and all copies of the infringing products. The seizure order may include materials used to produce such copies, such as master tapes, film negatives, and printing plates. Items that are impounded during the course of the lawsuit can, if the plaintiff wins, be ordered destroyed as part of the final decree.

==== Monetary damages ====
A copyright holder can also seek monetary damages. Injunctions and damages are not mutually exclusive. One can have injunctions and no damages, damages and no injunctions, or both injunctions and damages. There are two types of damages: actual damages and profits, or statutory damages.

The copyright owner may recover the profits they would have earned absent the infringement (actual damages) and any profits the infringer might have made as a result of the infringement but that are not already considered in calculating actual damages. To recover actual damages, the plaintiff must prove to the court that, in the absence of the infringement, the plaintiff would have been able to make additional sales, or perhaps been able to charge higher prices, and that this would have resulted in profits given the owner's cost structure. In some cases, the profits earned by the infringer exploiting the copyrighted material may exceed those earned by or potentially available to the owner. In these circumstances, the copyright owner can recover the infringer's profits if a nexus can be demonstrated between the profits and the infringing use.

Statutory damages are sometimes preferable for the plaintiff if actual damages and profits are too small or too difficult to prove. If the copyright was registered either within three months of publication or before the infringement, then the plaintiff is eligible to seek statutory damages. Statutory damages are calculated per work infringed. Statutory damages within the range of $750 to $30,000 per work can be awarded by the court, but the amount can be lowered if the infringement is deemed inadvertent or increased significantly if the infringement is willful:

- In case of "innocent infringement", the amount may be reduced to a sum "not less than $200" for an effective range of $200 to $30,000 per work. "Innocent" is a technical term. In particular, if the work carries a copyright notice, the infringer usually cannot claim innocence.
- In case of "willful infringement" (again, "willful" is a technical term), statutory damages can be no more than $150,000 for an effective range of $750 to $150,000 per work.

Damages in copyright cases can be very high. In Lowry's Reports, Inc. v. Legg Mason Inc., a 2003 lawsuit by a publisher of stock analysis newsletters against a company that bought one copy of the newsletters and made multiple copies for use in-house, the jury awarded damages—actual damages for some newsletters and statutory damages for other newsletters—totaling $20 million.

==== Attorney's fees ====
Copyright Act § 505 permits courts, in their discretion, to award costs against either party and to award reasonable attorney fees to the prevailing party. The court may (but is not required to) award to the "prevailing party" reasonable attorney's fees. This applies to both a winning plaintiff (copyright owner) and a winning defendant (accused infringer). However, attorney's fees award is not available against the government. Like statutory damages, attorney's fees are not available if the work infringed is not registered at the time of infringement.

=== Criminal penalties ===
In addition to the civil remedies, the Copyright Act provides for criminal prosecution in some cases of willful copyright infringement. There are also criminal sanctions for fraudulent copyright notice, fraudulent removal of copyright notice, and false representations in applications for copyright registration. The Digital Millennium Copyright Act imposes criminal sanctions for certain acts of circumvention and interference with copyright management information. There are not criminal sanctions for violating the rights of attribution and integrity held by the author of a work of visual art.

Criminal penalties for copyright infringement include:

- A fine of not more than $500,000 or imprisonment for not more than five years, or both, for the first offense.
- A fine of not more than $1 million or imprisonment for not more than 10 years, or both, for repeated offenses.

Nonprofit libraries, archives, education institutions and public broadcasting entities are exempt from criminal prosecution.

Felony penalties for first offenses begin at seven copies for audiovisual works, and one hundred copies for sound recordings.

=== Government infringement ===
The US government, its agencies and officials, and corporations owned or controlled by it, are subject to suit for copyright infringement. All infringement claims against the U.S. that did not arise in a foreign country must be filed with the United States Court of Federal Claims within three years of the infringing action. Claims filed in the wrong court are dismissed for lack of subject-matter jurisdiction. The government and its agencies are also authorized to settle the infringement claims out of court.

The states have sovereign immunity provided by the Eleventh Amendment to the United States Constitution, which bars most forms of lawsuits against states in federal courts, but can be abrogated in certain circumstances by Congress. The Copyright Remedy and Clarification Act of 1990 (CRCA) states in part that states are liable to copyright infringement "in the same manner and to the same extent as any nongovernmental entity" and also that states and state entities and officials "shall not be immune, under the Eleventh Amendment to the Constitution of the United States or under any other doctrine of sovereign immunity, from suit in Federal Court by any person" alleging copyright infringement. The CRCA has been declared unconstitutional by several federal courts., and this was upheld by the US Supreme Court on March 23, 2020.

As a result of the ruling, Nautilus Productions, the plaintiff in Allen v. Cooper, filed a motion for reconsideration in the United States District Court for the Eastern District of North Carolina. On August 18, 2021, Judge Terrence Boyle granted the motion for reconsideration which North Carolina promptly appealed to the United States Court of Appeals for the Fourth Circuit. The 4th Circuit denied the state's motion on October 14, 2022. Nautilus then filed their second amended complaint on February 8, 2023, alleging 5th and 14th Amendment violations of Nautilus' constitutional rights, additional copyright violations, and claiming that North Carolina's "Blackbeard's Law" represents a bill of attainder.

Eight years after the passage of Blackbeard's Law, on June 30, 2023, North Carolina Gov. Roy Cooper signed a bill repealing the law.

== Public domain ==
Works in the public domain are free for anyone to copy and use. Strictly speaking, the term public domain means that the work is not covered by any intellectual property rights at all (copyright, trademark, patent, or otherwise), though it commonly refers to just the absence of copyright.

A work may enter the public domain in a number of different ways. For example, the copyright protecting the work may have expired, the owner may have explicitly donated the work to the public, the work may not be the type of work that copyright can protect, or the work may have been created by the U.S. federal government as part of a federal employee's official duties. There are exceptions such as by assignment from contractors.

== Orphan works ==
The "orphan works" problem arose in the United States with the enactment of the Copyright Act of 1976, which eliminated the need to register copyrighted works, instead declaring that all "original works of authorship fixed in any tangible medium of expression" fall into copyright status. The elimination of registration also eliminated a central recording location to track and identify copyright holders. Consequently, potential users of copyrighted works, e.g., filmmakers or biographers, must assume that many works they might use are copyrighted. Where the planned use would not be otherwise permitted by law (for example, by fair use), they must themselves individually investigate the copyright status of each work they plan to use. With no central database of copyright holders, identifying and contacting copyright holders can sometimes be difficult; those works that fall into this category may be considered "orphaned".

== Copyright reform ==
Numerous legal commentators have argued that copyright protections are "overly long" and create an unwarranted delay before copyrighted works are allowed to enter into the public domain. In 2022, legislation introduced by Senator Josh Hawley, entitled the Copyright Clause Restoration Act of 2022, seeks to reduce the protection from 70 years after the creator's death (post-1978) and 95 years after publication (pre-1978) to 28 years, with the option to renew it at the end of that term for a limit of 56 years total. These same terms were in place from 1909 up until 1976. A similar bill was also introduced in 2023.

== See also ==
- Bilateral copyright agreements of the United States
- Copyright Catalog
- Copyright status of works by subnational governments of the United States
- Copyright status of works by the federal government of the United States
- Creative Commons licenses and List of free-content licenses
- Fair Use Project
- Open-source license
- United States copyright law in the performing arts
