= American Society for Testing & Materials v. Public.Resource.Org =

United States legal case

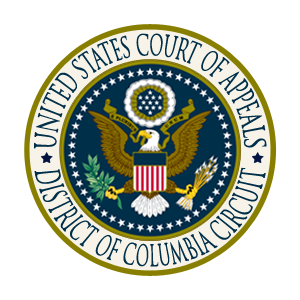
- Court: Court of Appeals for the District of Columbia Circuit
- Full case name: American Society for Testing and Materials et al. v. Public.Resource.Org

American Society for Testing & Materials v. Public.Resource.Org is a United States court case concerning copyright of published building codes and fire codes and public access to the same. In 2013, Public.Resource.Org was sued by the ASTM, the National Fire Protection Association, and the American Society of Heating, Refrigerating and Air Conditioning Engineers for scanning and making available building codes and fire codes which these organizations consider their copyrighted property. The case was heard by the District Court for the District of Columbia with Judge Tanya S. Chutkan presiding. Chutkan ruled against Public.Resource.Org and ordered Malamud to delete all the standards from the Internet. Public.Resource.Org appealed the case to the D.C. Circuit. In 2018, the D.C. Circuit reversed and remanded the decision, holding that the fair use doctrines had been improperly applied. In March 2022 Chutkan issued an opinion that would allow Public.Resource.Org to reproduce 184 standards under fair use, partially reproduce 1 standard, and deny reproduction of 32 standards that were found to differ in substantive ways from those incorporated by law. The plaintiffs then appealed to the D.C. Circuit, which affirmed the trial court decision.

== Support for Public.Resource.Org ==
A number of library and public interest associations weighed in supporting the position of Public.Resource.Org. These organizations include American Association of Law Libraries, Electronic Frontier Foundation, Library Futures, Reporters Committee for Freedom of the Press, and Public Citizen.

== See also ==
- Edict of government, the legal principle involved in the case
