= Georgia v. Public.Resource.Org, Inc. =

2020 United States Supreme Court case

- Supreme Court of the United States

Argued December 2, 2019 Decided April 27, 2020
- Full case name: Georgia, et al., Petitioners v. Public.Resource.Org, Inc.
- Docket no.: 18-1150
- Citations: 590 U.S. 255 (more) 140 S. Ct. 1498; 206 L. Ed. 2d 732
- Argument: Oral argument

Case history
- Prior: Code Revision Comm'n v. Public.Resource.Org, Inc., 244 F. Supp. 3d 1350 (N.D. Ga. 2017); reversed and remanded sub nom. Code Revision Comm'n for Gen. Assembly of Georgia v. Public.Resource.Org, Inc., 906 F.3d 1229 (11th Cir. 2018); cert. granted, 139 S. Ct. 2746 (2019).

Holding
- Legal annotations that are created by legislatures are ineligible for copyright.

Court membership
- Chief Justice John Roberts Associate Justices Clarence Thomas · Ruth Bader Ginsburg; Stephen Breyer · Samuel Alito; Sonia Sotomayor · Elena Kagan; Neil Gorsuch · Brett Kavanaugh

Case opinions
- Majority: Roberts, joined by Sotomayor, Kagan, Gorsuch, Kavanaugh
- Dissent: Thomas, joined by Alito; Breyer (all but Part II–A and footnote 6)
- Dissent: Ginsburg, joined by Breyer

Georgia v. Public.Resource.Org, Inc., 590 U.S. 255 (2020), is a United States Supreme Court case regarding "whether the government edicts doctrine extends to—and thus renders uncopyrightable—works that lack the force of law, such as the annotations in the Official Code of Georgia Annotated" (OCGA). On April 27, 2020, the Court ruled 5–4 that the OCGA cannot be copyrighted because the OCGA's annotations were "authored by an arm of the legislature in the course of its legislative duties"; thus the Court found that the annotations fall under the government edicts doctrine and are ineligible for copyright.

Litigation began in 2013 after Carl Malamud published the OCGA on Public.Resource.Org (PRO). The state of Georgia filed a lawsuit in 2015. In March 2017, a federal court in the Northern District of Georgia ruled in the state's favor, after which in 2018 the Eleventh Circuit reversed the ruling. Both Georgia and PRO appealed to the Supreme Court, which heard arguments in December 2019.

== Background ==
=== Government edicts ===
In the United States, laws, statutes, and court decisions, all as edicts of government, are considered to be in the public domain, available to the public for free and not protected by copyright. This doctrine is rooted in the Copyright Act's 'authorship' requirement and posits that officials empowered to speak with the force of law cannot be the authors of the works they create in the course of their official duties. Based on the principle, the law must be free for publication to all.

=== Georgia ===
The Official Code of Georgia Annotated (OCGA) is assembled by a state entity called the Code Revision Commission (the Commission) and is the official law of Georgia.

The OCGA contains both the official statutes as well as annotations. The annotations explain and expound upon the statutes and contain "summaries of state attorney general's opinions, advisory opinions by the State Bar of Georgia, summaries of important court rulings, excerpts of law review articles, legislative histories[,] and repeals". The Commission entered into a work-for-hire agreement with Matthew Bender & Co., Inc., a division of the LexisNexis Group, to prepare annotations. The Georgia government asserted that it held copyright to the OCGA; further, Georgia's legislature exempted itself from the state's open records law. While the state claimed that the OCGA is easily accessible via libraries, journalists for Atlanta news channel 11Alive were "unable to find a complete set of current law books at three branches of the Fulton County Public Library, including the main branch in downtown Atlanta", noting that "[t]he law books were kept behind a locked door, and we had to ask for special permission to view them. Some volumes were as much as six years out of date." Additionally, LexisNexis's website displays only the statutory code and not the annotations.

In 2013, Carl Malamud purchased a 186-volume hard copy of the OCGA (at a cost of over $1,000; the cost is just below $400 for Georgia residents) and published the contents on the website Public.Resource.Org. In response, the State of Georgia, specifically the Code Revision Commission of the Georgia General Assembly, which oversees the OCGA's copyright, threatened to sue Malamud for copyright infringement over this posting.

=== District court ===
In 2015, Georgia's Code Revision Commission filed a copyright infringement lawsuit against PRO in the U.S. District Court for the Northern District of Georgia, demanding that the OCGA be taken offline. Public.Resource.Org asserted in its defense that since the state has chosen to make the Official Code of Georgia Annotated the official and authoritative code of the entire state, the Code should not be subject to copyright law, and should be freely available for all citizens to read and access. The code also holds, in denoting the annotated code as the "official code," that authorship and copyright remains with the State and not with the publisher. In the lawsuit, Georgia further alleged that Malamud's actions reflected a "strategy of terrorism". State representative Johnnie Caldwell Jr., Chairman of the Code Revision Commission, issued a statement explaining that "the OCGA contains two separate and distinct types of content... the law itself... [and] ancillary material, such as cross references, case annotations, editor's notes, law reviews, etc. Such ancillary material is expressly not law."

On March 23, 2017, a federal court in the United States District Court for the Northern District of Georgia ruled in favor of the state. It acknowledged that the annotations in the OCGA presented “an unusual case because most official codes are not annotated and most annotated codes are not official" and therefore that these annotations were eligible for copyright protection since they were “not enacted into law” and lacked “the force of law.” As a result it held that PRO did not "[meet] its burden of proving fair use, and [the state of Georgia] [is] entitled to partial summary judgment" and entered a permanent injunction requiring PRO to cease its distribution activities and to remove the digital copies of the OCGA from the internet.

=== Eleventh Circuit ===
On October 18, 2018, the United States Court of Appeals for the Eleventh Circuit unanimously reversed the previous ruling, finding that the OCGA is "intrinsically public domain material" and that its annotations "clearly have authoritative weight in explicating and establishing the meaning and effect of Georgia's laws". The Court relied on the case of Banks v. Manchester (1888), in which the Supreme Court articulated the government edicts doctrine by finding that "there can be no copyright in the opinions of the judges, or in the work done by them in their official capacity as judges", and a report from the Copyright Office noting that "the judicially established rule... still prevent[s] copyright in the text of state laws... and similar official documents". The Court also identified three factors that would determine whether authorship in a work is constrictively attributable to that of the people, namely:

1. the identity of the public official who created the work;
2. the nature of the work; and
3. the process by which the work was produced.

As a result the Court stated that the people are "constructive authors" of the law and judges and legislators are merely draftsman that are exercising authority delegated to them. Thus, the court found that "the annotations in the OCGA, while not having the force of law, are part and parcel of the law. They are so enmeshed with Georgia's law as to be inextricable... They are therefore uncopyrightable".

The state assembly of Georgia appealed this decision to the United States Supreme Court. Both PRO and the state of Georgia urged the Supreme Court to grant certiorari to the government's appeal; on June 24, 2019, the Supreme Court agreed to review the case (No. 18-1150). The Court heard oral arguments in the case on December 2, 2019.

== Supreme Court ==
The Court accepted the case to decide the question:

Whether the government edicts doctrine extends to—and thus renders uncopyrightable—works that lack the force of law, such as the annotations in the Official Code of Georgia Annotated.

Oral arguments were held on December 2, 2019, at which many of the justices focused on the role of the legislature in approving the annotated statutes for publication, questioning whether this made the annotations equivalent to legislation, which cannot be copyrighted.

On April 27, 2020, the Court ruled in a 5-to-4 decision, that Georgia does not have copyright over its annotated legal code. Chief Justice John Roberts authored the majority opinion, joined by Associate Justices Sonia Sotomayor, Elena Kagan, Neil Gorsuch, and Brett Kavanaugh: he noted that, binding law or not, official works of the Georgia legislature could not be copyrighted, as they could deprive citizens of knowledge of those laws and their corollaries. Justice Ruth Bader Ginsburg filed a dissenting opinion, joined by Stephen Breyer, while Justice Clarence Thomas filed another dissenting opinion with which Samuel Alito joined and Breyer joined except for Part II-A and footnote 6.

=== Majority ===
The majority held that copyright protection does not extend to the annotations contained in Georgia's official annotated code. The route taken to hold this was the "government edicts doctrine". Like the 11th Circuit, they cited the SCOTUS decision in Banks v. Manchester (1888) and extend the same logic as they applied to legal binding and non-bind material created by judges, to non-binding, non-authoritative and explanatory legal materials created by a legislative body vested with the authority to make law.

The Court adopted the following framework to apply the government edicts doctrine as follows:

First, regarding the identity of the official that created the work, the Court held that the Commission, as the sole author of the work (since the annotations prepared by LexisNexis pursuant to the work-for-hire agreement), qualifies as a legislator. They held that the Commission functions as an arm for the Georgia Legislature and its work thus falls under the sphere of "legislative authority". In order to hold this they noted that the Commission was composed predominantly of legislators and received funding designated by the law for the legislative branch. Finally, it was the legislature itself that approved and merged the annotations with the statutory provisions and published the OCGA "by authority of the state".

Second, regarding the nature of work, the Court held that the Commission creating the annotations is in the "discharge" of its legislative duties. Although the annotations are not enacted into law through bicameralism and presentment, the preparation of the annotations is under an act of "legislative authority". The fact that the commentary and case laws in the annotations are approved by the legislature shows that they deemed it to be relevant.

The Court rejected the argument by the State of Georgia that the annotations are copyrightable by virtue of §101 of the US Copyright Statute since it specifically lists "annotations" among the kinds of works eligible for copyright protection. They ruled that this provision refers only to annotations that represent an original work of "authorship" and the Commission, serving in its official capacity, cannot serve as an author due to the government edicts doctrine. They clarified that §101 protects annotations in case they are prepared by a private party or non-lawmaking officials. This is elucidated by distinguishing the decision in Banks from Callaghan v. Myers where the Court permitted a reporter to hold copyright in explanatory materials he had added to the judgements, such as headnotes, syllabi, tables of contents, on the grounds that he did not have authority to speak with the force of law.

The Court also rejected the contention that the US Copyright Statute while excluding "work[s] prepared by an officer or employee of the United States Government as part of that person's official duties" from copyright protection, does not establish a similar rule for the States. The Court held that the policy reasons that justify the Federal Government's decision to forfeit copyright protection for its own proprietary works, does not suggest an intent to displace the already narrow government edicts doctrine with respect to the States. The doctrine does not apply to non-lawmaking officials, leaving States free to assert copyright in the vast majority of expressive works they produce, such as those created by their universities, libraries, tourism offices, and so on.

The State of Georgia also contended on policy grounds that the purpose of the Copyright Act is to promote the creation and dissemination of creative works and without such protection many states will be unable induce private parties to assist in the preparation of affordable annotated codes for widespread distribution. The Court however states that it cannot decide this matter and that the Congress is the right body to decide such a policy issue.

Additionally, contrary to Justice Thomas' dissent and the State of Georgia's contention that the government edicts doctrine lacks textual footing, the Court stated that the doctrine has textual footing by way of the "authorship" requirement. Specifically, Congress' enactment of the 1976 Copyright Act with the word "author[ship]", the same phrase interpreted by Banks, implicitly incorporates the Banks' interpretation of the phrase "author" into the 1976 Copyright Act.

The Court finally observes that a decision allowing copyright protection for anything merely falling short of being classified as a statute or a judicial opinion would result in First Amendment concerns.

=== Dissents ===
==== Thomas ====
Justice Thomas holds that regulations cannot be copyrighted, but accompanying notes lacking legal force can be. The opinion states that the majority opinion was flawed on the following precedential and textual grounds.

===== Precedential Grounds =====
The opinion states that the majority incorrectly interpreted precedents and that they did not attempt to examine the root and context of the precedents. The opinion notes that while precedents establish that judicial opinion cannot be copyrighted, they do not exclude the notes prepared by an official court reporter published together with reported opinions from copyright protection.

The opinion illustrates the context in which Banks was decided, i.e., in the 19th century, much before multiple revisions made to the Copyright Act. At the time, copyright protection was extended for books, maps, prints, engravings, musical and dramatic compositions, photographs, and works of art. It notes that judicial opinions were starkly different from this list of works because they are legally binding, reflect the application of the rule of law, and in turn represent the implementation of the will of the people. They note that in Banks, the Court never categorically prohibited the States from holding copyrights as authors or assignees and merely stated that the State fell outside the scope of the Act because it was not a "resident" or "citizen of the United States," (which were the statutory requirements for "authorship" back then). The opinion observes that the Court in Banks stated "[w]hether the State could take out a copyright for itself, or could enjoy the benefit of one taken out by an individual for it, as the assignee of a citizen of the United States or a resident therein, who should be the author of a book, is a question not involved in the present case, and we refrain from considering it." The opinion also notes that in Callaghan, the Court, while accepting the principle in Banks, limited its application by concluding that “no [similar] ground of public policy” justified denying a state official a copyright "cover[ing] the matter which is the result of his intellectual labor."

Thomas distinguished judicial opinions from statutes for three reasons: First, annotations do not embody the will of the people since the General Assembly does not enact statutory annotation under its legislative power(they do not pass through the processes of bicameralism and presentment). They also do not create any binding legal obligations. Second, unlike judges and legislators, the creators of annotations are incentivised by copyright law and profits. Third, while copyrighting judicial opinions and statutes would be contrary to fair notice of the laws, i.e., the legal presumption that every citizen is aware of the law, the same does not apply to annotations since they are non-binding. They state that it is incorrect to hold that without access to annotations readers will be unable to understand the true meaning of the law and the status of the law. This is because, users may directly access court decisions themselves to understand the above. Inability to access the OCGA, therefore, only deprives readers of these additional functions and not the underlying legal information itself.

===== Textual Grounds =====
The decision also questions the origins and the validity of the government edicts doctrine. They highlight four indications within the text of the Copyright Act to support their reading of the precedents: First, the Act does not define the word "author" and neither does it make any reference to the government edicts doctrine. Second, while the Act excludes protection for works prepared by an officer or employee of the Government, the Act does not prohibit protection to works of state governments or works prepared at their behest. Third, the Act notes that annotations are copyrightable derivative works. Fourth, the Act provides that an author may hold a copyright in "material contributed" in a derivative work, "as distinguished from the preexisting material employed in the work."

===== Policy issues =====
The opinion also highlights the difficulties in implementing the decision of the majority since nearly all States with annotated codes contract with private parties to make annotations who are almost invariably under the supervision of the legislative or judicial branch officers. It states that disallowing copyright would result in the creation of an "economy-class" or sub par version of the Code, that would not contain these important annotations. This is because without the means of recuperating the resources spent on research for the annotations, this mechanism of contracting third parties to make annotations available at a fraction of a cost would cease to exist.

It highlights the fact that the majority's decision fails to provide clarity on whether the factors which it used to classify the Commission as adjunct to the legislature (membership, funding etc) are exhaustive or illustrative and whether some factors possess more weight when deciding whether to deem an oversight body a legislative adjunct.

==== Ginsburg ====
The opinion notes that not every work produced by legislators is ineligible for copyright protection and that the government edicts doctrine shields only works that are (1) created by judges and legislators (2) in the course of their judicial and legislative duties. While observing that annotations created by judges are not copyrightable while those created by legislators are, she highlights the difference between the roles of the two – while the judiciary is assigned the duty of interpretation and application of the law, and at times making applicable law, the legislature on the other hand is assigned the role of making laws, instead of construing the statutes after they are enacted.

Justice Ginsburg held that the annotations in the OCGA are not done in a legislative capacity because: First, the annotations are not created contemporaneously with the statutes and merely a commentary on the statutes that have already been enacted. This sets the OCGA annotations apart from uncopyrightable legislative materials like committee reports, generated before a law’s enactment, and tied tightly to the task of law-formulation. Second, annotations are descriptive rather than prescriptive and contain the views of the author on the given statute. Third, annotations are given for the purpose of convenient reference by the public and aim to inform the citizenry at large. Merely because they are considered to be merged with the statutory provisions does not render the annotations to be more than explanatory, referential, or commentarial material.

== See also ==
- Edict of government
- Veeck v. Southern Building Code Congress Int'l
