= List of United States Supreme Court cases, volume 33 =

Supreme Court of the United States
- Interactive map of Supreme Court of the United States
- 38°53′26″N 77°00′16″W
- Established: March 4, 1789; 237 years ago
- Location: Washington, D.C.
- Coordinates: 38°53′26″N 77°00′16″W
- Composition method: Presidential nomination with Senate confirmation
- Authorised by: Constitution of the United States, Art. III, § 1
- Judge term length: life tenure, subject to impeachment and removal
- Number of positions: 9 (by statute)
- Website: supremecourt.gov

This is a list of cases reported in volume 33 (8 Pet.) of United States Reports, decided by the Supreme Court of the United States in 1834.

== Nominative reports ==
In 1874, the U.S. government created the United States Reports, and retroactively numbered older privately-published case reports as part of the new series. As a result, cases appearing in volumes 1–90 of U.S. Reports have dual citation forms; one for the volume number of U.S. Reports, and one for the volume number of the reports named for the relevant reporter of decisions (these are called "nominative reports").

=== Richard Peters, Jr. ===
Starting with the 26th volume of U.S. Reports, the Reporter of Decisions of the Supreme Court of the United States was Richard Peters, Jr. Peters was Reporter of Decisions from 1828 to 1843, covering volumes 26 through 41 of United States Reports which correspond to volumes 1 through 16 of his Peters's Reports. As such, the dual form of citation to, for example, Holt v. Rogers is 33 U.S. (8 Pet.) 420 (1834).

== Justices of the Supreme Court at the time of 33 U.S. (8 Pet.) ==
The Supreme Court is established by Article III, Section 1 of the Constitution of the United States, which says: "The judicial Power of the United States, shall be vested in one supreme Court . . .". The size of the Court is not specified; the Constitution leaves it to Congress to set the number of justices. Under the Judiciary Act of 1789 Congress originally fixed the number of justices at six (one chief justice and five associate justices). Since 1789 Congress has varied the size of the Court from six to seven, nine, ten, and back to nine justices (always including one chief justice).

When the cases in 33 U.S. (8 Pet.) were decided, the Court comprised these seven justices:

Portrait	Justice	Office	Home State	Succeeded	Date confirmed by the Senate (Vote)	Tenure on Supreme Court
	John Marshall	Chief Justice	Virginia	Oliver Ellsworth	January 27, 1801 (Acclamation)	February 4, 1801 – July 6, 1835 (Died)
	William Johnson	Associate Justice	South Carolina	Alfred Moore	March 24, 1804 (Acclamation)	May 7, 1804 – August 4, 1834 (Died)
	Gabriel Duvall	Associate Justice	Maryland	Samuel Chase	November 18, 1811 (Acclamation)	November 23, 1811 – January 12, 1835 (Resigned)
	Joseph Story	Associate Justice	Massachusetts	William Cushing	November 18, 1811 (Acclamation)	February 3, 1812 – September 10, 1845 (Died)
	Smith Thompson	Associate Justice	New York	Henry Brockholst Livingston	December 9, 1823 (Acclamation)	September 1, 1823 – December 18, 1843 (Died)
	John McLean	Associate Justice	Ohio	Robert Trimble	March 7, 1829 (Acclamation)	January 11, 1830 – April 4, 1861 (Died)
	Henry Baldwin	Associate Justice	Pennsylvania	Bushrod Washington	January 6, 1830 (41–2)	January 18, 1830 – April 21, 1844 (Died)

== Notable Case in 33 U.S. (8 Pet.) ==
=== Wheaton v. Peters ===
Wheaton v. Peters, 33 U.S. (8 Pet.) 591 (1834), was the first United States Supreme Court ruling on copyright. The Court upheld the power of Congress to make a grant of copyright protection subject to conditions, and rejected the doctrine of a common law copyright in published works. The Court also held that there could be no copyright in the Court's own written opinions.

== Citation style ==
Under the Judiciary Act of 1789 the federal court structure at the time comprised District Courts, which had general trial jurisdiction; Circuit Courts, which had mixed trial and appellate (from the US District Courts) jurisdiction; and the United States Supreme Court, which had appellate jurisdiction over the federal District and Circuit courts—and for certain issues over state courts. The Supreme Court also had limited original (i.e., in which cases could be filed directly with the Supreme Court without first having been heard by a lower federal or state court). There were one or more federal District Courts and/or Circuit Courts in each state, territory, or other geographical region.

Bluebook citation style is used for case names, citations, and jurisdictions.

- "C.C.D." = United States Circuit Court for the District of . . .
  - e.g.,"C.C.D.N.J." = United States Circuit Court for the District of New Jersey
- "D." = United States District Court for the District of . . .
  - e.g.,"D. Mass." = United States District Court for the District of Massachusetts
- "E." = Eastern; "M." = Middle; "N." = Northern; "S." = Southern; "W." = Western
  - e.g.,"C.C.S.D.N.Y." = United States Circuit Court for the Southern District of New York
  - e.g.,"M.D. Ala." = United States District Court for the Middle District of Alabama
- "Ct. Cl." = United States Court of Claims
- The abbreviation of a state's name alone indicates the highest appellate court in that state's judiciary at the time.
  - e.g.,"Pa." = Supreme Court of Pennsylvania
  - e.g.,"Me." = Supreme Judicial Court of Maine

== List of cases in 33 U.S. (8 Pet.) ==
Case Name	Page & year	Opinion of the Court	Concurring opinion(s)	Dissenting opinion(s)	Lower Court	Disposition
Dunn v. Clarke	1 (1834)	McLean	none	none	C.C.D. Ohio	certification
Stratton v. Jarvis	4 (1834)	Story	none	none	C.C.D. Md.	dismissed
Bank of the Metropolis v. Jones	12 (1834)	McLean	none	none	C.C.D.C.	reversed
Erwin v. Blake	18 (1834)	Story	none	none	C.C.D.W. Tenn.	multiple
Dick v. Balch	30 (1834)	Marshall	none	none	C.C.D.C.	affirmed
Byrne v. Missouri	40 (1834)	Marshall	none	none	Mo.	reversed
Lee v. Lee	44 (1834)	Thompson	none	none	C.C.D.C.	reversed
Armstrong v. Lear	52 (1834)	Story	none	none	C.C.D.C.	reversed
Garnett v. Jenkins	75 (1834)	McLean	none	none	C.C.D. Ky.	affirmed
Watson v. Mercer	88 (1834)	Story	none	none	Pa.	affirmed
Brown v. Keene	112 (1834)	Marshall	none	none	E.D. La.	reversed
Briscoe v. Bank of Ky.	118 (1834)	Marshall	none	none	C.C.S.D.N.Y.	certification
Yeaton v. Lenox	123 (1834)	Marshall	none	none	C.C.D.C.	affirmed
Bank of the U.S. v. Ritchie	128 (1834)	Marshall	none	none	C.C.D.C.	affirmed
Jackson v. Ashton	148 (1834)	Marshall	none	none	C.C.E.D. Pa.	reversed
United States v. Ringgold	150 (1834)	Thompson	none	none	C.C.D.C.	affirmed
Lutz v. Linthicum	165 (1834)	Story	none	none	C.C.D.C.	affirmed
Robinson v. Noble's Adm'rs	181 (1834)	McLean	none	none	W.D. Pa.	reversed
Binney v. Chesapeake & O. Canal Co.	201 (1834)	Thompson	none	none	C.C.D.C.	affirmed
Binney's Lessee v. Chesapeake & O. Canal Co.	214 (1834)	Marshall	none	none	C.C.D.C.	affirmed
M'Cutchen v. Marshall	220 (1834)	Thompson	none	none	C.C.D.W. Tenn.	affirmed
Gregg v. Sayre's Lessee	244 (1834)	McLean	none	none	W.D. Pa.	reversed
Mandeville v. Burt	256 (1834)	Marshall	none	none	C.C.D.C.	reversed
Chesapeake & O. Canal Co. v. Union Bank	259 (1834)	Marshall	none	none	C.C.D.C.	dismissed
Bank of the U.S. v. White	262 (1834)	Story	none	none	C.C.D. Ohio	reversed
United States v. Hack	271 (1834)	Thompson	none	none	C.C.D. Md.	affirmed
United States v. 112 Casks of Sugar	277 (1834)	Thompson	none	none	E.D. La.	affirmed
Mumma v. Potomac Co.	281 (1834)	Story	none	none	C.C.D.C.	affirmed
United States v. Randenbush	288 (1834)	Marshall	none	none	C.C.D. Pa.	certification
Life & F. Ins. Co. v. Wilson's Heirs	291 (1834)	McLean	none	none	E.D. La.	mandamus granted
Life & F. Ins. Co. v. Adams	306 (1834)	McLean	none	none	E.D. La.	mandamus granted
Mitchell v. United States	307 (1834)	Marshall	none	none	Fla. Super. Ct.	irregular procedure
Keene v. McDonough	308 (1834)	Thompson	none	none	E.D. La.	affirmed
Davis v. Packard	312 (1834)	Marshall	none	none	N.Y.	affirmed
King v. Mitchell	326 (1834)	Story	none	none	W.D. Va.	affirmed
Withers v. Withers	355 (1834)	Thompson	none	none	C.C.D.C.	reversed
Bank of the U.S. v. Donnally	361 (1834)	Story	none	none	W.D. Va.	affirmed
United States v. Jones I	375 (1834)	McLean	none	none	C.C.D.C.	affirmed
United States v. Jones II	387 (1834)	McLean	none	none	C.C.D.C.	affirmed
United States v. Jones III	399 (1834)	Story	none	none	C.C.D.C.	affirmed
Holt v. Rogers	420 (1834)	Story	none	none	C.C.D. Ky.	affirmed
Brown v. Swann	435 (1834)	Marshall	none	none	C.C.D.C.	continued
United States v. Clarke	436 (1834)	Marshall	none	none	Fla. Super. Ct.	multiple
United States v. Richard	470 (1834)	Marshall	none	none	Fla. Super. Ct.	multiple
United States v. Huertas I	475 (1834)	Marshall	none	none	Fla. Super. Ct.	affirmed
United States v. Gomez	477 (1834)	Marshall	none	none	Fla. Super. Ct.	affirmed
United States v. Fleming's Heirs	478 (1834)	Marshall	none	none	Fla. Super. Ct.	affirmed
United States v. Levi	479 (1834)	Marshall	none	none	Fla. Super. Ct.	multiple
United States v. Younge	484 (1834)	Marshall	none	none	Fla. Super. Ct.	affirmed
United States v. Hernandez	485 (1834)	Marshall	none	none	Fla. Super. Ct.	affirmed
United States v. Huertas II	488 (1834)	Marshall	none	none	Fla. Super. Ct.	multiple
United States v. Fatio's Heirs	492 (1834)	Marshall	none	none	Fla. Super. Ct.	affirmed
United States v. Gibson	494 (1834)	Marshall	none	none	Fla. Super. Ct.	affirmed
Carrington v. Merchants' Ins. Co.	495 (1834)	Story	none	none	C.C.D. Mass.	certification
Deneale v. Archer I	526 (1834)	Marshall	none	none	C.C.D.C.	dismissed
Deneale v. Archer II	528 (1834)	Marshall	none	none	C.C.D.C.	reversed
Boon's Heirs v. Chiles	532 (1834)	Marshall	none	none	C.C.D. Ky.	certification
The Ship Virgin	538 (1834)	Story	none	none	C.C.D. Md.	reversed
Hazard's Adm'r v. New E.M. Ins. Co.	557 (1834)	McLean	none	none	C.C.D. Mass.	multiple
Ex parte Bradstreet	588 (1834)	Marshall	none	none	N.D.N.Y.	mandamus denied
Wheaton v. Peters	591 (1834)	McLean	none	Thompson; Baldwin	C.C.E.D. Pa.	certification
United States v. Phelps	700 (1834)	Marshall	none	none	S.D.N.Y.	mandamus denied

== See also ==
- certificate of division
