= Official Code of Georgia Annotated =

Compendium of all laws in the U.S. state of Georgia

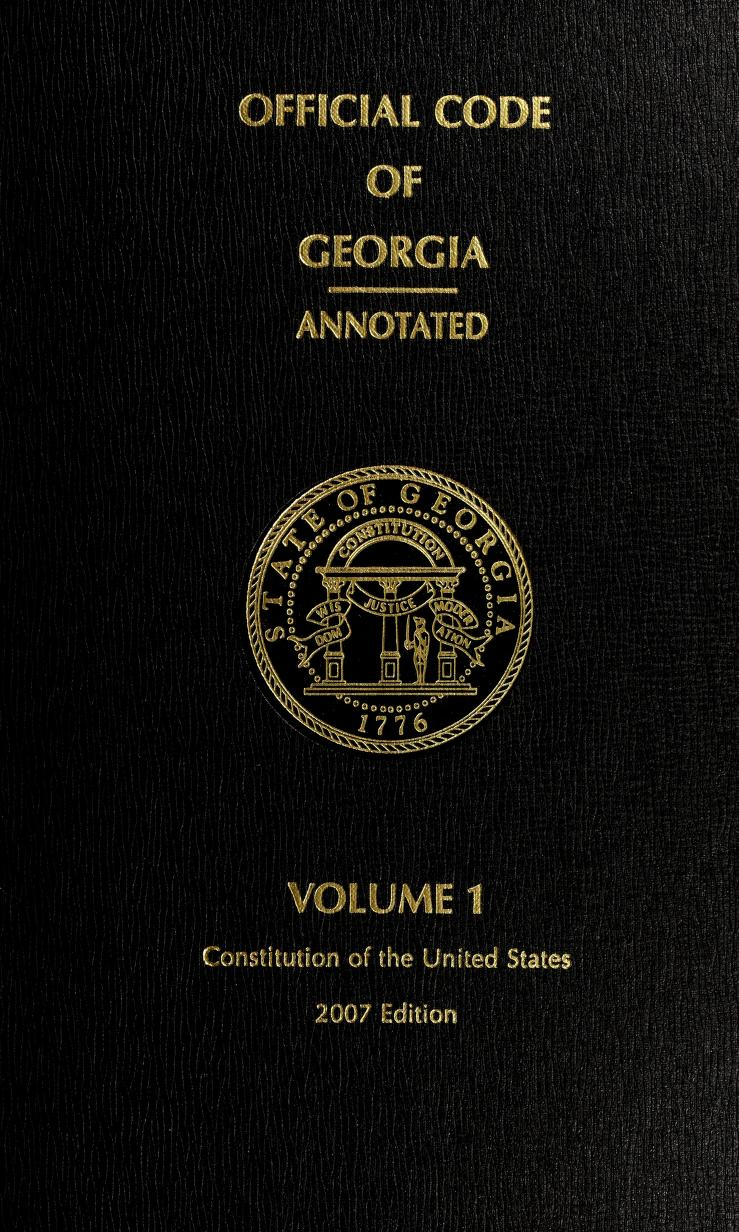
- Cover of vol. 1 (2007 ed.)
- Editor: Georgia Code Revision Commission
- ISBN: 978-0-327-11074-3
- OCLC: 8723145

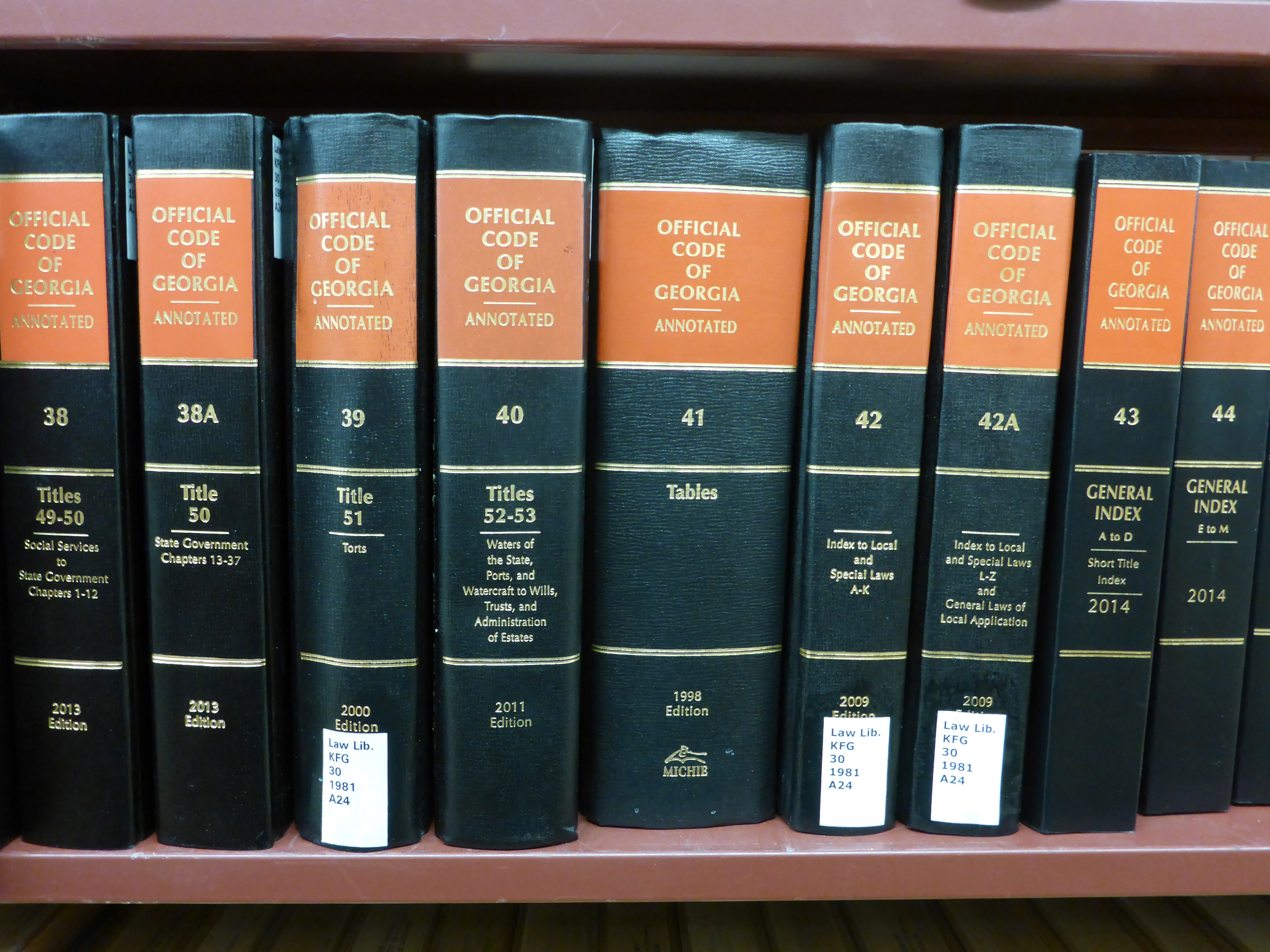
Volumes 38 to 44 of the OCGA on a shelf at a law library

The Official Code of Georgia Annotated or OCGA is the compendium of all laws in the state of Georgia. Like other state codes in the United States, its legal interpretation is subject to the U.S. Constitution, the U.S. Code, the Code of Federal Regulations, and the state's constitution. It is to the state what the U.S. Code is to the federal government.

An unusual feature of the OCGA is that, as stated in section 1-1-1, the privately prepared code annotations are officially merged into the official copy and are published under the authority of the state. The state held that it retained sole copyright in the code and that the authorized publisher held copyright to the annotations, though the laws of the state were the combination of the code and the annotations. Thus, the publisher would charge for reproductions of the OCGA, with a portion of the fee being returned to the state as a licensing fee. This longstanding feature goes back to the Code of 1872. In 2018, the 11th Circuit Court of Appeals held that the OCGA is not copyrightable, and the U.S. Supreme Court affirmed that holding in April 2020.

== History ==
The OCGA is the descendant of the first successfully enacted attempt in any English-speaking jurisdiction at a comprehensive codification of the substance of the common law, the Code of Georgia of 1861. The enactment of the Code predated the enactment of civil codes in 1866 in Dakota Territory and 1872 in California based on the work of New York-based law reformer David Dudley Field II. In 1889, Field expressly conceded that point in a written article; he credited his lack of awareness of the contemporaneous Georgia project "to the breaking out of the Civil War."

Unlike the relatively race-neutral Field civil code, large portions of the original Code of Georgia were drafted by the pro-slavery Confederate lawyer Thomas Reade Rootes Cobb, so that the Code was shot through with Cobb's strong bias in favor of slavery and white supremacy. For example, as originally enacted, it contained a presumption that blacks were prima facie slaves until proven otherwise. After the Civil War (in which Cobb died at the Battle of Fredericksburg), the Code had to be heavily revised in 1867 to eliminate portions that were obviously incompatible with the Thirteenth Amendment. The Code has been further revised and reenacted many times since.

== Copyrightability ==
In 2013 the State of Georgia, specifically the Georgia Code Revision Commission, threatened to sue Carl Malamud for copyright infringement over the posting of the Official Code of Georgia Annotated on the website Public.Resource.Org. In 2015, the State of Georgia filed a copyright infringement lawsuit in the U.S. District Court, Northern District of Georgia. The State of Georgia claimed a copyright in the Code, and that Carl Malamud and Public.Resource.Org had violated that copyright. Public.Resource.Org claimed that since the state has chosen to make the Official Code of Georgia Annotated the official and authoritative code of the entire state, the Code should not be subject to copyright law, and should be freely available for all citizens to read and access. The Code also holds, in denoting the annotated code as the "official code," that authorship and copyright remains with the State and not with the publisher.

In October 2018, the United States Court of Appeals for the Eleventh Circuit held that the Official Code of Georgia, Annotated, is not copyrightable. The Code Revision Commission, established by the Georgia General Assembly, appealed this decision to the United States Supreme Court. The Court heard the oral arguments on December 2, 2019. The case, Georgia v. Public.Resource.Org, Inc., decided the question:

Whether the government edicts doctrine extends to – and thus renders uncopyrightable – works that lack the force of law, such as the annotations in the Official Code of Georgia Annotated.

In April 2020, the Supreme Court of the United States affirmed the appeals court ruling by holding that the code annotations were ineligible for copyright protection.

== Titles ==
The OCGA is divided into 53 titles:

1. General Provisions
2. Agriculture
3. Alcoholic Beverages
4. Animals
5. Appeal and Error
6. Aviation
7. Banking and Finance
8. Buildings and Housing
9. Civil Practice
10. Commerce and Trade
11. Commercial Code
12. Conservation and Natural Resources
13. Contracts
14. Corporations, Partnerships, and Associations
15. Courts
16. Crimes and Offenses
17. Criminal Procedure
18. Debtor and Creditor
19. Domestic Relations
20. Education
21. Elections
22. Eminent Domain
23. Equity
24. Evidence
25. Fire Protection and Safety
26. Food, Drugs, and Cosmetics
27. Game and Fish
28. General Assembly
29. Guardian and Ward
30. Handicapped Persons
31. Health
32. Highways, Bridges, and Ferries
33. Insurance
34. Labor and Industrial Relations
35. Law Enforcement Officers and Agencies
36. Local Government
37. Mental Health
38. Military, Emergency Management, and Veterans Affairs
39. Minors
40. Motor Vehicles and Traffic
41. Nuisances
42. Penal Institutions
43. Professions and Businesses
44. Property
45. Public Officers and Employees
46. Public Utilities and Public Transportation
47. Retirement and Pensions
48. Revenue and Taxation
49. Social Services
50. State Government
51. Torts
52. Waters of the State, Ports, and Watercraft
53. Wills, Trusts, and Administration of Estates

== See also ==
- Government of Georgia (U.S. state)
- Constitution of Georgia (U.S. state)
- Law of Georgia (U.S. state)
