= Kidd v. Pearson =

- Supreme Court of the United States

Argued April 4, 1888 Decided October 22, 1888
- Full case name: J. S. Kidd v. I. E. Pearson
- Citations: 128 U.S. 1 (more) 9 S. Ct. 6; 32 L. Ed. 346; 1888 U.S. LEXIS 2193

Case history
- Prior: Error to the Supreme Court of the State of Iowa
- Subsequent: None

Holding
- There is no conflict and the state law is valid. The Court erected a distinction between manufacture and commerce. The state law regulated manufacturing only. A broad view of commerce that embraces manufacturing would also embrace the power to regulate "every branch of human industry."

Court membership
- Chief Justice Melville Fuller Associate Justices Samuel F. Miller · Stephen J. Field; Joseph P. Bradley · John M. Harlan; Stanley Matthews · Horace Gray; Samuel Blatchford · Lucius Q. C. Lamar II

Case opinion
- Majority: Lamar, joined by Miller, Field, Bradley, Harlan, Matthews, Gray, Blatchford
- Fuller took no part in the consideration or decision of the case.

Kidd v. Pearson, 128 U.S. 1 (1888), was a case in which the Supreme Court of the United States held that a distinction between manufacturing and commerce meant that an Iowa law that prohibited the manufacture of alcohol (in this case for sale out-of-state) was constitutional as it did not conflict with the power of the US Congress to regulate interstate commerce.

== Background ==
In 1882, Iowa became a dry state with a passage of a state constitutional amendment. An Iowa state law supporting that prohibition made the manufacturing of liquor in Iowa illegal unless it was for mechanical, medicinal, culinary, and sacramental purposes. Nonetheless, the Polk County Board of Supervisors granted J. S. Kidd a license to operate a distillery in 1884 for other uses based on his intent to only sell the liquor outside the state of Iowa. When the state moved to close the distillery as a public nuisance, Kidd sued and argued it was outside of state jurisdiction as an exclusively interstate business under the Commerce Clause.

== Question before the Supreme Court ==
Is there a conflict between the power of Congress to regulate interstate commerce.

== Decision of the Court ==
The court ruled that there was not a conflict between Congress' power to regulate interstate commerce and the state law covering manufacturing within a given state. Therefore, the law was valid.

== See also ==
- List of United States Supreme Court cases, volume 128
- Varnum v. Brien, 763 N.W.2d 862 (Iowa 2009), another U.S. Supreme Court case from Polk County
