= Edward Chitty =

Edward Chitty (1804–1863) was an English legal reporter, judge in Jamaica, and conchologist.

== Life ==
The third son of Joseph Chitty the elder, he was called to the bar at Lincoln's Inn in 1829, and practised as an equity draughtsman. In 1840 he went to Jamaica, and was there for many years, during which he "took up the task of describing land snails from this Antillean island". He returned to England, and died at Walham Green on 28 September 1863.

== Works ==
He published a series of reports of cases in bankruptcy with Edward Deacon, beginning in 1833, and with Basil Montagu in 1839. Besides his share in Deacon & Chitty he was the author of:

- Chitty's Equity Index (1831), which reached a third edition in 1853, and a fourth in 1883;
- an Index to Common Law Reports (with Francis Forster) in 1841; and
- the Commercial and General Lawyer (2nd edit. 1839).

He also published the Fly-Fisher's Text Book (1841) under the pseudonym of Theophilus South. An illustrated version came out in 1845.

His Jamaican work on snails (on which he had also written with C.B.Adams) was published as On the Jamaican Cyclotus, and Descriptions of Twenty-one proposed New Species and Two New Varieties of that Subgenus from Jamaica and On Stoastomidae as a family and on seven proposed new genera, sixty-one new species,, and two new varieties from Jamaica. in 1857.
