= Wheaton v. Peters =

- Supreme Court of the United States

Decided March 19, 1834
- Full case name: Henry Wheaton and Robert Donaldson, Appellants v. Richard Peters and John Grigg
- Citations: 33 U.S. 591 (more) 8 Pet. 591; 8 L. Ed. 1055; 1834 U.S. LEXIS 619

Holding
- There is no common law copyright after a work's publication, and court reporters cannot hold copyrights on the cases compiled in the course of their work.

Court membership
- Chief Justice John Marshall Associate Justices William Johnson · Gabriel Duvall; Joseph Story · Smith Thompson; John McLean · Henry Baldwin

Case opinions
- Majority: McLean, joined by Marshall, Johnson, Duvall, Story
- Dissent: Thompson
- Dissent: Baldwin

Wheaton v. Peters, 33 U.S. (8 Pet.) 591 (1834), was the first United States Supreme Court ruling on copyright. The case upheld the power of Congress to make a grant of copyright protection subject to conditions and rejected the doctrine of a common law copyright in published works. The Court also declared that there could be no copyright in the Court's own judicial decisions.

== Facts ==
The case arose out of the printing of the Supreme Court's own opinions. Henry Wheaton, the third reporter of decisions, had compiled the opinions of the Court, complete with annotations and summaries of the arguments in Court. This was useful material but made the volumes of his reports costly and out of the reach of most lawyers. His successor as reporter, Richard Peters, in addition to publishing the current volumes of reports, had gone over his predecessor's work, eliminated the arguments of counsel and other material beyond the opinions themselves, and published an abridged edition reducing twenty-four volumes into six. The Reporter's salary of $1,000 per year did not cover the full expenses of preparing the reports, and the Reporters relied on sales of their books to recoup their costs. By creating more affordable volumes, Peters devastated the market for Wheaton's more expensive ones.

Wheaton sued Peters in Pennsylvania and lost in the circuit court. The judge, Joseph Hopkinson, ruled that copyright is purely the creation of statute and that one must comply with the formal requirements for copyright, such as registering the copyright and placing a copyright notice in the work, in order to receive protection. Judge Hopkinson also ruled that there was no federal common law; one must look to the states for common law; and even then, the states did not necessarily adopt the entire English common law if there even was a common law copyright.

Wheaton appealed to the Supreme Court.

== Result ==
Justice John McLean, who had publishing experience as the founder of an Ohio newspaper, wrote the opinion of the Court. It ruled that while the common law protected copyright in unpublished writings (such as diaries or personal letters), "this is a very different right from that which asserts a perpetual and exclusive property in the future publication of the work, after the author shall have published it to the world." McLean declared that post-publication copyright did not exist in the United States but only as a function of statute. "Congress, then, by this act, instead of sanctioning an existing right, as contended, created it." McLean also rejected Wheaton's contention that requiring registration and the deposit of a copy of the copyrighted work with the Department of State were improper prerequisites to copyright protection. Because Congress was granting authors the protection of copyright, it could require them to observe the statutory formalities. That precedent corresponded to the English decision in Donaldson v Beckett, which was cited in the Court's opinion.

The Court remanded the case to the circuit court to determine whether Wheaton had satisfied the requirements for copyright protection. Finally, in an often-quoted sentence, the opinion concluded: "It may be proper to remark that the Court is unanimously of opinion that no reporter has or can have any copyright in the written opinions delivered by this Court, and that the judges thereof cannot confer on any reporter any such right." Thus, any copyright protection for published judicial opinions could cover ancillary materials such as summaries of the opinions and commentaries on them but not the judicially-authored texts of the opinions themselves.

== Dissents ==
Justice Smith Thompson wrote a dissenting opinion in which he concluded that Wheaton was entitled to an injunction against Peters' publication of his reports.

Justice Henry Baldwin also dissented, but his reasoning was not recorded in the original opinion. It appeared in a revised edition of the U.S. Reports, published posthumously in 1884.

== Later developments ==
=== Case resolution ===
As the Supreme Court had directed, the Circuit Court for the Eastern District of Pennsylvania held a trial on the issue of whether Wheaton had satisfied the copyright formalities. The court ruled that he had. Peters appealed, but while the second appeal was pending, both Wheaton and Peters died. The case was then settled, with Peters' estate paying Wheaton's estate $400.

=== Legal history ===
Wheaton v. Peters was the first in a line of cases in which the Supreme Court traditionally tried to prevent people from monopolizing information by using copyright law, especially the text of the laws that govern everyone. The decision was upheld and expanded to all judicial opinions in Banks v. Manchester although Callaghan v. Myers established that editorial additions to the materials could be restricted by copyright.

== See also ==
- Government edicts doctrine
- List of leading legal cases in copyright law
- Open court principle
