= Treatise on the Law of the Prerogatives of the Crown =

British legal text

A Treatise on the Law of the Prerogatives of the Crown (full title: A Treatise on the Law of the Prerogatives of the Crown; and the Relative Duties and Rights of the Subject) is an 1820 legal text by the English jurist Joseph Chitty. The text provides the most comprehensive list of royal prerogative powers in the United Kingdom.
