= List of United States Supreme Court cases, volume 128 =

Supreme Court of the United States
- Interactive map of Supreme Court of the United States
- 38°53′26″N 77°00′16″W
- Established: March 4, 1789; 236 years ago
- Location: Washington, D.C.
- Coordinates: 38°53′26″N 77°00′16″W
- Composition method: Presidential nomination with Senate confirmation
- Authorised by: Constitution of the United States, Art. III, § 1
- Judge term length: life tenure, subject to impeachment and removal
- Number of positions: 9 (by statute)
- Website: supremecourt.gov

This is a list of cases reported in volume 128 of United States Reports, decided by the Supreme Court of the United States in 1888.

== Justices of the Supreme Court at the time of volume 128 U.S. ==
The Supreme Court is established by Article III, Section 1 of the Constitution of the United States, which says: "The judicial Power of the United States, shall be vested in one supreme Court . . .". The size of the Court is not specified; the Constitution leaves it to Congress to set the number of justices. Under the Judiciary Act of 1789 Congress originally fixed the number of justices at six (one chief justice and five associate justices). Since 1789 Congress has varied the size of the Court from six to seven, nine, ten, and back to nine justices (always including one chief justice).

When the cases in volume 128 U.S. were decided the Court comprised the following nine members:

Portrait	Justice	Office	Home State	Succeeded	Date confirmed by the Senate (Vote)	Tenure on Supreme Court
	Melville Fuller	Chief Justice	Illinois	Morrison Waite	July 20, 1888 (41–20)	October 8, 1888 – July 4, 1910 (Died)
	Samuel Freeman Miller	Associate Justice	Iowa	Peter Vivian Daniel	July 16, 1862 (Acclamation)	July 21, 1862 – October 13, 1890 (Died)
	Stephen Johnson Field	Associate Justice	California	newly created seat	March 10, 1863 (Acclamation)	May 10, 1863 – December 1, 1897 (Retired)
	Joseph P. Bradley	Associate Justice	New Jersey	newly created seat	March 21, 1870 (46–9)	March 23, 1870 – January 22, 1892 (Died)
	John Marshall Harlan	Associate Justice	Kentucky	David Davis	November 29, 1877 (Acclamation)	December 10, 1877 – October 14, 1911 (Died)
	Stanley Matthews	Associate Justice	Ohio	Noah Haynes Swayne	May 12, 1881 (24–23)	May 17, 1881 – March 22, 1889 (Died)
	Horace Gray	Associate Justice	Massachusetts	Nathan Clifford	December 20, 1881 (51–5)	January 9, 1882 – September 15, 1902 (Died)
	Samuel Blatchford	Associate Justice	New York	Ward Hunt	March 22, 1882 (Acclamation)	April 3, 1882 – July 7, 1893 (Died)
	Lucius Quintus Cincinnatus Lamar	Associate Justice	Mississippi	William Burnham Woods	January 16, 1888 (32–28)	January 18, 1888 – January 23, 1893 (Died)

== Citation style ==
Under the Judiciary Act of 1789 the federal court structure at the time comprised District Courts, which had general trial jurisdiction; Circuit Courts, which had mixed trial and appellate (from the US District Courts) jurisdiction; and the United States Supreme Court, which had appellate jurisdiction over the federal District and Circuit courts—and for certain issues over state courts. The Supreme Court also had limited original jurisdiction (i.e., in which cases could be filed directly with the Supreme Court without first having been heard by a lower federal or state court). There were one or more federal District Courts and/or Circuit Courts in each state, territory, or other geographical region.

Bluebook citation style is used for case names, citations, and jurisdictions.

- "C.C.D." = United States Circuit Court for the District of . . .
  - e.g.,"C.C.D.N.J." = United States Circuit Court for the District of New Jersey
- "D." = United States District Court for the District of . . .
  - e.g.,"D. Mass." = United States District Court for the District of Massachusetts
- "E." = Eastern; "M." = Middle; "N." = Northern; "S." = Southern; "W." = Western
  - e.g.,"C.C.S.D.N.Y." = United States Circuit Court for the Southern District of New York
  - e.g.,"M.D. Ala." = United States District Court for the Middle District of Alabama
- "Ct. Cl." = United States Court of Claims
- The abbreviation of a state's name alone indicates the highest appellate court in that state's judiciary at the time.
  - e.g.,"Pa." = Supreme Court of Pennsylvania
  - e.g.,"Me." = Supreme Judicial Court of Maine

== List of cases in volume 128 U.S. ==
Case Name	Page & year	Opinion of the Court	Concurring opinion(s)	Dissenting opinion(s)	Lower Court	Disposition
Kidd v. Pearson	1 (1888)	Lamar	none	none	Iowa	affirmed
Leather M. Nat'l Bank v. Merchants' Nat'l Bank	26 (1888)	Gray	none	none	C.C.S.D.N.Y.	reversed
Western Union T. Co. v. Pennsylvania	39 (1888)	Fuller	none	none	Pa.	reversed
United States ex rel. Dunlap v. Black	40 (1888)	Bradley	none	none	Sup. Ct. D.C.	affirmed
Robinson v. Fair	53 (1888)	Harlan	none	none	C.C.D. Cal.	affirmed
Kane v. Northern C. Ry. Co.	91 (1888)	Harlan	none	none	C.C.E.D. Pa.	reversed
Nashville et al. Ry. Co. v. Alabama	96 (1888)	Field	none	none	Ala.	affirmed
Livingston Cnty. v. First Nat'l Bank	102 (1888)	Blatchford	none	none	C.C.W.D. Mo.	affirmed
Asher v. Texas	129 (1888)	Bradley	none	none	Tex. Civ. App.	reversed
Chappell v. Bradshaw	132 (1888)	Fuller	none	none	Md.	dismissed
Culliford v. Gomila & Co.	135 (1888)	Blatchford	none	none	C.C.E.D. La.	reversed
Crescent B. Co v. Gottfried	158 (1888)	Blatchford	none	none	C.C.D. Ind.	reversed
Gaff v. Gottfried	170 (1888)	Blatchford	none	none	C.C.D. Ind.	reversed
Lovejoy v. United States	171 (1888)	Gray	none	none	C.C.D. Neb.	affirmed
Georgia et al. Co. v. Smith	174 (1888)	Field	none	none	Ga.	affirmed
Liggett et al. Co. v. Finzer	182 (1888)	Field	none	none	C.C.D. Ky.	affirmed
Though both marks feature stars, the marks are so different that there is no possibility of misleading consumers.
Bundy v. Cocke	185 (1888)	Blatchford	none	none	C.C.D. Ky.	reversed
Jaehne v. People	189 (1888)	Fuller	none	none	C.C.S.D.N.Y.	affirmed
Central Nat'l Bank v. Hume	195 (1888)	Fuller	none	none	Sup. Ct. D.C.	multiple
Ridings v. Johnson	212 (1888)	Bradley	none	none	C.C.E.D. La.	reversed
Estis D. & Co. v. Trabue D. & Co.	225 (1888)	Blatchford	none	none	N.D. Miss.	dismissed
United States v. Knox	230 (1888)	Miller	none	none	Ct. Cl.	affirmed
Brodnax v. Aetna Ins. Co.	236 (1888)	Fuller	none	none	C.C.S.D. Ga.	affirmed
Banks v. Manchester	244 (1888)	Blatchford	none	none	C.C.S.D. Ohio	affirmed
United States v. Cook	254 (1888)	Bradley	none	none	Ct. Cl.	affirmed
Credit Co., Ltd. v. Arkansas C. Ry. Co.	258 (1888)	Bradley	none	none	C.C.E.D. Ark.	dismissed
United States v. Palmer	262 (1888)	Bradley	none	none	Ct. Cl.	affirmed
Means v. Dowd	273 (1888)	Miller	none	none	C.C.W.D.N.C.	reversed
Ex parte Terry	289 (1888)	Harlan	none	none	C.C.N.D. Cal.	habeas corpus denied
United States v. American B.T. Co.	315 (1888)	Miller	none	none	C.C.D. Mass.	reversed
Johnson v. Christian	374 (1888)	Lamar	none	none	C.C.E.D. Ark.	affirmed
Stewart v. Wyoming C.R. Co.	383 (1888)	Gray	none	none	C.C.D. Neb.	affirmed
Cogswell v. Fordyce	391 (1888)	Harlan	none	none	C.C.E.D. Ark.	dismissed
United States v. De Walt	393 (1888)	Fuller	none	none	D. Terr. Wyo.	affirmed
Pacific P.T.C. Co. v. O'Connor	394 (1888)	Fuller	none	none	C.C.N.D. Cal.	dismissed
Clark v. Pennsylvania	395 (1888)	Fuller	none	none	Pa. Ct. Q. Sess.	dismissed
United States v. Reisinger	398 (1888)	Lamar	none	none	C.C.W.D. Pa.	certification
Brown v. Guarantee et al. Co.	403 (1888)	Lamar	none	none	C.C.N.D. Ill.	affirmed
Wood v. Guarantee et al. Co.	416 (1888)	Lamar	none	none	C.C.N.D. Ill.	affirmed
Fire Ins. Ass'n, Ltd. v. Wickham	426 (1888)	Bradley	none	none	C.C.E.D. Mich.	dismissal denied
United States v. Foster	435 (1888)	Harlan	none	none	Ct. Cl.	reversed
Hennessey v. Woolworth	438 (1888)	Harlan	none	none	C.C.D. Minn.	affirmed
Jones v. East et al. Ry. Co.	443 (1888)	Miller	none	none	C.C.E.D. Tenn.	reversed
Pollak & Co. v. Brush E. Ass'n	446 (1888)	Harlan	none	none	C.C.M.D. Ala.	affirmed
Cornelius v. Kessel	456 (1888)	Field	none	none	Wis.	affirmed
Hunt v. Blackburn	464 (1888)	Fuller	none	none	C.C.E.D. Ark.	reversed
United States v. McDonald	471 (1888)	Lamar	none	none	Ct. Cl.	affirmed
The Gazelle	474 (1888)	Gray	none	none	C.C.D. Md.	affirmed
Quimby v. Boyd	488 (1888)	Fuller	none	none	Colo.	dismissed
Denny v. Bennett	489 (1888)	Miller	none	Harlan	Minn.	affirmed
Town of Danville v. Brown	503 (1888)	Fuller	none	none	C.C.D.W. Va.	vacation denied
Farmers' F. Mfg. Co. v. Challenge C.P. Co.	506 (1888)	Gray	none	none	C.C.W.D. Mich.	affirmed
Dublin Twp. v. Milford et al. Inst.	510 (1888)	Gray	none	none	C.C.N.D. Ohio	dismissed
Menendez & Bro. v. Holt & Co.	514 (1888)	Fuller	none	none	C.C.S.D.N.Y.	affirmed
Ryder v. Holt	525 (1888)	Fuller	none	none	C.C.S.D.N.Y.	reversed
German S. Bank v. Franklin Cnty.	526 (1888)	Blatchford	none	none	C.C.S.D. Ill.	affirmed
In re Chateaugay et al. Co.	544 (1888)	Blatchford	none	none	C.C.S.D.N.Y.	mandamus granted
Purdy v. Town of Lansing	557 (1888)	Harlan	none	none	C.C.N.D.N.Y.	affirmed
Glasgow v. Baker	560 (1888)	Miller	none	none	Mo.	affirmed
Walston v. Nevin	578 (1888)	Fuller	none	none	Ky.	affirmed
Means v. Dowd	583 (1888)	per curiam	none	none	C.C.W.D.N.C.	mandate denied
Hoyt's Adm'r v. Hanbury	584 (1888)	Gray	none	none	C.C.N.D. Ill.	affirmed
Metcalf v. City of Watertown	586 (1888)	Harlan	none	none	C.C.W.D. Wis.	reversed
Ware v. Allen	590 (1888)	Miller	none	none	C.C.S.D. Miss.	affirmed
Goodyear's et al. Co. v. Goodyear R. Co.	598 (1888)	Field	none	none	C.C.S.D.N.Y.	reversed
Marsh v. Nichols et al. Co.	605 (1888)	Field	none	none	C.C.E.D. Mich.	affirmed
Callaghan v. Myers	617 (1888)	Blatchford	none	none	C.C.N.D. Ill.	multiple
Kennedy v. Hazelton	667 (1888)	Gray	none	none	C.C.N.D. Ill.	affirmed
United States v. Iron S.M. Co.	673 (1888)	Field	none	none	C.C.D. Colo.	affirmed
M. Stachelberg & Co. v. Ponce	686 (1888)	Harlan	none	none	C.C.D. Me.	affirmed
Cragin v. Powell	691 (1888)	Lamar	none	none	C.C.E.D. La.	reversed
