= United States copyright law in the performing arts =

As with any other idea, the idea for a performing arts production is copyrighted as soon as it is created. In order for any of these works to be performed, the proper licenses must be obtained. The only exception to this rule is with the case of works already in the public domain. This includes, for example, the works of William Shakespeare. Whether a work is in the public domain or not depends on the date it was created. If the work is not in the public domain, a license must be obtained to perform it. In many cases, the license for a Broadway production is called an option.

== Options ==
For a producer to put on a Broadway production, he or she must acquire an option, which involves paying a fee. The option is to make sure that the producer is serious about producing this show, and puts the money forth to prove it. For a typical Broadway play, a producer pays $5,000, therefore getting the rights for the first six months. He or she can then pay $2,500 to renew the option for the next six months, and then $5,500 for anywhere up to twelve months after. Sometimes the third renewal requires that the producer has a director, star, or theatre attached to the production. This is all to make sure that the producer is serious about producing this play or musical.

Usually, a Broadway production option gives the producer first-class rights. This typically means a production in New York and possibly London. It can also include a first-class touring production. Other rights, such as rights to perform the work in other places around the world, are not included in first-class rights. It is also possible to get commercial use rights, which would give the producer rights to cast albums and merchandise that comes from the production. Subsidiary rights can also be negotiated. If a producer holds part of an author's subsidiary rights, this would mean the producer would have a share in the profits from all amateur productions, television versions, or movie versions of this production. These rights typically only last for a certain period of time that is negotiated.

The rights must be obtained for all parts a production. For example, for a musical, the rights must be obtained for the book, lyrics, and music.

A producer can also hire a writer to create a work. This could be defined as a Work for hire. If the work is a work for hire, the copyright of the material would be given to the producer of the show, not the writer. Whether or not a work is a work for hire is defined in the contract.

In many cases, the rights to any or all of these parts of a musical or play are distributed by various companies that monitor and represent the rights of the artists. Instead of dealing with the artist directly, these companies monitor the artists' rights.

== Obtaining rights ==
There are a few companies that represent artists and their copyrights. These companies make sure that the original artist gets credit and payment for the use of his or her work. Here are a few examples:

ASCAP is the American Society of Composers, Authors and Publishers. They represent composers, songwriters, and lyricists. BMI (Broadcast Music, Inc.) also represent songwriters and composers. The Rodgers and Hammerstein Organization represent the authors and rights holders of many theatrical productions.

Some of these companies do not license dramatic performances of works, and some do. A dramatic performance of a work can be anywhere from a performance of an entire dramatic work, such as a musical, or a concert of a few of an artist's songs. ASCAP does not license dramatic performances, but The Rodgers and Hammerstein Organization does. An example of a non-dramatic work would be if a song from a musical were to be played on the radio.

== Artist copyright ==
If the production is not a work for hire, many of the artists involved have copyrights once the production is complete. For example, the choreographer's work is copyrighted. According to the U.S. Copyright Office, in order for choreography to be protected under copyright, it needs to be "fixed in a tangible medium of expression from which the work can be performed." In a typical musical, this would make the choreographer's work copyrighted. This means that his or her copyrighted dance routine cannot be used again without his or her permission and payment.

While actors do not have copyright over the words they say or the moves they do, they do have the right to prohibit the recording or broadcasting of their performances. They also have the right to have their name associated with the part they played.

There is some controversy over whether or not a director has copyright over his or her directorial services in a play or musical. There has been no official decision on this matter.

== Recent copyright issues ==
When obtaining rights to a play or musical, it is also a good idea to make sure the chain of title is intact. This means if the musical or play is based on a book, it is important that the rights to the book have been acquired before the musical or play can be produced on Broadway or in London.

In 2010, this became a problem in the Broadway production of the musical Fela!. Carlos Moore is said to be the only official biographer of Fela Anikulapo Kuti. The musical, first produced Off-Broadway, then on Broadway, and then in London, details Fela's life using many of his songs. Carlos Moore claimed that the producers of the musical used his biography but did not credit him or give him any compensation for the use of his copyrighted work. He filed a $5 million suit for his belief of infringement.

The producers of the production said that Carlos Moore knew about the show when it was Off-Broadway, and even participated in interviews about the show. They therefore did not understand his lawsuit years after he became knowledgeable about the show.
