= Capitol Records, Inc. v. Naxos of America, Inc. =

US copyright legal case

- Court: New York Court of Appeals
- Full case name: Capitol Records, Inc. v. Naxos of America, Inc.
- Decided: April 5, 2005
- Citations: 4 N.Y.3d 540; 797 N.Y.S.2d 352; 830 N.E.2d 250; 74 U.S.P.Q.2d 1331

Case history
- Prior actions: Summary judgment granted, 262 F. Supp. 2d 204, 274 F. Supp. 2d 472 (S.D.N.Y. 2003); question certified, 372 F.3d 471 (2d Cir. 2004).

Court membership
- Judges sitting: Judith S. Kaye, George Bundy Smith, Carmen Beauchamp Ciparick, Albert Rosenblatt, Victoria A. Graffeo, Susan Phillips Read, Robert S. Smith

Case opinions
- Decision by: Graffeo

Capitol Records, Inc. v. Naxos of America, Inc., 4 N.Y.3d 540 (2005), is one of "the most notable case[s]" concerning the copyright status of US-published sound recordings issued before February 15, 1972 (frequently called "pre-1972 sound recordings"). In this case, the New York Court of Appeals held that pre-1972 sound recordings, which are not given copyright under U.S. federal law, may be covered under state common law copyright.

== Background ==
Naxos Records restored and issued on CD a number of mid-20th century sound recordings, including several classical music performances by Pablo Casals, Edwin Fischer, and Yehudi Menuhin. Capitol Records, which held the U.S. licenses for those works, also remastered and reissued on CD the same recordings.

== Case ==
Capitol sued Naxos in the Southern District of New York, which held that because the items were in the public domain in their country of origin (the United Kingdom), they were also in the public domain in the US. On appeal, the Second Circuit held that while federal copyright protection was not available, the state of New York may or may not have common law copyright. The Second Circuit certified the question to the state of New York, which considered several questions, including the question of whether a state's common law copyright protection might survive the expiration of a work's copyright in its country of origin.

The New York Court of Appeals held that, because Congress had not preempted common law copyright for pre-1972 sound recordings, that common law copyright was available. Because common law copyright was not bound by federal and international rules regarding expiration into the public domain, Capitol's claim survived.

The case was hailed in some quarters, and critiqued in others, but most commentators acknowledged that it was a "landmark", and "groundbreaking" decision, carrying significance for both music preservation and commercialization of recordings before 1972.

On December 20, 2016, the New York Court of Appeals ruled that this common-law right includes only the exclusive right to duplication and publication, and not to public performance. That case, Flo & Eddie, Inc. v. Sirius XM Radio, ruled that no such common law right to public performance existed in New York.
