= Joseph Chitty =

English lawyer and writer (1776–1841)

Joseph Chitty (12 March 1776 – 17 February 1841) was an English lawyer and legal writer who was author of some of the earliest practitioners' texts and founder of an important dynasty of lawyers.

== Life and practice ==
He was himself the son of a Joseph Chitty (1729–1795), and his wife, Sarah (née Cartwright). He initially practised as a special pleader but was called to the bar by the Middle Temple on 28 June 1816. He never became a King's Counsel but built a huge junior practice at 1 Pump Court and published many books.

Chitty was also pupil master to a generation of lawyers, including:

- John Walter Hulme, his co-author and son-in-law and the first Chief Justice of Hong Kong
- Thomas Starkie
- Edward Hall Alderson
- Thomas Noon Talfourd
- Henry Havelock.

In fact, at the time, the Inns of Court were in decline, and Chitty organised lectures and moots and in 1810 was given permission to use the hall of Lincoln's Inn.

== Personality and later life ==
Despite his successful practice, Chitty had by 1831 amassed extensive debts that were costing almost £2,000 per year to service. Further, Chitty's health was in decline, and he was becoming increasingly anxious about his parlous state. Much of his energy became taken up in avoiding the attentions of his creditors. He retired from practice in 1833 but continued to publish. He died in London and was buried in Kensal Green Cemetery.

== Family ==
He married Elizabeth Woodward, and they had eight children, of whom Joseph Chitty the Younger, Thomas Chitty, Edward Chitty, and Thompson Chitty were lawyers and legal writers:

Joseph the Younger and Thompson were the first editors of the standard textbook Chitty on Contracts.

Judge Joseph William Chitty was a grandson, a son of Thomas Chitty.

== Bibliography ==
=== By Chitty ===
- Chitty, T. (1799) Treatise on Bills of Exchange
- — (1808) Precedents of Pleading
- — (1811a) Treatise on the Law of Apprentices
- — (1811b) Treatise on the Game Laws
- — (1812) Treatise on the Law of Nations
- — (1818) Treatise on Commercial Law
- — (1820) Treatise on the Law of the Prerogatives of the Crown
- — (1826) A Practical Treatise on the Criminal Law
- — (1829–37) Statutes of Practical Utility
- — (1833) The Practice of the Law in All its Principal Departments
