= Common law copyright =

Postulated right

Common law copyright is the legal doctrine that grants copyright protection based on common law of various jurisdictions, rather than through protection of statutory law.

In part, it is based on the contention that copyright is a natural right, so creators are entitled to the same protections anyone would have in regard to tangible and real property.

The "natural right" aspect of the doctrine was addressed by the courts in the United Kingdom (Donaldson v. Beckett, 1774) and the United States (Wheaton v. Peters, 1834). In both countries, the courts found that copyright is a limited right under statutes and subject to the conditions and terms the legislature sees fit to impose. The decision in the UK did not, however, directly rule on whether copyright was a common-law right.

In the United States, common law copyright also refers to state-level copyrights. These are ordinarily preempted by federal copyright law, but for some categories of works, common law (state) copyright may be available. For instance, in the New York State 2005 case, Capitol Records v. Naxos of America, the court held that pre-1972 sound recordings, which do not receive federal copyrights, may nevertheless receive state common law copyrights, a ruling that was clarified and limited with 2016's Flo & Eddie v. Sirius XM Radio.

== Battle of the booksellers (UK) ==
Until the enactment of the Statute of Anne publishers could pass on their royal grants of copyright to their heirs in perpetuity. The Battle of the Booksellers took place between the 1740s to 1770s through the United Kingdom. The dispute was over common law.

When Donaldson v Beckett reached the House of Lords in 1774, Lord Camden, said "all our learning will be locked up in the hands of the Tonsons and the Lintots of the age". He declared that "as odious and as selfish as any other, it deserves as much reprobation, and will become as intolerable. Knowledge and science are not things to be bound in such cobweb chains." The support was from Thomas Lyttelton. The House of Lords ultimately ruled that copyright in published works was subject to the durational limits of the statute. The reasoning behind the decision is disputed, though most scholars agree that the House did not rule against common-law copyright.

The Lords agreed that an author had a pre-existing right "to dispose of his manuscript ... until he parts with it" (Lord Chief Justice De Grey), but that prior to the Statute of Anne the right to copy was "founded on patents, privileges, Star Chamber Decrees and the bylaws of the Stationers' Company" (Lord Camden). In any event, they determined, the Statute of Anne superseded any common law rights of the author which may have existed prior to the statute. The previous entry here maintained that the Lords found that "parliament had limited these natural rights in order to strike a more appropriate balance between the interests of the author and the wider social good," quoting Ronan. However, the use of the phrase "natural rights" is not justified by the historical record. Lord Chief Baron Smythe stated that the Statute of Anne was "a compromise between authors and printers contending for a perpetuity, and those who denied them any statute right," but the Lords in no way accepted that such a common law or 'natural' right of the author in perpetuity ever existed or developed. Lord Chief Justice De Grey saw no evidence of any such right in the courts in the 300 years since the invention of the printing press and charged that "the idea of a common-law right [of the author] in perpetuity was not taken up till after that failure in procuring a new statute for an enlargement of the term."

== State law copyright claims ==
Common law copyright is also the term used in the United States to refer to most state law copyright claims. In 1978, Section 301 took effect, preempting all state common law copyright claims that fall under subject matter in Section 102 (Subject matter of copyright: In general) or Section 103 (Subject matter of copyright: Compilations and derivative works) except for sound recordings fixed before February 15, 1972. This leaves a sizable amount of work that still falls under a mixture of state statutes and common law copyright.

Most state-law copyright claims are preempted by federal copyright law, but for some categories of works, common law (state) copyright may be available. For instance, in the New York State 2005 case, Capitol Records v. Naxos of America, the court held that pre-1972 sound recordings, which do not receive federal copyrights, may nevertheless receive state common law copyrights. This precedent was partially overruled in 2016 in Flo & Eddie, Inc. v. Sirius XM Radio, which determined that the extent of common law copyright in New York did not cover the performance of a sound recording.

Major changes to the federal laws of copyright for pre-1972 sound recordings were made in the 2018 enactment of the Music Modernization Act, including the CLASSICS Act. Such works are now covered by federal copyright law. Federal preemption over the state common law (and conflicting state statutes) implies that federal copyright for those works will now have definite scope and duration, as specified in the federal statutes. Potentially non-preempted common law rights may remain to be identified and addressed as further rulings unfold under the new statute.

== See also ==
- Copyright Act of 1909
- Gyles v Wilcox
- Berne Convention
