= Public.Resource.Org =

U.S. nonprofit organization

- Public.Resource.Org
- Founder: Carl Malamud
- Type: 501(c)(3), charitable organization
- Tax ID no.: 20-8842127
- Website: public.resource.org

Public.Resource.Org (PRO) is a 501(c)(3) non-profit corporation dedicated to publishing and sharing public domain materials in the United States and internationally. It was founded by Carl Malamud and is based in Sebastopol, California.

Public.Resource.Org takes particular interest in digitizing and making accessible the works of the United States Federal Government, which because of US government licensing rules for its own work are almost always in the public domain. Major projects conducted by the organization include the digitizing and sharing of large numbers of court records, US government-produced video, and laws of various places.

== Operation strategy ==
Malamud works on the premise that information in the public domain, and particularly government-generated information of this sort, ought to be as easy as possible for the public to access. In doing this, he identifies interesting collections of information held by organizations which have failed to grant free public access to it. Two typical circumstances are that the creator of the information has failed to make it available online in any form, or that the creator has provided the information to a private company which itself charges fees for access to the information. At this point, Malamud acquires the free information himself, publishes it in public.resource.org as a free communication channel, and then demonstrates publicly that he has made information free when otherwise it would not be and calls for pressure on the holder of the information to collaborate in developing the information release.

== Projects ==
=== Access to IRS Form 990 in digital format ===
In 2013, Public.Resource.Org filed a Freedom of Information Act request with the Internal Revenue Service (IRS) requesting copies of nine annual information reports (Form 990, Return of Organization Exempt from Income Tax) in digital format for tax-exempt entities in MeF (modernized e-file) format. The IRS refused to provide the MeF files, claiming that the effort to edit them to conform to required privacy standards for the filers represented an unreasonable burden. On January 29, 2015, a U.S. District Court ruled against the IRS, requiring that the IRS provide the requested files within 60 days. Observers believe that this decision will result in the IRS moving more rapidly toward providing electronic versions of Form 990 to the public.

=== Access to United States legal resources ===
In 2007 Malamud began publishing the full text of United States legal opinions dating from 1880 in an effort to begin a process intended to create a free publicly accessible database intended to hold the entirety of US Case law. Goals of the project included the creation of "an unencumbered full-text repository of the Federal Reporter, the Federal Supplement, and the Federal Appendix" and "an unencumbered full-text repository of all state and federal cases and codes." In describing this project, journalist Tim O'Reilly described this information to be "clearly public data" yet also "the crown jewels of public data available for profit", as companies including West had collected billions of dollars in fees for granting access to this data.

Malamud called for increased awareness that Westlaw was a commercial broker of the United States Federal Reporter, Federal Supplement, and Federal Appendix. While Westlaw had been adding value to the content by indexing it with their proprietary West American Digest System and accompanying summaries, the purchase of their products was the only way to access much of the public domain material they hosted. Malamud began to distribute these materials for free while saying in an open letter to the company

... it seems fairly clear that a large part of the publication stream is tightly interwoven into the very substance of the operation of the courts, with West serving as the either contractual or de-facto sole vendor reporting on behalf of the court. ... You have already received rich rewards for the initial publication of these documents ... We wish to make this information available to (the public) ... It is crucial that the public domain data be available for anybody to build upon.

In 2010 Google awarded the project US$2 million in funding through their Project 10^100 challenge to submit ideas for changing the world.

=== FedFlix ===
Public.Resource.Org collects old and forgotten United States government video, digitizes it, and distributes it for free online in a project called FedFlix. Video is purchased or requested from government agencies such as the National Technical Information Service. These videos are digitized and uploaded with metadata to YouTube and Public.Resource.Org's servers. Most of these videos were produced with federal government funding and intended for educational purposes. There is also a collection of videos from FedFlix at the Internet Archive which contains over 8,700 items.

YouTube's Content ID tool helps copyright holders make requests to remove their copyrighted videos from YouTube. Malamud has complained that large media organizations are using this tool to unfairly attack and call for the removal of Public.Resource.Org's upload of US federal government videos on the improper claim of their copyright over them, when in fact these works are purported by the US government to be public domain works.

=== Yes We Scan ===
"Yes We Scan" is a phrase used as a name for various Public.Resource.Org projects which have the goal of digitizing and making available large collections of documents.

In 2009 when Carl Malamud petitioned to become the Public Printer of the United States the campaign slogan was "Yes we scan!"

In 2011 Public.Resource.org submitted a "YesWeScan.org" proposal to the United States federal government petitioning system We the People asking for the creation of a plan to scan all public federal government holdings. David Ferriero responded to the petition describing efforts to increase availability of government archives.

In 2013 Public.Resource.Org organized a fundraiser for a Yes We Scan project to collect, digitize, and make available all government safety standards in every country. In 2010 Public.Resource.Org managed a smaller project to free the public safety codes in California in the United States.

=== C-SPAN video licensing ===
In 2007 Malamud petitioned for more open access to some C-SPAN recordings.

C-SPAN is a private media company which records and broadcasts the discussions of the United States Congress. The company's business model is to provide its recordings for fees to cable and satellite television broadcasters.

In February 2007, Nancy Pelosi was publishing on her blog as Speaker of the United States House of Representatives and inserted video clips from C-SPAN into her messages. Persons representing her opposing political party claimed that she was violating copyright in using the videos. C-SPAN investigated the situation and found that in some cases she was and in other cases she was not, and they clarified their position in the media.

C-SPAN confirmed that through more than 25 years of operating it had consistently asserted its copyright over all of the material which it created with its own cameras, which was 85-95% of its content. The rest of its content was produced on the House and Senate floors with government cameras, and this material was in fact public domain content as a work of the US federal government. A representative of C-SPAN said that "It is perfectly understandable to me that people would be confused ... (because the situation is that) when a congressman says something on the floor it is public domain, but (when) he walks down the street to a committee hearing or give a speech and (then) it is not public domain. The representative went on to say that "I think a lot of people don't understand (that) C-SPAN is a business, just like CNN is, ... (and) If we don't have a revenue stream, we wouldn't have six crews ready to cover Congressional hearings."

In 2007 Malamud petitioned for more open access to some C-SPAN recordings. Electronic Frontier Foundation credited Malamud's efforts and a letter to Brian Lamb of C-SPAN to their agreement in 2007 to make congressional recordings much more accessible.

=== Smithsonian Institution protest ===
In 2006 Malamud complained that private company Showtime Networks and the publicly owned Smithsonian Institution were entering a contract to establish Smithsonian Networks without sufficient public disclosure. Under the contract Showtime would be able to deny permission to other media producers wishing access to Smithsonian collections. Documentarian Ken Burns said of this deal "I find this deal terrifying ... It feels like the Smithsonian has essentially optioned America's attic to one company".

=== Academic publishing ===
Public.Resource.org supports research to identify knowledge within the body of academic publications. A profile in 2019 reported that the organization had collaborated with Jawaharlal Nehru University and Sci-Hub to gather a collection of research literature for use in data mining. The project raised various ethical issues including the right to the public to share in knowledge versus the right of publishers to restrict access to their copyrighted works.

== Legal cases ==
=== American Society for Testing and Materials et al. v. Public.Resource.Org ===
In 2013, Public.Resource.Org was sued by the American Society for Testing and Materials, the National Fire Protection Association, and the American Society of Heating, Refrigerating and Air Conditioning Engineers for scanning and making available building codes and fire codes which these organizations consider their copyrighted property. The case was heard in the District Court of the District of Columbia, with Judge Tanya S. Chutkan presiding. Chutkan ruled against Public.Resource.Org and ordered Malamud to delete all the standards from the Internet. Public.Resource.Org appealed the case to the D.C. Circuit. A number of library and public interest associations weighed in supporting the position of Public.Resource.Org. In 2018, the D.C. Circuit reversed and remanded the decision, holding that the fair use doctrines had been improperly applied. In March 2022 Chutkan issued an opinion that would allow Public.Resource.Org to reproduce 184 standards under fair use, partially reproduce 1 standard, and deny reproduction of 32 standards that were found to differ in substantive ways from those incorporated by law. ASTM et al. appealed the case to the D.C. Circuit, which affirmed the trial court decision.

=== Georgia v. Public.Resource.Org ===
The Official Code of Georgia Annotated (OCGA) is the official law of Georgia. The Georgia government asserts that it holds the copyright to the OCGA; further, Georgia's legislature has exempted itself from the state's open records law. While the state claims that the OCGA is easily accessible, journalists for Atlanta news channel 11Alive were "unable to find a complete set of current law books at three branches of the Fulton County Public Library".

Malamud purchased a 186-volume hard copy of the OCGA and published the contents on Public.Resource.Org. The Code Revision Commission of the Georgia General Assembly sued PRO for copyright infringement, demanding that the OCGA be taken offline. A federal court in the United States District Court for the Northern District of Georgia ruled in favor of the state, writing that PRO did not "[meet] its burden of proving fair use". PRO immediately appealed. The United States Court of Appeals for the Eleventh Circuit unanimously struck down the previous ruling, finding that the OCGA is "intrinsically public domain material". The government of Georgia appealed to the Supreme Court. Both PRO and the state of Georgia urged the Supreme Court to grant certiorari to the government's appeal. The Supreme Court agreed to review the case (No. 18-1150). In 2020, the Court ruled 5–4 that the OCGA cannot be copyrighted.

== Responses ==
Ralph Nader endorses the work of the organization.

== See also ==
Right to repair
