= Callaghan v. Myers =

- Supreme Court of the United States

Argued November 8–9, 1888 Decided December 17, 1888
- Full case name: Callaghan v. Myers
- Citations: 128 U.S. 617 (more) 9 S. Ct. 177; 32 L. Ed. 547

Holding
- Arrangements of public domain records can represent copyrightable intellectual effort.

Court membership
- Chief Justice Melville Fuller Associate Justices Samuel F. Miller · Stephen J. Field; Joseph P. Bradley · John M. Harlan; Stanley Matthews · Horace Gray; Samuel Blatchford · Lucius Q. C. Lamar II

Case opinion
- Majority: Blatchford, joined by unanimous

Callaghan v. Myers, 128 U.S. 617 (1888), was a United States Supreme Court ruling dealing with copyright.

== Background ==
The firm of Eugene B. Myers & Chandler, composed of Myers and Horace P. Chandler, purchased the copyright of the arrangement of a number of Illinois Supreme Court records compiled by Norman L. Freeman. It printed those works as the Illinois Reports Volumes 32 to 38 from 1865 to 1867. Myers alone held the copyright to Freeman's arrangements of Volumes 39 to 46 and printed them as well.

The conflict began when Myers made some changes to the arrangement of Volumes 37 and 38 and published them by observing the procedure to procure copyright on these alternative works. The defendants, Callaghan & Company, offered to purchase licenses to publish the new versions of Volumes 37 and 38 but would not pay Myers's price. Instead, they made very minor changes to Myers's version, copied essentially verbatim the portions of the book that were actually copyrightable, and published it as their own work. Myers sued them for copyright infringement, and the case eventually went to the Supreme Court.

== Decision ==
The Court upheld earlier case law, such as Banks v. Manchester, which state that court documents belonged to the public domain. In regards to the case at hand, it ruled that the elements of the books that organized or summarized those judicial works constitute intellectual effort. Therefore, Myers held the copyright because he followed the copyrighting procedures in all cases except one. The Court found that the copies of Volume 32 that were required for formally copyrighting the work had arrived late and so that volume was not copyrighted. Nonetheless, the plaintiff, Myers, was entitled to compensation in full for the infringement damages if he chose to collect them.
