= Banks v. Manchester =

- Supreme Court of the United States

Submitted October 29, 1888 Decided November 19, 1888
- Full case name: Banks v. Manchester
- Citations: 128 U.S. 244 (more) 9 S. Ct. 36; 32 L. Ed. 425

Holding
- States cannot confer copyrights on public domain case records to citizens or to states themselves.

Court membership
- Chief Justice Melville Fuller Associate Justices Samuel F. Miller · Stephen J. Field; Joseph P. Bradley · John M. Harlan; Stanley Matthews · Horace Gray; Samuel Blatchford · Lucius Q. C. Lamar II

Case opinion
- Majority: Blatchford, joined by unanimous

Banks v. Manchester, 128 U.S. 244 (1888), was a United States Supreme Court ruling that dealt with copyright.

== Background ==
In 1882, to facilitate the printing of records of the Supreme Court of Ohio, the State of Ohio passed a resolution to establish a copyright held by the Supreme Court of Ohio's court reporter and advertised a contract for the lowest bidder to print copies of the records for Ohio in exchange for obtaining exclusive publishing rights for two years. H. W. Derby & Company won the bidding war and assigned all their right and interest in the contract to Banks & Brothers. Banks then contracted the Capital Printing and Publishing Company to print the books.

Banks proceeded to print various reports such as Bierce et al. v. Bierce et al. and The Scioto Valley Railway Company v. McCoy. Although for a time exclusive to Banks's publications, G. L. Manchester published the cases in the American Law Journal, a periodical. Banks sought to stop Manchester from printing the cases. Manchester refused because judges had authored the decisions and so he claimed that Banks did not have a copyright. Banks's position was that the state's copyright, which was held by court reporter E. L. De Witt and licensed to Banks & Brothers, afforded exclusivity.

== Decision ==
The Court ruled that the state could not hold a copyright and affirmed its decision in Wheaton v. Peters by stating "what a court or a judge thereof cannot confer on a reporter as the basis of a copyright in him, they cannot confer on any other person or on the state."
