= Copyright Renewal Act of 1992 =

United States copyright law

- Enacted by: the 102nd United States Congress

Citations
- Public law: Pub. L. 102–307
- Statutes at Large: 106 Stat. 264

Codification
- Acts amended: Copyright Act of 1976
- Titles amended: 17 (Copyrights)
- U.S.C. sections amended: 17 U.S.C. § 101, § 108, § 304, § 408, § 409

Legislative history
- Introduced in the Senate as S. 756 by Dennis DeConcini (D-AZ) on March 21, 1991; Committee consideration by United States Senate Committee on the Judiciary; Passed the Senate on November 25, 1991 (voice vote); Passed the House on June 4, 1992 (without objection); Signed into law by President George H. W. Bush on June 26, 1992

Copyright Renewal Act of 1992, Pub. L. 102–307, 106 Stat. 264, enacted June 26, 1992, is the first title of the Copyright Amendments Act of 1992, an act of the United States Congress that amended copyright renewal provisions of Title 17 of the United States Code enacted under Copyright Act of 1976. The act eliminated the previous requirements under US law that a second term of copyright protection is contingent on a renewal registration with the U.S. Copyright Office. It amended the Copyright Act of 1976.

== Renewal system prior to and following the 1992 amendment ==
Under the 1909 copyright, works copyrighted in the United States before January 1, 1978, were subject to a renewal system in which the term of copyright was divided into two consecutive terms. Strict time limits were imposed on renewal registration to secure the second term and extending copyright to the maximum length. Current copyright law is contained in title 17 of the United States Code. The Copyright Act of 1976 came into effect on January 1, 1978, and retained the renewal system for works that were copyrighted before 1978 and were still in their first terms on January 1, 1978. The statute, for these works, provides for a first term of copyright protection lasting 28 years, with the possibility for a second term of 47 years. This earlier system is also referred to as an "opt-in" system since authors would have to take the necessary steps required to claim the second term.

The 1992 amending legislation secures this second term for works copyrighted between January 1, 1964, and December 31, 1977, without a renewal registration requirement. This system has been referred to as an "opt-out" system because it provides for copyright protection even if it is not requested by the author of a work. However, if a copyright originally secured before January 1, 1964, was not renewed at the proper time, protection would have expired at the end of the 28th calendar year of the copyright.

Under the Copyright Term Extension Act of 1998 (Public Law 105-298) twenty more years were added to the second term for works copyrighted between January 1, 1964, and December 31, 1977. This made the total duration of copyright for these works 95 years.

== Benefits of filing copyright renewal application ==
The copyright office does not issue a renewal certificate, though renewal is secured automatically, unless the renewal application and fees are received and registered at the Copyright Office. The Copyright Office outlines the following benefits of filing a Copyright Renewal Application:

1. The renewal copyright is established in the name of the renewal claimant on the effective day of renewal registration. If the renewal registration was not made in the 28th year, the renewal copyright is secured by the party entitled to claim renewal by December 31 of the 28th year.
2. The Copyright Office issues a renewal certificate which acts as prima facie evidence of the validity of copyright during renewal and extended term.
3. The right to use derivative works in the extended period might be impacted by renewal registration.

However, in cases where no renewal registration was made, important benefits such as statutory damages and attorneys fees can still be secured by filing a renewal registration anytime during the renewal term.

== Eligibility to claim renewal ==
The law specifies the persons who are eligible to claim renewal copyright. Apart from anonymous works, the following are eligible to claim renewal:

1. The author, if living
2. The widow or widower of the author or the children or both, if the author is dead.
3. If there are no immediate family members, and there is a will, then the author's executors can claim renewal.
4. If there is no immediate family or will, the next of kin may claim the copyright.

A copyright proprietor or owner may claim renewal in only the following cases:

1. Posthumous work
2. Periodical, cyclopedic, or composite work
3. Work copyrighted by a corporate entity
4. Work made for hire.

== Music industry implications ==
Many critics viewed the Copyright Renewal Act of 1992, which was backed by the Recording Industry Association of America, as an attempt to prevent many songs from falling into the public domain because of procedural difficulties and mismanagement. In the past several authors had lost considerable royalties on their works because they were not aware of the renewal procedure; this act aimed to prohibit such instances from occurring.

A Billboard magazine article mentions the complaint of Jacqueline Byrd, widow of Robert Byrd, the songwriter who wrote “Little Bitty Pretty One”, a 1957 hit. Byrd was informed by the Copyright Office that they had not received the renewal application for the song, and hence they would be ending royalty payments. Had the song been renewed, Byrd and her four children would’ve received payments till 2037. This incident was used to convince lawmakers about the need for such an amendment.

== Reaction against the 1992 amendment ==
In 2007, four plaintiffs—the Internet Archive and its founder Brewster Kahle, and Prelinger Archives and its founder Rick Prelinger—filed the case Kahle v. Ashcroft in the Northern District of California, seeking a declaration that the Copyright Renewal Act was unconstitutional. The Internet Archive is a partner in the Million Book Project, a venture that aimed to scan over a million books to make it available to the public on the Internet. The plaintiffs argued that there are several cases where it is impossible to locate the authors. These orphan works could be used to contribute to projects that utilized public domain works. However, the 1992 amendment, by removing the renewal requirement of these works, prevented such works from falling into the public domain.

The district court dismissed the case. The Ninth Circuit Court of Appeals affirmed the dismissal on January 22, 2007, saying that they had essentially made the same arguments as made in the Eldred case, which had already been rejected by the United States Supreme Court.

== Other Titles of the Copyright Amendments Act of 1992 ==
=== National Film Preservation Act of 1992 ===
The National Film Preservation Act of 1992 was included in the Copyright Amendments Act of 1992 as Title II. This act replaced the previous National Film Preservation Act of 1988 and reauthorized the National Film Registry and the National Film Preservation Board of the Library of Congress until 1996 (four years after the date of enactment). It also included instructions for the Librarian of Congress.

=== Title III: Other Copyright Provisions ===
Title III of the Copyright Renewal Act of 1992 repealed the previous requirement that the Register of Copyrights report to Congress every five years regarding library and archives photocopying of copyrighted materials.

== See also ==
- Kahle v. Gonzales
- Copyright law of the United States
