= Intellectual property =

Ownership of creative expressions and processes

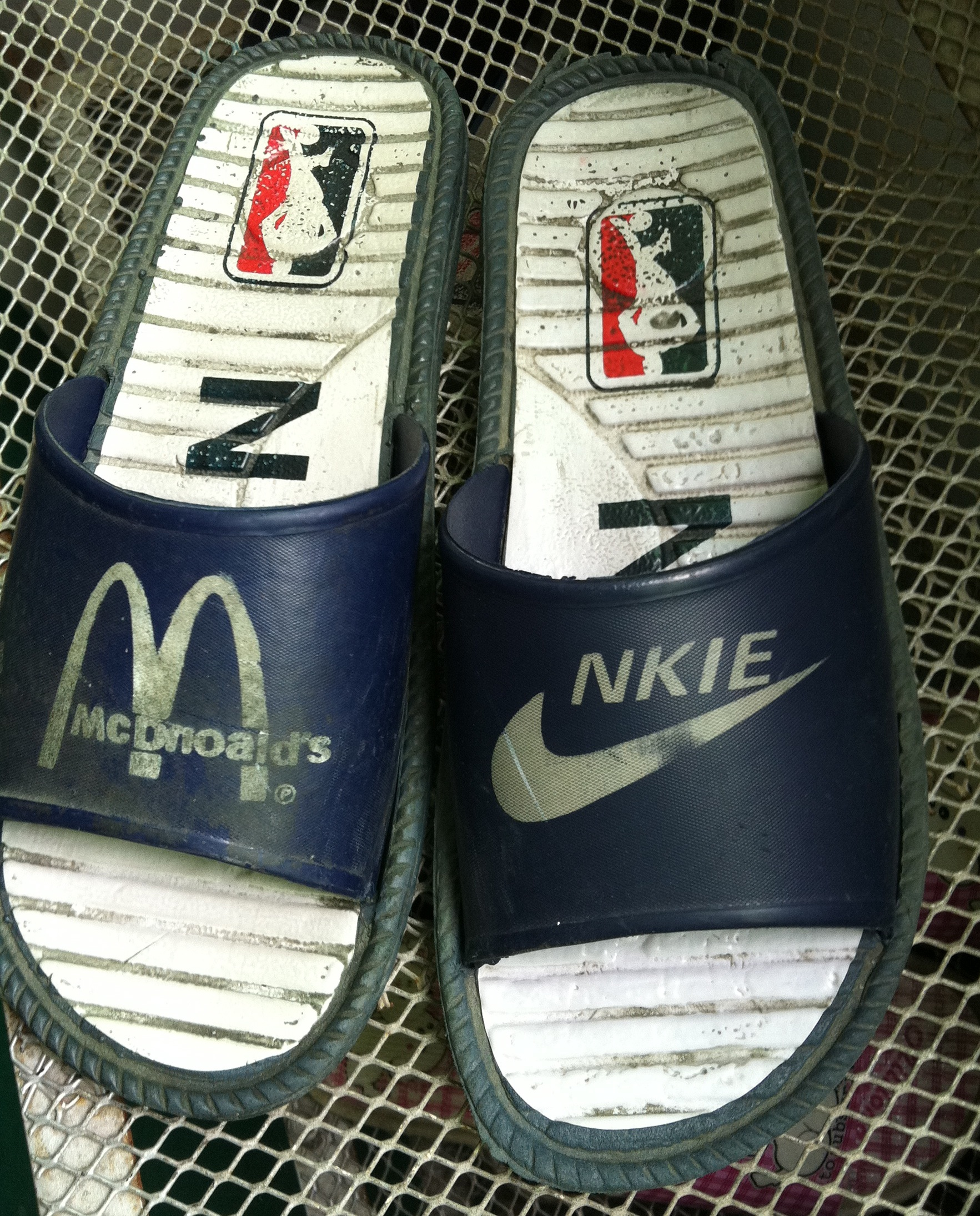
Intellectual property laws such as trademark laws forbid the sale of infringing goods like these "McDnoald's" [sic], "NKIE" [sic] and modified NBA logo sandals from China.

Intellectual property (IP) is a category of property that includes intangible creations of the human intellect, while intellectual property rights (IPR) are rights empowering the creator or owner of an intellectual property asset to use it and to prevent others from doing so.

There are many types of intellectual property, and some countries recognize more than others. The best-known types are patents, copyrights, trademarks, and trade secrets. The modern concept of intellectual property was developed in England in the 17th and 18th centuries. The term "intellectual property" began to be used in the 19th century, though it was not until the late 20th century that intellectual property became commonplace in most of the world's legal systems.

Supporters of intellectual property laws often describe their main purpose as encouraging the creation of a wide variety of intellectual goods. To achieve this, the law gives people and businesses property rights to certain information and intellectual goods they create, usually for a limited period of time. Supporters argue that because IP laws allow people to protect their original ideas and prevent unauthorized copying, creators derive greater individual economic benefit from the information and intellectual goods they create, and thus have more economic incentives to create them in the first place. Advocates of IP believe that these economic incentives and legal protections stimulate innovation and contribute to technological progress of certain kinds.

The intangible nature of intellectual property presents difficulties when compared with traditional property like land or goods. Unlike traditional property, intellectual property is "indivisible", since an unlimited number of people can in theory "consume" an intellectual good without its being depleted. Additionally, investments in intellectual goods suffer from appropriation problems: Landowners can surround their land with a robust fence and hire armed guards to protect it, but producers of information or literature can usually do little to stop their first buyer from replicating it and selling it at a lower price. Balancing rights so that they are strong enough to encourage the creation of intellectual goods but not so strong that they prevent the goods' wide use is the primary focus of modern intellectual property law.

== History ==
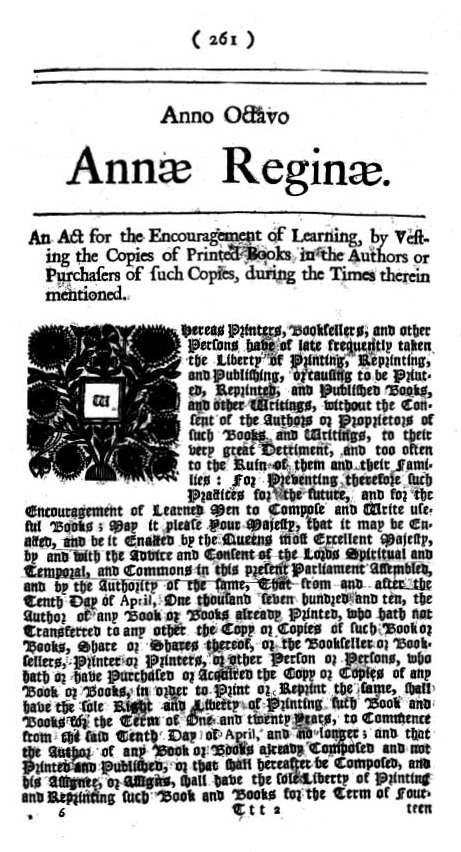
The Statute of Anne came into force in 1710.

The Venetian Patent Statute of 19 March 1474, established by the Republic of Venice, is usually considered to be the earliest codified patent system in the world. It states that patents might be granted for "any new and ingenious device, not previously made", provided it was useful. By and large, these principles still remain the basic principles of current patent laws. The Statute of Monopolies (1624) and the British Statute of Anne (1710) are seen as the origins of the current patent law and copyright respectively, firmly establishing the concept of intellectual property.

"Literary property" was the term predominantly used in the British legal debates of the 1760s and 1770s over the extent to which authors and publishers of works also had rights deriving from the common law of property (Millar v Taylor (1769), Hinton v Donaldson (1773), Donaldson v Becket (1774)). The first known use of the term intellectual property dates to this time, when a piece published in the Monthly Review in 1769 used the phrase. The first clear example of modern usage goes back as early as 1808, when it was used as a heading title in a collection of essays.

The German equivalent was used with the founding of the North German Confederation whose constitution granted legislative power over the protection of intellectual property (Schutz des geistigen Eigentums) to the confederation. When the administrative secretariats established by the Paris Convention (1883) and the Berne Convention (1886) merged in 1893, they located in Berne, and also adopted the term intellectual property in their new combined title, the United International Bureaux for the Protection of Intellectual Property.

The organization subsequently relocated to Geneva in 1960 and was succeeded in 1967 with the establishment of the World Intellectual Property Organization (WIPO) by treaty as an agency of the United Nations. According to legal scholar Mark Lemley, it was only at this point that the term really began to be used in the United States (which had not been a party to the Berne Convention), and it did not enter popular usage there until passage of the Bayh–Dole Act in 1980.

The history of patents does not begin with inventions, but rather with royal grants by Queen Elizabeth I (1558–1603) for monopoly privileges. Approximately 200 years after the end of Elizabeth's reign, however, a patent represents a legal right obtained by an inventor providing for exclusive control over the production and sale of his mechanical or scientific invention. demonstrating the evolution of patents from royal prerogative to common-law doctrine.

The term can be found used in an October 1845 Massachusetts Circuit Court ruling in the patent case Davoll et al. v. Brown, in which Justice Charles L. Woodbury wrote that "only in this way can we protect intellectual property, the labors of the mind, productions and interests are as much a man's own ... as the wheat he cultivates, or the flocks he rears." The statement that "discoveries are ... property" goes back earlier. Section 1 of the French law of 1791 stated, "All new discoveries are the property of the author; to assure the inventor the property and temporary enjoyment of his discovery, there shall be delivered to him a patent for five, ten or fifteen years." In Europe, French author A. Nion mentioned propriété intellectuelle in his Droits civils des auteurs, artistes et inventeurs, published in 1846.

Until the 2000s, the purpose of intellectual property law was to give as little protection as possible in order to encourage innovation. Historically, legal protection was therefore granted only when necessary to encourage invention, and it was limited in time and scope. This is mainly as a result of knowledge being traditionally viewed as a public good, in order to allow its extensive dissemination and improvement.

The concept's origin can potentially be traced back further. Jewish law includes several considerations whose effects are similar to those of modern intellectual property laws, though the notion of intellectual creations as property does not seem to exist—notably the principle of Hasagat Ge'vul (unfair encroachment) was used to justify limited-term publisher (but not author) copyright in the 16th century. In 500 BCE, the government of the Greek state of Sybaris offered one year's patent "to all who should discover any new refinement in luxury".

According to Jean-Frédéric Morin, "the global intellectual property regime is currently in the midst of a paradigm shift". Up until the early 2000s, the global IP regime used to be dominated by high standards of protection characteristic of IP laws from Europe or the United States, with a vision that uniform application of these standards over every country and to several fields with little consideration over social, cultural or environmental values or of the national level of economic development. Morin argues that "the emerging discourse of the global IP regime advocates for greater policy flexibility and greater access to knowledge, especially for developing countries". With the Development Agenda adopted by WIPO in 2007, a set of 45 recommendations to adjust WIPO's activities to the specific needs of developing countries and aim to reduce distortions especially on issues such as patients' access to medicines, Internet users' access to information, farmers' access to seeds, programmers' access to source codes or students' access to scientific articles. However, this paradigm shift has not yet manifested itself in concrete legal reforms at the international level.

Similarly, it is based on this background that the Trade-Related Aspects of Intellectual Property Rights (TRIPS) agreement requires members of the WTO to set minimum standards of legal protection, but its objective to have a "one-fits-all" protection law on Intellectual Property has been viewed with controversies regarding differences in the development level of countries. Despite the controversy, the agreement has extensively incorporated intellectual property rights into the global trading system for the first time in 1995, and has prevailed as the most comprehensive agreement reached by the world.

== Rights ==
Intellectual property rights include patents, copyright, industrial design rights, trademarks, plant variety rights, trade dress, geographical indications, and in some jurisdictions trade secrets. There are also more specialized or derived varieties of sui generis exclusive rights, such as circuit design rights (called mask work rights in the US), supplementary protection certificates for pharmaceutical products (after expiry of a patent protecting them), and database rights (in European law). The term "industrial property" is sometimes used to refer to a large subset of intellectual property rights including patents, trademarks, industrial designs, utility models, service marks, trade names, and geographical indications.

=== Patents ===
A patent is a form of right granted by the government to an inventor or their successor-in-title, giving the owner the right to exclude others from making, using, selling, offering to sell, and importing an invention for a limited period of time, in exchange for the public disclosure of the invention. An invention is a solution to a specific technological problem, which may be a product or a process, and generally has to fulfill three main requirements: it has to be novel, not obvious and possess industrial applicability. To enrich the body of knowledge and to stimulate innovation, it is an obligation for patent owners to disclose valuable information about their inventions to the public.

=== Copyright ===
A copyright gives the creator of an original work exclusive rights to it, usually for a limited time. Copyright may apply to a wide range of creative, intellectual, or artistic forms, or "works". Copyright does not cover ideas and information themselves, only the form or manner in which they are expressed.

=== Licensing frameworks ===
Standardized copyright licensing systems are used to specify how creative works may be accessed, reused, or redistributed. Creative Commons (CC) licenses provide a set of permissions that range from highly permissive to more restrictive, outlining conditions such as attribution requirements, non-commercial use, share-alike distribution, and restrictions on derivative works. For data and database-related material, the Open Data Commons (ODC) licenses—such as the Open Database License (ODbL), the Attribution License (ODC-By), and the Public Domain Dedication and License (PDDL)—offer legal tools that govern the sharing, modification, and redistribution of databases. These licensing frameworks provide creators and institutions with flexible ways to manage copyrighted works while maintaining legal clarity in digital and collaborative environments.

=== Industrial design rights ===
An industrial design right (sometimes called "design right" or design patent) protects the visual design of objects that are not purely utilitarian. An industrial design consists of the creation of a shape, configuration or composition of pattern or color, or a combination thereof, in three-dimensional form containing aesthetic value. An industrial design can be a two- or three-dimensional pattern used to produce a product, industrial commodity or handicraft. Generally speaking, it is what makes a product look appealing, and as such, it increases the commercial value of goods.

=== Plant varieties ===
Plant breeders' rights or plant variety rights are the rights to commercially use a new variety of a plant. The variety must, amongst others, be novel and distinct and for registration the evaluation of propagating material of the variety is considered.

=== Trademarks ===
A trademark is a recognizable sign, design or expression that distinguishes a particular trader's products or services from similar products or services of other traders.

=== Trade dress ===
Trade dress is a legal term of art that generally refers to characteristics of the visual and aesthetic appearance of a product or its packaging (or even the design of a building) that signify the source of the product to consumers.

=== Trade secrets ===
A trade secret is a formula, practice, process, design, instrument, pattern, or compilation of information which is not generally known or reasonably ascertainable, by which a business can obtain an economic advantage over competitors and customers.

Trade secrets are protected by a combination of state and federal laws, which prescribe a combination of civil and criminal penalties for trade secret "misappropriation"—the improper acquisition, disclosure, or use of a trade secret.

Examples of trade secrets include Coca-Cola's formulas for its soft drinks and the WD-40 Company's formula for its lubricant WD-40.

== Motivation and justification ==
Intellectual property law is mainly intended to encourage the creation of various intellectual goods for consumers by giving people and businesses property rights to the information and intellectual goods they create, usually for a limited period of time. Because they can then profit from them, this creates economic incentives for their creation. The intangible nature of intellectual property presents difficulties when compared with traditional property like land or goods. Unlike traditional property, intellectual property is indivisible—an unlimited number of people can "consume" an intellectual good without it being depleted. Additionally, investments in intellectual goods suffer from problems of appropriation—while a landowner can surround their land with a robust fence and hire armed guards to protect it, a producer of information or an intellectual good can usually do very little to stop their first buyer from replicating it and selling it at a lower price. Balancing rights so that they are strong enough to encourage the creation of information and intellectual goods, but not so strong that they prevent their wide use, is the primary focus of modern intellectual property law.

By exchanging limited exclusive rights for disclosure of inventions and creative works, society and rightsholders mutually benefit, and an incentive is created for inventors and authors to create and disclose their works. Some commentators have noted that the objective of intellectual property legislators and supporters of intellectual property laws appears to be "objective protection". "If some intellectual property is desirable because it encourages innovation, they reason, more is better. The thinking is that creators will not have sufficient incentive to invent unless they are legally entitled to capture the full social value of their inventions". This absolute protection or full-value view treats intellectual property as another type of "real" property, typically adopting its law and rhetoric. Other recent developments in intellectual property law, such as the America Invents Act, stress international harmonization. Recently, there has also been much debate over the desirability of using intellectual property rights to protect cultural heritage, including intangible ones, as well as over risks of commodification derived from this possibility. The issue still remains open in legal scholarship.

=== Financial incentive ===
These exclusive rights allow intellectual property owners to benefit from the property they have created, providing a financial incentive for the creation of an investment in intellectual property, and, in the case of patents, pay associated research and development costs. In the United States Article I Section 8 Clause 8 of the Constitution, commonly called the Patent and Copyright Clause, reads; "The Congress shall have power 'To promote the progress of science and useful arts, by securing for limited times to authors and inventors the exclusive right to their respective writings and discoveries.'" "Some commentators, such as David Levine and Michele Boldrin, dispute this justification.

In 2013, the United States Patent and Trademark Office approximated that the worth of intellectual property to the U.S. economy is more than US$5 trillion and creates employment for an estimated 18 million American people. The value of intellectual property is considered similarly high in other developed nations, such as those in the European Union. In the UK, IP has become a recognised asset class for use in pension-led funding and other types of business finance. However, in 2013, the UK Intellectual Property Office stated: "There are millions of intangible business assets whose value is either not being leveraged at all, or only being leveraged inadvertently".

An October 2023 study released by Americans for the Arts (AFTA) found that "nonprofit arts and culture organizations and their audiences generated $151.7 billion in economic activity—$73.3 billion in spending by the organizations, which leveraged an additional $78.4 billion in event-related spending by their audiences." This spending supported 2.6 million jobs and generated $29.1 billion in local, state and federal tax revenue." 224,000 audience members and over 16,000 organizations in all 50 states and Puerto Rico were surveyed over an 18-month period to collect the data.

=== Economic growth ===
The WIPO treaty and several related international agreements underline that the protection of intellectual property rights is essential to maintaining economic growth. The WIPO Intellectual Property Handbook gives two reasons for intellectual property laws: "One is to give statutory expression to the moral and economic rights of creators in their creations and the rights of the public in access to those creations. The second is to promote, as a deliberate act of Government policy, creativity and the dissemination and application of its results and to encourage fair trading which would contribute to economic and social development."

The Anti-Counterfeiting Trade Agreement (ACTA) states that "effective enforcement of intellectual property rights is critical to sustaining economic growth across all industries and globally". Economists estimate that two-thirds of the value of large businesses in the United States can be traced to intangible assets. A joint research project of the WIPO and the United Nations University measuring the impact of IP systems on six Asian countries found "a positive correlation between the strengthening of the IP system and subsequent economic growth."

=== Morality ===
According to Article 27 of the Universal Declaration of Human Rights, "everyone has the right to the protection of the moral and material interests resulting from any scientific, literary or artistic production of which he is the author". Although the relationship between intellectual property and human rights is complex, there are moral arguments for intellectual property. The arguments that justify intellectual property fall into three major categories. Personality theorists believe intellectual property is an extension of an individual. Utilitarians believe that intellectual property stimulates social progress and pushes people to further innovation. Lockeans argue that intellectual property is justified based on deservedness and hard work. Various moral justifications for private property can be used to argue in favor of the morality of intellectual property, such as:

- The natural rights/justice argument is based on Locke's idea that a person has a natural right over the labour and products which are produced by their body. Appropriating these products is viewed as unjust. Although Locke had never explicitly stated that natural rights applied to products of the mind, it is possible to apply his argument to intellectual property rights, in which it would be unjust for people to misuse another's ideas. Locke's argument for intellectual property is based upon the idea that laborers have the right to control the material they create. They argue that, as we own our bodies which are the laborers, this right of ownership extends to what we create. Intellectual property thus ensures this right with regard to production.
- According to the utilitarian-pragmatic argument, societies that protect private property are more effective and prosperous than societies that do not. Innovation and invention in 19th-century America has been attributed to the development of the patent system. By providing innovators with "durable and tangible return on their investment of time, labor, and other resources", intellectual property rights seek to maximize social utility. The presumption is that they promote public welfare by encouraging the "creation, production, and distribution of intellectual works". Utilitarians argue that, without intellectual property, there would be a lack of incentive to produce new ideas.
- The "personality" argument is based on a quote from Hegel:
  Every man has the right to turn his will upon a thing or make the thing an object of his will, that is to say, to set aside the mere thing and recreate it as his own.
  European intellectual property law is shaped by the notion that ideas are an "extension of oneself and of one's personality". Personality theorists argue that, by being a creator of something, one is inherently at risk of (and vulnerable to) having their ideas and designs stolen and/or altered. Intellectual property protects moral claims that pertain to personality.

Lysander Spooner (1855) argues that

[A] man has a natural and absolute right—and if a natural and absolute, then necessarily a perpetual, right—of property, in the ideas, of which he is the discoverer or creator; that his right of property, in ideas, is intrinsically the same as, and stands on identically the same grounds with, his right of property in material things; that no distinction, of principle, exists between the two cases.

Writer Ayn Rand argued in her book Capitalism: The Unknown Ideal that the protection of intellectual property is essentially a moral issue. The belief is that the human mind itself is the source of wealth and survival and that all property at its base is intellectual property. Intellectual property rights violations therefore do not differ morally from violations of other property rights which compromise the very processes of survival and therefore constitute immoral acts.

== Collaboration ==
Where IPR owners collaborate, such as in the research and development field or in supply chain collaboration, IP generated through collaboration needs to be distinguished from the IP which each party brings with it to their joint work. Background, foreground, sideground and postground intellectual property types are four distinct forms of IP asset in this context. These are included in the broader and more general categories of knowledge in R&D collaborations or open innovation. While background and foreground IP and knowledge are fairly well established concepts, sideground and postground IP and knowledge have more recently been added to the conceptual vocabulary. This set of four concepts was first introduced by Prof. Ove Granstrand in a European Commission report in 2001.

The four knowledge/IP types are defined by Granstrand and Holgersson (2014) as:

- Background knowledge/IP is knowledge/IP that is relevant to a collaborative venture or open innovation project that is supplied by each of the partners at the start of the project;
- Foreground knowledge/IP is all the knowledge/IP produced within the collaborative venture or open innovation project during the term of the project;
- Sideground knowledge/IP is knowledge/IP that is relevant to a collaborative venture or open innovation project, but produced outside the project by any of the partners during the time when the project is in operation
- Postground knowledge/IP is knowledge/IP that is relevant to a collaborative venture or open innovation project that is produced by any of the partners after the project has ended.

During the time when partners are working together, each partner may be licensed to use the background IP contributed by the other partners, with the purpose and duration of such use defined in the partners' contract or project agreement. In the UK, unless partners have agreed otherwise, jointly owned IP is equally shared by all partners, regardless of, for example, their relative levels of input into the project, and rights can only be allocated to another party if all the parties agree.

== Infringement, misappropriation, and enforcement ==
Violation of intellectual property rights, called "infringement" with respect to patents, copyright, and trademarks, and "misappropriation" with respect to trade secrets, may be a breach of civil law or criminal law, depending on the type of intellectual property involved, jurisdiction, and the nature of the action. As of 2011, trade in counterfeit copyrighted and trademarked works was a $600 billion industry worldwide and accounted for 5‍–‍7% of global trade. During the Russian invasion of Ukraine, IP has been a consideration in punishment of the aggressor through trade sanctions, has been proposed as a method to prevent future wars of aggression involving nuclear weapons, and has caused concern about stifling innovation by keeping patent information secret.

=== Patent infringement ===
Patent infringement typically is caused by using or selling a patented invention without permission from the patent holder, i.e. from the patent owner. The scope of the patented invention or the extent of protection is defined in the claims of the granted patent. There is safe harbor in many jurisdictions to use a patented invention for research. This safe harbor does not exist in the US unless the research is done for purely philosophical purposes, or to gather data to prepare an application for regulatory approval of a drug. In general, patent infringement cases are handled under civil law (e.g., in the United States) but several jurisdictions incorporate infringement in criminal law also (for example, Argentina, China, France, Japan, Russia, South Korea).

=== Copyright infringement ===
Copyright infringement is reproducing, distributing, displaying or performing a work, or to make derivative works, without permission from the copyright holder, which is typically a publisher or other business representing or assigned by the work's creator. It is often called "piracy". In the United States, while copyright is created the instant a work is fixed, generally the copyright holder can only get money damages if the owner registers the copyright. Enforcement of copyright is generally the responsibility of the copyright holder. The ACTA trade agreement, signed in May 2011 by the United States, Japan, Switzerland, and the EU, and which has not entered into force, requires that its parties add criminal penalties, including incarceration and fines, for copyright and trademark infringement, and obligated the parties to actively police for infringement. There are limitations and exceptions to copyright, allowing limited use of copyrighted works, which does not constitute infringement. Examples of such doctrines are the fair use and fair dealing doctrine.

=== Trademark infringement ===
Trademark infringement occurs when one party uses a trademark that is identical or confusingly similar to a trademark owned by another party, in relation to products or services which are identical or similar to the products or services of the other party. In many countries, a trademark receives protection without registration, but registering a trademark provides legal advantages for enforcement. Infringement can be addressed by civil litigation and, in several jurisdictions, under criminal law.

=== Trade secret misappropriation ===
Trade secret misappropriation is different from violations of other intellectual property laws, since by definition trade secrets are secret, while patents and registered copyrights and trademarks are publicly available. In the United States, trade secrets are protected under state law, and states have nearly universally adopted the Uniform Trade Secrets Act. The United States also has federal law in the form of the Economic Espionage Act of 1996 (18 U.S.C. §§ 1831–1839), which makes the theft or misappropriation of a trade secret a federal crime. This law contains two provisions criminalizing two sorts of activity. The first, 18 U.S.C. § 1831(a), criminalizes the theft of trade secrets to benefit foreign powers. The second, 18 U.S.C. § 1832, criminalizes their theft for commercial or economic purposes. The statutory penalties are different for the two offenses. In Commonwealth common law jurisdictions, confidentiality and trade secrets are regarded as an equitable right rather than a property right but penalties for theft are roughly the same as in the United States.

== International governance ==
There is no overall rule-making body. The international governance of IP involves multiple overlapping institutions and forums that have developed since the late 19th century.

The Paris Convention for the Protection of Industrial Property (1883) first established the international principles for trademarks, patents, and other types of industrial property. The Berne Convention for the Protection of Literary and Artistic Works (1886) established international rules for copyright. The World Intellectual Property Organization, established by treaty in 1967 and a specialized agency of the United Nations since 1974, administers these agreements.

One of the most important aspects of global IP governance is the Agreement on Trade Related Aspects of Intellectual Property Rights (TRIPS)., which entered into force in 1995 as part of the World Trade Organization (WTO) agreements. TRIPS sets minimum standards of protection for a broad range of intellectual property rights which every member of the World Trade Organization (WTO) must comply with. A member's non-compliance with the TRIPS Agreement may be grounds for suit under the WTO's Dispute Settlement Mechanism. TRIPS also incorporates substantive provisions of the Paris and Berne Conventions. WTO members remain free to determine how these standards are implemented in their domestic legal systems and may, subject to the agreement, adopt more extensive protection. Bilateral and multi-lateral agreements often establish IP requirements above the requirements of the TRIPS Agreement.

International intellectual property governance therefore involves overlapping treaty regimes, institutions and agreements, including WIPO-administered treaties, the WTO framework, and bilateral and regional agreements.

== Criticisms ==
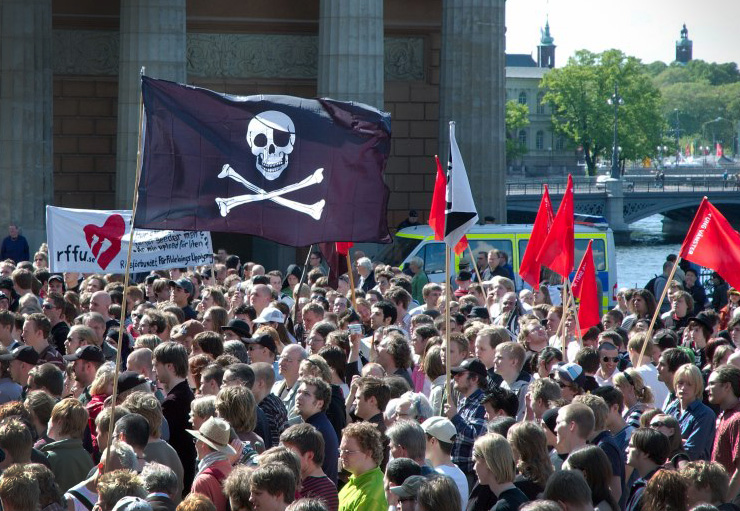
Demonstration in Sweden in support of file sharing, 2006

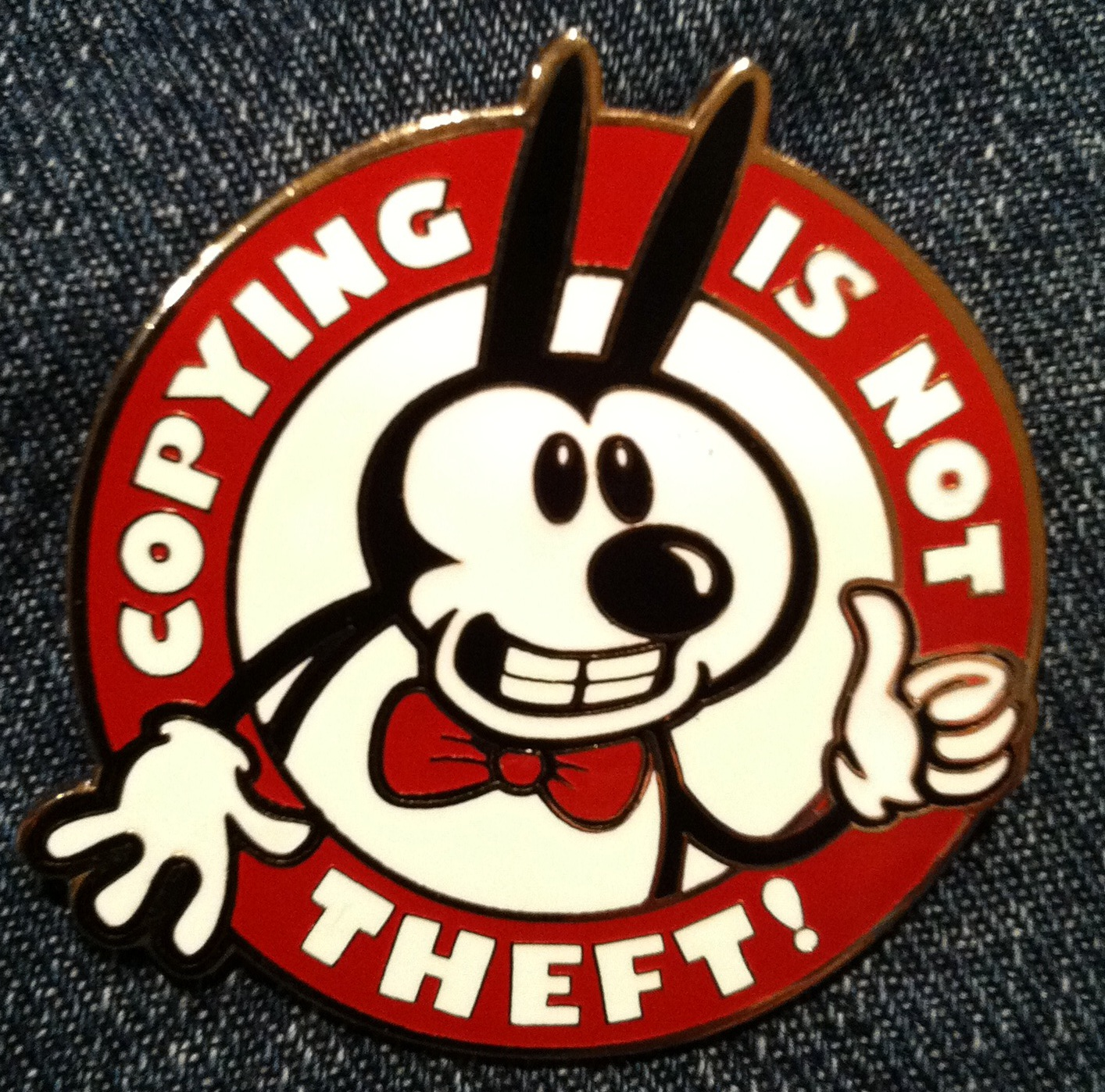
"Copying is not theft!" badge with a character resembling Mickey Mouse in reference to the "in popular culture" rationale behind the Sonny Bono Copyright Term Extension Act of 1998

=== The term "intellectual property" ===
Criticism of the term intellectual property ranges from discussing its vagueness and abstract overreach to direct contention to the semantic validity of using words like property and rights in fashions that contradict practice and law. Critics argue that this term specially serves the doctrinal agenda of parties opposing reform in the public interest or otherwise abusing related legislations, and that it disallows intelligent discussion about specific and often unrelated aspects of copyright, patents, trademarks, etc.

Free Software Foundation founder Richard Stallman argues that, although the term intellectual property is in wide use, it should be rejected altogether, because it "systematically distorts and confuses these issues, and its use was and is promoted by those who gain from this confusion". He claims that the term "operates as a catch-all to lump together disparate laws [which] originated separately, evolved differently, cover different activities, have different rules, and raise different public policy issues" and that it creates a bias by confusing these monopolies with ownership of limited physical things, likening them to property rights. Stallman advocates referring to copyrights, patents and trademarks in the singular and warns against abstracting disparate laws into a collective term. He argues that, "to avoid spreading unnecessary bias and confusion, it is best to adopt a firm policy not to speak or even think in terms of 'intellectual property'."

Similarly, economists Boldrin and Levine prefer to use the term "intellectual monopoly" as a more appropriate and clear definition of the concept, which, they argue, is very dissimilar from property rights. They further argued that "stronger patents do little or nothing to encourage innovation", mainly explained by its tendency to create market monopolies, thereby restricting further innovations and technology transfer.

On the assumption that intellectual property rights are actual rights, Stallman says that this claim does not live to the historical intentions behind these laws, which in the case of copyright served as a censorship system, and later on, a regulatory model for the printing press that may have benefited authors incidentally, but never interfered with the freedom of average readers. Still referring to copyright, he cites legal literature such as the United States Constitution and case law to demonstrate that the law is meant to be an optional and experimental bargain to temporarily trade property rights and free speech for public, not private, benefits in the form of increased artistic production and knowledge. He mentions that "if copyright were a natural right nothing could justify terminating this right after a certain period of time".

Law professor, writer and political activist Lawrence Lessig, along with many other copyleft and free software activists, has criticized the implied analogy with physical property (like land or an automobile). They argue such an analogy fails because physical property is generally rivalrous while intellectual works are non-rivalrous (that is, if one makes a copy of a work, the enjoyment of the copy does not prevent enjoyment of the original). A related argument is that unlike the situation with tangible property, there is no natural scarcity of a particular idea or information: once it exists at all, it can be re-used and duplicated indefinitely without such re-use diminishing the original. Stephan Kinsella has objected to intellectual property on the grounds that the word "property" implies scarcity, which is not applicable to ideas.

Entrepreneur and politician Rick Falkvinge and hacker Alexandre Oliva have independently compared George Orwell's fictional dialect Newspeak to the terminology used by intellectual property supporters as a linguistic weapon to shape public opinion regarding copyright debate and digital rights management (DRM).

==== Alternative terms ====
In civil law jurisdictions, intellectual property has often been referred to as intellectual rights, traditionally a somewhat broader concept that has included moral rights and other personal protections that cannot be bought or sold. Use of the term intellectual rights has declined since the early 1980s, as use of the term intellectual property has increased. Alternative terms monopolies on information and intellectual monopoly have emerged among those who argue against the property or intellect or rights assumptions, notably Richard Stallman. The backronyms intellectual protectionism and intellectual poverty, whose initials are also IP, have also found supporters, especially among those who have used the backronym digital restrictions management. The argument that an intellectual property right should (in the interests of better balancing of relevant private and public interests) be termed an intellectual monopoly privilege (IMP) has been advanced by several academics including Birgitte Andersen and Thomas Faunce.

=== Objections to overly broad intellectual property laws ===
The free-culture movement champions the production of content that bears little or no restrictions.

Some critics of intellectual property, such as those in the free-culture movement, point at intellectual monopolies as harming health (in the case of pharmaceutical patents), preventing progress, and benefiting concentrated interests to the detriment of the masses, and argue that ever-expansive monopolies in the form of copyright extensions, software patents, and business method patents harm the public interest. More recently, scientists and engineers are expressing concern that patent thickets are undermining technological development even in high-tech fields like nanotechnology. Petra Moser has asserted that historical analysis suggests that intellectual property laws may harm innovation:

Overall, the weight of the existing historical evidence suggests that patent policies, which grant strong intellectual property rights to early generations of inventors, may discourage innovation. On the contrary, policies that encourage the diffusion of ideas and modify patent laws to facilitate entry and encourage competition may be an effective mechanism to encourage innovation.

In support of that argument, Jörg Baten, Nicola Bianchi and Petra Moser find historical evidence that especially compulsory licensing—which allows governments to license patents without the consent of patent-owners—encouraged invention in Germany in the early 20th century by increasing the threat of competition in fields with low pre-existing levels of competition. Peter Drahos notes, "Property rights confer authority over resources. When authority is granted to the few over resources on which the many depend, the few gain power over the goals of the many. This has consequences for both political and economic freedom within a society."

The World Intellectual Property Organization (WIPO) recognizes that conflicts may exist between respecting and implementing current intellectual property systems and other human rights. In 2001 the UN Committee on Economic, Social and Cultural Rights issued a document called "Human rights and intellectual property" that argued that intellectual property tends to be governed by economic goals when it should be viewed primarily as a social product; in order to serve human well-being, intellectual property systems must respect and conform to human rights laws. According to the Committee, when systems fail to do so, they risk infringing upon the human right to food and health, and to cultural participation and scientific benefits. In 2004, the General Assembly of WIPO adopted The Geneva Declaration on the Future of the World Intellectual Property Organization which argues that WIPO should "focus more on the needs of developing countries, and to view IP as one of many tools for development—not as an end in itself".

Ethical problems are most pertinent when socially valuable goods like life-saving medicines are given IP protection. While the application of IP rights can allow companies to charge higher than the marginal cost of production in order to recoup the costs of research and development, the price may exclude from the market anyone who cannot afford the cost of the product, in this case a life-saving drug. "An IPR driven regime is therefore not a regime that is conductive to the investment of R&D of products that are socially valuable to predominately poor populations". Libertarians have differing views on intellectual property. Stephan Kinsella, an anarcho-capitalist on the right-wing of libertarianism, argues against intellectual property because allowing property rights in ideas and information creates artificial scarcity and infringes on the right to own tangible property. Kinsella uses the following scenario to argue this point:

[I]magine the time when men lived in caves. One bright guy—let's call him Galt-Magnon—decides to build a log cabin on an open field, near his crops. To be sure, this is a good idea, and others notice it. They naturally imitate Galt-Magnon, and they start building their own cabins. But the first man to invent a house, according to IP advocates, would have a right to prevent others from building houses on their own land, with their own logs, or to charge them a fee if they do build houses. It is plain that the innovator in these examples becomes a partial owner of the tangible property (e.g., land and logs) of others, due not to first occupation and use of that property (for it is already owned), but due to his coming up with an idea. Clearly, this rule flies in the face of the first-user homesteading rule, arbitrarily and groundlessly overriding the very homesteading rule that is at the foundation of all property rights.

Thomas Jefferson once said in a letter to Isaac McPherson on 13 August 1813:

If nature has made any one thing less susceptible than all others of exclusive property, it is the action of the thinking power called an idea, which an individual may exclusively possess as long as he keeps it to himself; but the moment it is divulged, it forces itself into the possession of every one, and the receiver cannot dispossess himself of it. Its peculiar character, too, is that no one possesses the less, because every other possesses the whole of it. He who receives an idea from me, receives instruction himself without lessening mine; as he who lights his taper at mine, receives light without darkening me.

In 2005, the Royal Society of Arts launched the Adelphi Charter, aimed at creating an international policy statement to frame how governments should make balanced intellectual property law. Another aspect of current U.S. Intellectual Property legislation is its focus on individual and joint works; thus, copyright protection can only be obtained in 'original' works of authorship. Critics like Philip Bennet argue that this does not provide adequate protection against cultural appropriation of indigenous knowledge, for which a collective IP regime is needed. Intellectual property law has been criticized as not recognizing new forms of art such as the remix culture, whose participants often commit what technically constitutes violations of such laws, creation works such as anime music videos and others, or are otherwise subject to unnecessary burdens and limitations which prevent them from fully expressing themselves.

=== Objections to the expansion in nature and scope of intellectual property laws ===
Expansion of U.S. copyright law (assuming authors create their works by age 35 and live for seventy years)

Other criticism of intellectual property law concerns the expansion of intellectual property, both in duration and in scope. As scientific knowledge has expanded and allowed new industries to arise in fields such as biotechnology and nanotechnology, originators of technology have sought IP protection for the new technologies. Patents have been granted for living organisms, and in the United States, certain living organisms have been patentable for over a century.

The increase in terms of protection is particularly seen in relation to copyright, which has recently been the subject of serial extensions in the United States and in Europe. With no need for registration or copyright notices, this is thought to have led to an increase in orphan works (copyrighted works for which the copyright owner cannot be contacted), a problem that has been noticed and addressed by governmental bodies around the world.

Also with respect to copyright, the American film industry helped to change the social construct of intellectual property via its trade organization, the Motion Picture Association (MPA). In amicus briefs in important cases, in lobbying before Congress, and in its statements to the public, the MPAA has advocated strong protection of intellectual property rights. In framing its presentations, the association has claimed that people are entitled to the property that is produced by their labor. Additionally Congress's awareness of the position of the United States as the world's largest producer of films has made it convenient to expand the conception of intellectual property. These doctrinal reforms have further strengthened the industry, lending the MPAA even more power and authority.

The growth of the Internet, and particularly distributed search engines like Kazaa and Gnutella, have represented a challenge for copyright policy. The Recording Industry Association of America, in particular, has been on the front lines of the fight against copyright infringement, which the industry calls "piracy". The industry has had victories against some services, including a highly publicized case against the file-sharing company Napster, and some people have been prosecuted for sharing files in violation of copyright. The electronic age has seen an increase in the attempt to use software-based DRM tools to restrict the copying and use of digitally based works. Laws such as the Digital Millennium Copyright Act have been enacted that use criminal law to prevent any circumvention of software used to enforce DRM systems. Equivalent provisions, to prevent circumvention of copyright protection have existed in EU for some time, and are being expanded in, for example, Article 6 and 7 the Copyright Directive. Other examples are Article 7 of the Software Directive of 1991 (91/250/EEC), and the Conditional Access Directive of 1998 (98/84/EEC). This can hinder legal uses, affecting public domain works, limitations and exceptions to copyright, or uses allowed by the copyright holder. Some copyleft licenses, like the GNU GPL 3, are designed to counter this. Laws may permit circumvention under specific conditions, such as when it is necessary to achieve interoperability with the circumventor's program, or for accessibility reasons; however, distribution of circumvention tools or instructions may be illegal.

In the context of trademarks, this expansion has been driven by international efforts to harmonise the definition of "trademark", as exemplified by the Agreement on Trade-Related Aspects of Intellectual Property Rights ratified in 1994, which formalized regulations for IP rights that had been handled by common law, or not at all, in member states. Pursuant to TRIPS, any sign which is "capable of distinguishing" the products or services of one business from the products or services of another business is capable of constituting a trademark.

=== Use in corporate tax avoidance ===
Make no mistake: the headline [tax] rate is not what triggers tax evasion and aggressive tax planning. That comes from schemes that facilitate profit shifting.

— Pierre Moscovici
European Commissioner for Tax
Financial Times, 11 March 2018

Intellectual property has become a core tool in corporate tax planning and tax avoidance. IP is a key component of the leading multinational tax avoidance base erosion and profit shifting (BEPS) tools, which the OECD estimates costs $100‍–‍240 billion in lost annual tax revenues. In 2017–2018, both the U.S. and the EU Commission simultaneously decided to depart from the OECD BEPS Project timetable, which was set up in 2013 to combat IP BEPS tax tools like the above, and launch their own anti-IP BEPS tax regimes:

- U.S. Tax Cuts and Jobs Act, which has several anti-IP BEPS abuse tax regimes, including GILTI tax and the BEAT tax regimes.
- EU Commission 2018 Digital Services Tax, which is less advanced than the U.S. TCJA, but does seek to override IP BEPS tools via a quasi-VAT.

The departure of the U.S. and EU Commission from the OECD BEPS Project process, is attributed to frustrations with the rise in IP as a key BEPS tax tool, creating intangible assets, which are then turned into royalty payment BEPS schemes (double Irish), and/or capital allowance BEPS schemes (capital allowances for intangibles). In contrast, the OECD has spent years developing and advocating intellectual property as a legal and a GAAP accounting concept.

=== Gender gap in intellectual property ===
Women have historically been underrepresented in the creation and ownership of intellectual property covered by intellectual property rights. According to the World Intellectual Property Organization, women composed only 16.5% of patent holders even as recently as 2020. This disparity is the result of several factors including systemic bias, sexism and discrimination within the intellectual property space, underrepresentation within STEM, and barriers to access of necessary finance and knowledge in order to obtain intellectual property rights, among other reasons.

=== Global IP ratchet and developing countries ===
The global increase in intellectual property protection is sometimes referred to as a global IP ratchet in which a spiral of bilateral and multilateral agreements result in growing obligations where new agreements never recede from existing standards and very often further heighten them. The global IP ratchet has limited the freedom of developing countries to set their own IP standards. Developing countries' lack of bargaining power relative to the developed countries driving the global IP ratchet means that developing countries' ability to regulate intellectual property to advance domestic interests is eroding.

== See also ==
- Copyfraud
- Defensive publication
- Freedom of information
- Information policy
- Libertarian perspectives on intellectual property
- New product development
- Soft intellectual property
- Sweat of the brow
- Intellectual property analytics
