= Eric Eldred =

American activist

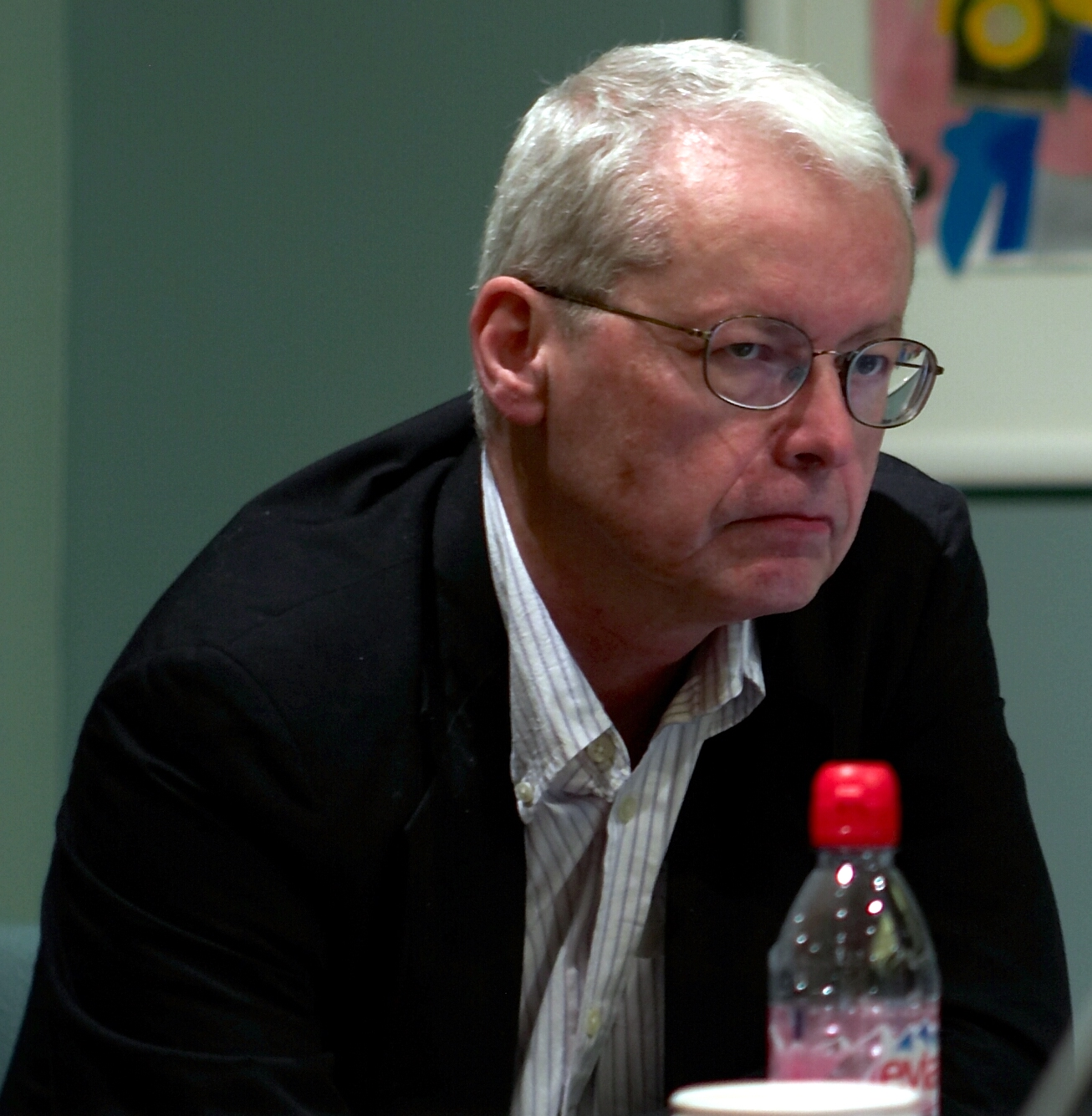
Eldred at a Creative Commons board meeting in May 2007.

Eric Eldred (born 1943) is an American literacy advocate and the proprietor of the unincorporated Eldritch Press. Eldred was lead plaintiff in Eldred v. Ashcroft, a lawsuit that challenged the constitutionality of the Sonny Bono Copyright Term Extension Act but lost in the U.S. Supreme Court in 2003 with the lawyer Lawrence Lessig. He co-founded Creative Commons and served on its board of directors.

Eric Eldred has been described as a former computer programmer and systems administrator, a Boston writer, and a New Hampshire-based technical analyst. He is an independent scholar and first published online all of Nathaniel Hawthorne's works, as well as scanning many works for Project Gutenberg and others.

== Biography ==
Eldred grew up in Florida, graduated from Harvard University in 1966 (philosophy, general studies), and then became a conscientious objector during the Vietnam War. He was ordered to work for two years as alternative service, at Massachusetts General Hospital in Boston, where he was a respiratory therapist and a chief pulmonary technologist until 1987. After he bought an Apple II computer in 1980, he was active in Apple users' groups and went to Harvard Extension School (programming and technical writing, C.A.S. 1991). Then he worked as an engineer at Apollo Computer (later Hewlett-Packard), and Cahners Publishing as a technical analyst and computer magazine journalist, then for Wang Government Services as a senior Unix systems administrator, before becoming disabled from repetitive strain injury.

During 2004–05, he lived in an Internet Bookmobile traveling the U.S. visiting schools and libraries and special events to show readers how to print their own free books.

Eldred is divorced, with three (triplet) daughters.

== Eldritch Press ==
Eldritch Press is a website which republished the works of others in the public domain (no longer subject to copyright). For some years, Eldritch Press ran on a Linux server from Eldred's home and is now hosted by Ibiblio and no longer maintained by him. Its principal feature was experimentation with HTML formats and the inclusion of graphics (while maintaining accessibility for blind readers) for online books that earlier had mostly been in ASCII format. Since the works, and Eldred's derivative works based on them, are in the public domain, anyone can make use of them, host them, and create more works of their own without payment or credit.

In 2004, Eldred was denied a permit at Walden Pond State Reservation to print and give away free copies of Walden on the 150th anniversary of its publication. In 2005, Eldred returned with a permit, secured with the help of the Berkman Center for Internet and Society at Harvard Law School, to print and give away copies of the book, and to demonstrate to readers how to self-publish and regain control of their own culture.

== Eldred v. Ashcroft ==
In 1998, the Sonny Bono Copyright Term Extension Act was passed, preventing Eldred's plans to scan and publish works first published in the US after 1922. He later became the lead plaintiff in Eldred v. Ashcroft, a lawsuit that challenged the constitutionality of this act, but lost in the US Supreme Court in 2003.
