= Olga Shirina =

Olga Shirina better known as Klimbim is a Russian artist who specializes in restoring and colorizing historic Russian and World War II photos.

In 2017, the State Duma hosted an exhibition dedicated to the birthday of Vladimir Lenin, where her works were displayed without giving her any credit.

== See also ==
- Film colorization

== Examples of her work ==
- Kazakh hunter with Golden Eagle
