= Kahle v. Gonzales =

United States Ninth Circuit Court of Appeals case

- Court: United States Court of Appeals for the Ninth Circuit
- Full case name: Brewster Kahle, et al v. Alberto R. Gonzales
- Argued: November 13, 2006
- Decided: May 14, 2007
- Citation: 487 F.3d 697

Court membership
- Judges sitting: Mary M. Schroeder, Jerome Farris, Johnnie B. Rawlinson

Case opinions
- Majority: Farris, joined by a unanimous court

Laws applied
- First Amendment; Copyright Renewal Act of 1992

Kahle v. Gonzales, 487 F.3d 697 (9th Cir. 2007) (previously named Kahle v. Ashcroft) is a First Amendment case that challenges the change in the US copyright law from an opt-in system to an opt-out system.

Four plaintiffs, the Internet Archive along with its founder, Brewster Kahle, and the Prelinger Archives and its founder Rick Prelinger, brought the suit against the government for changing the copyright regime. In the past, copyright renewal did not happen by default. Creators needed to renew copyrights after their terms expired to retain the exclusive right to reproduce their work. The Copyright Renewal Act of 1992 removed the renewal requirement, so that all copyrights would last the same term. Now, creators must explicitly remove copyright if they do not desire it.

Working from the case law of Eldred v. Ashcroft, which unsuccessfully challenged the extension of copyright, Lawrence Lessig argued that a change in copyright law as drastic as the change from opt-in to opt-out required a review in regard to freedom of speech. The plaintiffs argued that the limitations placed on speech and expression by copyright were drastically expanded and possibly too limiting.

The Ninth Circuit Court of Appeals heard the oral arguments on November 13, 2006. The Ninth Circuit rejected Kahle's arguments in an opinion issued January 22, 2007. An eight-page opinion written by Judge Jerome Farris of the Ninth Circuit stated: "They (the plaintiffs) make essentially the same argument, in different form, that the Supreme Court rejected in Eldred. It fails here as well." The Ninth Circuit rejected an appeal for en banc rehearing of the case. An amended opinion substituted the original on May 14.

The Supreme Court denied the plaintiff's petition for writ of certiorari on January 7, 2008.
