= Fairness in Music Licensing Act of 1998 =

United States federal law

Fairness in Music Licensing Act
- Long title: To amend the provisions of title 17, United States Code, with respect to the duration of copyright, and for other purposes (Title II)
- Enacted by: the 105th United States Congress
- Effective: January 25, 1999

Citations
- Public law: Pub. Law 105–298
- Statutes at Large: 112 Stat. 2827 (1998)

Codification
- Titles amended: 17 (Copyrights)
- U.S.C. sections created: 17 U.S.C. § 512
- U.S.C. sections amended: 17 U.S.C. §§ 101, 110, 504

Legislative history
- Introduced in the United States House of Representatives

The Fairness in Music Licensing Act increased the number of bars and restaurants that were exempted from needing a public performance license to play music or television during business hours. The bill was companion legislation passed along with the Copyright Term Extension Act in 1998.

== Background and passage ==
United States copyright law gives copyright owners the exclusive right to publicly perform their works. Performance rights organizations (PROs), such as ASCAP, BMI, SESAC and Acemla, administer public performance rights for songwriters and composers, providing blanket licenses to venues allowing them to play music for their customers.

Section 110(5) of the Copyright Act of 1976 exempted the need for a public performance license for music played on "a single receiving apparatus of a kind commonly used in private homes" and without a "direct charge" made to listen to the performance. In the years following, courts have interpreted the provision in widely divergent ways, leading to uncertainty for bar and restaurant owners who played music on their premises. Many restaurant and bar owners also complained about "disruptive" and "coercive" tactics employed by field agents of the PROs investigating unlicensed establishments.

As a result, the National Restaurant Association, the National Licensed Beverage Association, and similar interest groups began lobbying for a more favorable exemption in the early 1990s. Their legislative attempts were strongly opposed by the PROs, who argued that music played in bars and restaurants draws customers in and songwriters deserve to be compensated for the use of their works in this manner.

Despite the opposition, the bill was ultimately successful, after having been attached as an amendment to the Copyright Term Extension Act, and was signed into law on October 27, 1998. The new provision kept the 'homestyle' exemption of the original provision but added specific exemptions based on the type of establishment, size of establishment, and type of equipment used to play music. Several studies have concluded that the Act exempts around 70% of eating and drinking establishments.

== WTO Dispute ==
Shortly after the bill went into effect, the European Communities began dispute proceedings against the United States in front of the World Trade Organization, claiming the new exemption violated the Berne Convention's protection of an author's exclusive public performance right. On July 27, 2000, the WTO's Dispute Settlement Body sided with the EC and held that the exemption violated Articles 11bis(1)(iii) and 11(1)(ii) of the Berne Convention (1971) as incorporated into the TRIPS Agreement by Article 9.1. The US and EC announced a temporary settlement arrangement on June 23, 2003, though the Fairness in Music Licensing Act remains in effect. Under the Temporary Settlement, effective June 23, 2003 through December 20, 2004, the US paid $3.3 million to a fund established in the EU for the benefit of rights-holders. As of May 7, 2010, the US continues to file required status reports with the WTO stating that "The US Administration is working closely with the US Congress and will continue to confer with the European Communities in order to reach a mutually satisfactory resolution of this matter."
