= Wilson Markle =

Canadian engineer (born 1938)

- Born: September 2, 1938; Vancouver, British Columbia, Canada
- Died: July 25, 2020 (aged 81); King, Ontario, Canada
- Engineering career
- Institutions: Colorization Inc.
- Significant advance: Film colorization

Wilson Markle (September 2, 1938 – July 25, 2020) was a Canadian engineer who invented the film colorization process in 1970. His first company, Image Transform, colored pictures from the Apollo space program to make a full-color television presentation for NASA.

His method used computers to assign predetermined colors to shades of gray in each scene.

In 1983, he founded Colorization Inc., which was co-owned by Hal Roach Studios and International HRS Industries. The word "colorization" later became a generic name.

== Patents ==
An application for the first patent on the process was made by Colorization Inc. on 11 July 1983, listing Wilson Markle and Christopher Mitchell as inventors. It was issued on 1 December 1987 (US Patent 4710805).
