= National Film Preservation Foundation =

Nonprofit organization created by US Congress

- Type: Incentive
- Industry: Nonprofit organization
- Genre: Independent film
- Founded: 1996; United States
- Headquarters: 145 Ninth Street, Suite 260, San Francisco, United States
- Website: www.filmpreservation.org

The National Film Preservation Foundation (NFPF) is an independent, nonprofit organization created by the U.S. Congress to help save America's film heritage. Growing from a national planning effort led by the Library of Congress, the NFPF began operations in 1997. It supports activities nationwide that preserve American films and improve film access for study, education, and exhibition. The NFPF's top priority is saving orphan films, so called because they are not protected by commercial interests and are unlikely to survive without public support. Through its grant programs, the NFPF has helped archives, historical societies, libraries, museums, and universities from all 50 states preserve American films and make them available to the public.

== Background ==
The National Film Preservation Foundation was created by the U.S. Congress in 1996, at the recommendation of the Library of Congress, following four years of hearings and research conducted by the Library's National Film Preservation Board. The National Film Preservation Act of 1996 (Public Law 104-285, Title II), signed into law on October 11, 1996, charged the NFPF to "encourage, accept, and administer private gifts to promote and ensure the preservation and public accessibility of the nation's film heritage" and authorized federal funds to advance this work. The NFPF started operations a year later in 1997 as an independent federally chartered grant-giving public charity and the nonprofit charitable affiliate of the Library of Congress's National Film Preservation Board. Since 1996 Congress has increased the NFPF's authorization twice, in 2005 via the Family Entertainment and Copyright Act of 2005 (Public Law 109-9) and in 2008 via the Library of Congress Sound Recording and Film Preservation Programs Reauthorization Act of 2008 (Public Law 110-336). Funding received through the NFPF's authorization is secured through the Library of Congress and goes directly to the field for film preservation projects.

== Grant program ==
Federal funding received by the NFPF is made available through competitive grants. The program is open to American nonprofit and public institutions of all sizes and experience levels. Awards are made by expert panels, which are recruited from the preservation and scholarly communities and serve on behalf of the NFPF Board. To receive an award, institutions must pledge to provide public access to their films and to store them under cool-and-dry conditions that will extend their useful life. Films preserved through the NFPF are made available for education and shared with the public via screenings, exhibits, DVDs, broadcasts, and the Internet. Since starting its grant program in 1998, the NFPF has assisted 239 institutions across all 50 states, the District of Columbia, and Puerto Rico and has helped save more than 1,870 films. Films preserved through NFPF grants range from silent-era films to industrials, documentaries, newsreels, culturally significant home movies, avant-garde works, and independent productions.

== Cooperative projects ==
The NFPF also organizes, secures funding for, and manages cooperative projects that enable film organizations—large and small—to join forces on national and international projects. Some of its previous and current projects include:

- Treasure of American Film Archives (1999–2000). Funded by the National Endowment for the Arts and The Pew Charitable Trusts, this project involved 18 archives and resulted in new preservation work for more than 100 films and footage collections, ranging from home movies of Duke Ellington's band on tour to the first feature film shot entirely in Alaska. The collaboration culminated in the Treasures from American Film Archives: 50 Preserved Films (2000), the first volume of the NFPF's award-winning Treasures DVD series.
- Saving the Silents (2001–2002). Funded by the Department of Interior's Save America's Treasures fund and administered by the National Endowment for the Arts, this project produced new 35mm preservation masters and prints of 94 films endangered silent-era shorts, serials, and features from the collections of George Eastman House, the Museum of Modern Art, and UCLA Film & Television Archive. Also supported was a massive updating of the International Federation of Film Archives' authoritative database of surviving silent-era film titles.
- The Film Connection (2008-2010). Through this project, eight short American silent films held by the National Film and Sound Archive of Australia—that no longer survived in the United States—were preserved and deposited at the Academy of Motion Picture Arts and Sciences, George Eastman House, the Library of Congress, the Museum of Modern Art, and UCLA Film & Television Archive. Six of the films can be viewed free or charged on the NFPF Web site.
- The New Zealand Project (2010–2014). With funding from The Andrew W. Mellon Foundation and a Save America's Treasures grant administered by the National Park Service and the National Endowment for the Arts, this project will result in the preservation and repatriation of more than 130 American silent films held by the New Zealand Film Archive. Among the films are many once thought lost, such as Upstream (1927) by John Ford and The White Shadow (1924) by Graham Cutts and Alfred Hitchcock.

== Publications ==
The NFPF publishes DVD sets and books that promote the preservation of American film. For more than a decade, the NFPF's Treasures from American Film Archives DVD series has made available preservation work from the archival community. Created in collaboration with archives, scholars, and musicians, the sets present long unseen American films with new musical accompaniment, onscreen program notes, and a printed catalog. Besides the Treasures DVDs, the NFPF has also published two reference books, The Field Guide to Sponsored Films (2006) and The Film Preservation Guide: The Basics for Archives, Libraries, and Museums (2004).

== Bibliography ==
- Boliek, B (March 23, 2000). "Preservation Foundation Adds Fed Funds into the Mix," The Hollywood Reporter.
- Desowitz, R (August 30, 1998). "Orphans on the Doorstep of Preservation," The Los Angeles Times.
- Film Preservation 1993: A Study of the Current State of American Film Preservation (Washington, D.C.: Library of Congress, 1993).
- "Film Preservation: A Critical Symposium." Cineaste 36, no. 4 (2011): 40-50.
- Horak, J. "The Film Preservation Guide." Film Quarterly 58, no. 3 (2005).
- Redefining Film Preservation: A National Plan (Washington, D.C.: Library of Congress, 1994).
