= Libertarian perspectives on intellectual property =

Libertarians have differing opinions on the validity of intellectual property. Most left-libertarians oppose it whereas among propertarians/right-libertarians and libertarian parties there is more nuance, ranging from strong opposition to neutrality and support (particularly from those who are influenced by Ayn Rand's views).

== Left-libertarianism ==
Most left-libertarians, dating back to Pierre-Joseph Proudhon (a libertarian socialist who is considered "the father of anarchism"), oppose intellectual property as part of their broad criticism of capitalism and anti-capitalism. Benjamin Tucker, a 19th-century American individualist anarchist opposing intellectual property, argued that "the patent monopoly consists in protecting inventors against competition for a period long enough to extort from the people a reward enormously in excess of the labor measure of their services, – in other words, in giving certain people a right of property for a term of years in laws and facts of Nature, and the power to exact tribute from others for the use of this natural wealth, which should be open to all." Lysander Spooner, another 19th-century American individualist anarchist or left-libertarian who also influenced propertarians/right-libertarians, argued strongly for patents, while Henry George distinguished between patents and copyrights.

Into the 21st century, Roderick T. Long argues that the concept of intellectual property is not libertarian. He holds that prohibiting people from using, reproducing, and trading copyrighted material is an infringement of freedom of speech and freedom of the press, and that since information exists in people's minds and other people's property, one cannot own information without owning other people. Arguing that authors and publishers would continue to produce absent copyright protection, he cites the fact that hundreds of thousands of articles are uploaded onto the Internet by their authors every day, available to anyone in the world for free and that nearly all works written before the 20th century are in the public domain, yet pre-1900 works are still published and sold.

== Propertarianism/Right-libertarianism ==
Anarcho-capitalists oppose the existence of even a minimal state. This ideological framework requires that any functions served by intellectual property law promulgation and enforcement be provided through private sector institutions. Murray Rothbard argued for allowing contractually arising infinite copyright terms and against the need for any government role in protecting intellectual property. Rothbard states that government's involvement in defining arbitrary limits on the duration and scope of intellectual property in order to "promote the Progress of Science and useful Arts" is inherently problematic, saying: "By what standard do you judge that research expenditures are 'too much,' 'too little,' or just about enough?" Thus, he argued that intellectual property laws can actually hinder innovation since competitors can be indefinitely discouraged from further research expenditures in the general area covered by the patent because the courts may hold their improvements as infringements on the previous patent and the patent holder is discouraged from engaging in further research in this field because the privilege discourages improvement of their invention for the entire period of the patent, with the assurance that no competitor can trespass on their domain.

Morris and Linda Tannehill proposed that ideas in the form of inventions could be registered in a privately owned "data bank". The inventor could then buy insurance against the theft and unauthorized commercial use of the invention and the insurance company would guarantee to not only compensate the inventor for any losses suffered due to such infringement but to stop such unauthorized use. Opponents to intellectual property rights include Wendy McElroy, Tom G. Palmer, Henri Lepage, Boudewijn Bouckaert, Jeffrey Tucker, and Stephan Kinsella. Kinsella observes in Against Intellectual Property that patents may be inefficient since they divert resources from research and development to patent filing and lawsuits. He writes that theoretical research can not be patented as easily as practical research and thus theoretical research is relatively underfunded. Moreover, he argues that property rights can only apply to resources that are scarce, which intellectual property is not. Kinsella also states that the only way that intellectual property rights can be implemented is by limiting others' physical property rights. David D. Friedman takes a neutral stance on intellectual property, arguing that "there are good arguments on both sides of that question". J. Neil Schulman instead argued in favor of intellectual property.

== Ayn Rand ==
Ayn Rand, the founder of Objectivism who herself was not a libertarian but who had a significant influence on Rothbard (prior to his department from her philosophical studies circle) and other right-libertarians, supported copyrights and patents. In Capitalism: The Unknown Ideal, she wrote:

Patents and copyrights are the legal implementation of the base of all property rights: a man's right to the product of his mind. Every type of productive work involves a combination of mental and of physical effort: of thought and of physical action to translate that thought into a material form. The proportion of these two elements varies in different types of work. At the lowest end of the scale, the mental effort required to perform unskilled manual labor is minimal. At the other end, what the patent and copyright laws acknowledge is the paramount role of mental effort in the production of material values; these laws protect the mind's contribution in its purest form the origination of an idea. The subject of patents and copyrights is intellectual property. ... Thus the law establishes the property right of a mind to that which it has brought in existence.

Rand held that patent should be granted for limited terms only. She wrote:

If it were held in perpetuity, it would lead to the opposite of the very principle on which it is based: it would lead, not to the earned reward of achievement, but to the unearned support of parasitism. It would become a cumulative lien on the production of unborn generations, which would ultimately paralyze them. Consider what would happen if, in producing an automobile, we had to pay royalties to the descendants of all the inventors involved, starting with the inventor of the wheel and on up. Apart from the impossibility of keeping such records, consider the accidental status of such descendants and the unreality of their unearned claims.

== Libertarian political parties ==
The Libertarian Party of Canada takes "a moderate approach to patents and copyrights", calling for "a careful review of existing and proposed legislation". The Libertarian Party of Russia writes in its platform that "intellectual property" is a privilege granted by the state. Accordingly, "intellectual property rights" are enforced by the state through violence. On this basis, it writes in its program that it intends to repeal the section of the Civil Code of Russia, as well as the articles of the Code of the Russian Federation on Administrative Offenses and Criminal Code of Russia that provide for sanctions for infringement of "intellectual property rights".

== See also ==
- Copyleft
- Copyright Term Extension Act (CTEA)
