= Soft intellectual property =

Soft intellectual property (soft IP) is sometimes used to refer to trademarks, copyright, design rights and passing off, in contrast to "hard intellectual property", which is sometimes used to refer to patents. Use of this phrase is controversial among IP practitioners.

In the semiconductor industry the term has a different meaning described at Types of IP cores.
