= Film colorization =

Practice of adding color to monochrome motion pictures

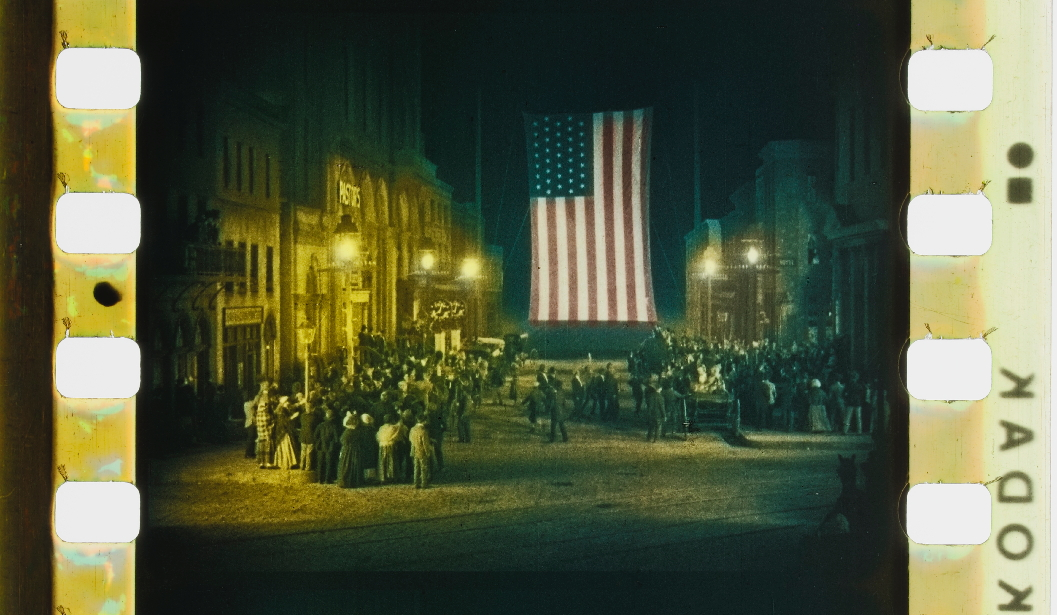
Color applied to the 1925 film Lights of Old Broadway through the Handschiegl process

Film colorization (American English; or colourisation/colorisation [both British English], or colourization [Canadian English and Oxford English]) is any process that adds color to black-and-white, sepia, or other monochrome moving-picture images. It may be done as a special effect, to "modernize" black-and-white films, or to restore color segregation. The first examples date from the early 20th century, but colorization has become common with the advent of digital image processing.

== Early techniques ==
=== Hand colorization ===
A hand-colored print of Georges Méliès' The Impossible Voyage (1904)

The first film colorization methods were hand-done by individuals. For example, at least 4% of Georges Méliès' output, including some prints of A Trip to the Moon from 1902 and other major films such as The Kingdom of the Fairies, The Impossible Voyage, and The Barber of Seville were individually hand-colored by Berthe and Elisabeth Thuillier's coloring lab in Paris. Elisabeth Thuillier, a former colorist of glass and celluloid products, directed a studio of 220 women painting directly on film stock with brushes, in the colors she chose and specified; each worker was assigned a different color in assembly line style, with more than 20 separate colors often used for a single film. Thuillier's lab produced about 60 hand-colored copies of A Trip to the Moon, but only one copy is known to still exist today. The first full-length feature film made by a hand-colored process was The Miracle, in 1912.

The process was always done by hand, sometimes using a stencil cut from a second print of the film, such as the Pathécolor process. As late as the 1920s, hand-coloring processes were used for individual shots in Greed (1924) and The Phantom of the Opera (1925) (both utilizing the Handschiegl color process); and rarely, an entire feature-length movie such as Cyrano de Bergerac (1925) and The Last Days of Pompeii (1926).

These colorization methods were employed until effective color film processes were developed. Around 1968-1972, black-and-white Betty Boop, Krazy Kat and Looney Tunes cartoons among others were redistributed in color. Supervised by Fred Ladd, color was added by tracing the original black-and-white frames onto new animation cels, and then adding color to the new cels in South Korea. To cut time and expense, Ladd's process skipped every other frame, cutting the frame rate in half; this technique considerably degraded the quality and timing of the original animation, to the extent that some animation was not carried over or mistakenly altered. The most recent redrawn colorized black-and-white cartoons are the Fleischer Studios/Famous Studios' Popeye cartoons, the Harman-Ising Merrie Melodies, and MGM's The Captain and the Kids cartoons, which were colorized in 1987 for airing on the Turner networks. With computer technology, studios were able to add color to black-and-white films by digitally tinting single objects in each frame of the film until it was fully colorized (the first authorized computer-colorizations of B&W cartoons were commissioned by Warner Bros. in 1990). The initial process was invented by Canadian Wilson Markle and was first used in 1970 to add color to monochrome footage of the moon from the Apollo program missions.

=== Digital colorization ===
Computerized colorization began in the 1970s using the technique invented by Wilson Markle. These early attempts at colorization have soft contrast and fairly pale, flat, washed-out color; however, the technology has improved steadily since the 1980s.

To perform digital colorization, a digitized copy of the best black and white film print available is used. With the aid of computer software, technicians associate a range of gray levels to each object and indicate to the computer any movement of the objects within a shot. The software is also capable of sensing variations in the light level from frame-to-frame and correcting it if necessary. The technician selects a color for each object based on common "memory" colors—such as blue sky, white clouds, flesh tones, and green grass—and on any information about colors used in the movie. If color publicity stills or props are available to examine, authentic colors may be applied. In the absence of any better information, technicians may choose colors that fit the gray level and are consistent with what a director might have wanted for the scene. The software associates a variation of the basic color with each gray level in the object, while keeping intensity levels the same as in the monochrome original. The software then follows each object from frame to frame, applying the same color until the object leaves the frame. As new objects come into the frame, the technician must associate colors to each new object in the same way as described above. This technique was patented in 1991.

In order to colorize a still image, an artist typically begins by dividing the image into regions, and then assigning a color to each region. This approach, also known as the segmentation method, is laborious and time-consuming, especially in the absence of fully automatic algorithms to identify fuzzy or complex region boundaries, such as those between a subject's hair and face. Colorization of moving images also requires motion compensation, tracking regions as movement occurs from one frame to the next.

Several companies claim to have produced automatic region-tracking algorithms:

- Legend Films describes their core technology as pattern recognition and background compositing that moves and morphs foreground and background masks from frame to frame. In the process, backgrounds are colorized separately in a single composite frame which functions as a visual database of a cut, and includes all offset data on each camera movement. Once the foreground areas are colorized, background masks are applied frame-to-frame.
- Timebrush describes a process based on neural net technology that produces saturated and crisp colors with clear lines and no apparent spill-over. The process is cost effective because it relies on computers rather than human effort, and is equally suitable for low-budget colorization and broadcast-quality or theatrical projection.
- A team at the Hebrew University of Jerusalem's Benin School of Computer Science and Engineering describe their method as an interactive process that does not require precise manual region detection, nor accurate tracking; it is based on the premise that adjacent pixels in space and time that have similar gray levels should also have similar colors.
- At the University of Minnesota, a color propagation method was developed that uses geodesic distance.
- A highly labor-intensive process employed by the UK-based film and video colorization artist Stuart Humphryes, in conjunction with video restoration company SVS Resources, was employed by the BBC in 2013 for the commercial release of two Doctor Who serials: the first episode of The Mind of Evil and newly discovered black and white footage in the director's cut of Terror of the Zygons. For these projects, approximately 7,000 key-frames (approximately every 5th PAL video frame) were fully colorized by hand, without the use of masks, layers, or the segmentation method. These were then utilized by SVS Resources to interpolate the color across the intervening surrounding frames using a part computerized/part manual process.

== Uses of colorization ==
=== Partial colorization ===
The earliest form of colorization introduced limited color into a black-and-white film using dyes, as a visual effect. The earliest Edison films, most notably the Annabelle Serpentine Dance series, were also the earliest examples of colorization, done by painting aniline dyes onto the emulsion.

Around 1905, Pathé introduced Pathéchrome, a stencil process that required cutting one or more stencils for each film frame with the aid of a reducing pantograph.

In 1916, the Handschiegl Color Process was invented for Cecil B. DeMille's film Joan the Woman (1917). Another early example of the Handschiegl process can be found in Phantom of the Opera (1925), in which Lon Chaney's character can be seen wearing a bright-red cape while the rest of the scene remained monochrome. The scene was toned sepia, and then the cape was painted red, either by stencil or by matrix. Then, a sulfur solution was applied to everything but the dyed parts, turning the sepia into blue tone. The process was named after its inventor, Max Handschiegl. This effect, as well as a missing color sequence, were recreated in 1996 for a Photoplay Productions restoration by computer colorization (see below).

Partial colorization has also been utilized on footage shot in color to enhance commercials and broadcast television to further facilitate the director's artistic vision. As an example, Cerulean Fx provided partial colorization for Dave Matthews Band's music video The Space Between as well as Outkast's music videos Bombs Over Baghdad and Roses.

=== Restoration ===
A number of British television shows which were made in color in the early 1970s were wiped for economic reasons, but in some cases black-and-white telerecordings were made for export to countries that did not yet have color television. An example is the BBC's five-part Doctor Who story The Dæmons. Only one episode survived in color; the rest existed only as black-and-white film recordings. The only known color recording was a poor-quality over-the-air recording of an abridged broadcast in the United States. In the 1990s, the BBC colorized the black-and-white copies by adding the color signal from the over-the-air recordings. The result was judged a success by both technicians and fans. In March 2008, it was announced that new technology, which involves detecting color artifacts ("dot crawl") in high-resolution scans of black-and-white films, will be used to restore other Doctor Who episodes as well as shows like Steptoe and Son where some episodes originally produced in color only exist in black-and-white. However, there are no plans to use colorization on BBC programs originally produced in black-and-white, such as the 1960s Doctor Who episodes, since they have no color information available and so cannot be recovered using these methods.

=== Integration ===
Colorization is also sometimes used on historical stock footage in color movies. For instance, the film Thirteen Days (2000) uses colorized news footage from the time of the Cuban Missile Crisis of 1962.

The full-color feature film Sky Captain and the World of Tomorrow (2004), which already made heavy use of digitally generated sets and objects, integrated black-and-white 1940s footage of Sir Laurence Olivier into scenes by colorizing him.

In his feature film The Aviator (2005), Martin Scorsese seamlessly blended colorized stock footage of the Hell's Angels movie premiere with footage of the premiere's reenactment. The colorization by Legend Films was designed to look like normal three-strip film but was then color corrected to match the two-strip look of the premiere's reenactment. Also in The Aviator, Scorsese used colorized footage of Jane Russell from the original black-and-white film, The Outlaw and dog fight scenes from Hell's Angels.

== Colorization examples, criticism, and controversies ==
=== Entertainment make-overs ===
In 1977, Italian director Luigi Cozzi released a colorized version of the 1956 Kaiju film Godzilla, King of the Monsters!, which he nicknamed "Cozzilla", an American edit of the Japanese movie simply titled Godzilla. The colorization was the result of Italian cinemas at the time refusing to release a film in black and white, forcing Cozzi to colorize it in order to ensure its release. The colorization was done by Alberto Moro, who placed gel over the black and white footage to achieve the appearance of a film in color, giving it a look that has been described by critics as "psychedelic". This version of the film was never rereleased officially, though a scan of the film's print eventually resurfaced online.

In 1983, Hal Roach Studios became one of the first studios to venture into the business of computerized film colorization. Buying a 50 percent interest in Wilson Markle's Colorization, Inc., it began creating digitally colored versions of some of its films. Roach's Topper (1937), followed by Way Out West (1937), became the first black-and-white films to be redistributed in color using the digital colorization process, leading to controversy. Defenders of the process noted that it would allow black-and-white films to have new audiences of people who were not used to the format. Detractors complained (among other reasons) that the process was crude and claimed that, even if it were refined, it would not take into account lighting compositions chosen for black-and-white photography which would not necessarily be as effective in color. Figures opposed to the process included Roger Ebert, James Stewart, John Huston, George Lucas, and Woody Allen.

Cary Grant was reportedly "very gung-ho with the outcome" of the colorization of Topper. Director Frank Capra met with Wilson Markle about colorizing the perennial Christmas classic It's a Wonderful Life, Meet John Doe, and Lady for a Day based on Grant's enthusiasm. Colorization, Inc.'s art director Brian Holmes screened ten minutes of colorized footage from It's a Wonderful Life to Capra, which led Capra to sign a contract with Colorization, Inc. However, the film was believed to be in the public domain at the time, and, as a result, Markle and Holmes responded by returning Capra's initial investment, eliminating his financial participation, and refusing outright to allow the director to exercise artistic control over the colorization of his films, leading Capra to join in the campaign against the process.

On a December 27, 1989 episode of The Tonight Show Starring Johnny Carson actor Jimmy Stewart criticized efforts to colorize old black-and-white films, including It's a Wonderful Life.

Night of the Living Dead, colorized in 1986...

...and 2004.

In 1986, film critics Gene Siskel and Roger Ebert did a special episode of Siskel & Ebert addressing colorization as "Hollywood's New Vandalism". Siskel explained how networks were unable to show classic black-and-white films in prime-time unless they offer it in color. "They arrest people who spray subway cars, they lock up people who attack paintings and sculptures in museums, and adding color to black and white films, even if it's only to the tape shown on TV or sold in stores, is vandalism nonetheless." Roger Ebert added, "What was so wrong about black and white movies in the first place? By filming in black and white, movies can sometimes be more dreamlike and elegant and stylized and mysterious. They can add a whole additional dimension to reality, while color sometimes just supplies additional unnecessary information." Media mogul Ted Turner was once an aggressive proponent of this process, by employing the San Diego firm American Film Technologies. When he told members of the press in July 1988 that he was considering colorizing Citizen Kane, Turner's comments led to an immediate public outcry. In January 1989 the Associated Press reported that two companies were producing color tests of Citizen Kane for Turner Entertainment Co. Criticism increased with the AP's report that filmmaker Henry Jaglom remembered that, shortly before his death, Orson Welles had implored him to protect Kane from being colorized.

On February 14, 1989, Turner Entertainment president Roger Mayer announced that work to colorize Citizen Kane had been stopped:

Our attorneys looked at the contract between RKO Pictures Inc. and Orson Welles and his production company, Mercury Productions Inc., and, on the basis of their review, we have decided not to proceed with colorization of the movie. ... While a court test might uphold our legal right to colorize the film, provisions of the contract could be read to prohibit colorization without permission of the Welles estate.

One minute of the colorized test footage of Citizen Kane was included in a special Arena documentary, The Complete Citizen Kane, produced by the BBC in 1991.

John Huston's opposition to the colorization of his work led to a landmark three-year French legal case after his death, sparked by a colorized version of The Asphalt Jungle. His daughter Anjelica Huston successfully used French copyright law to set a binding precedent in 1991 that prevents the distribution or broadcasting in France of any colorized version of a film against the wishes of the original creator or their heirs. Major legislative reaction in the United States was the National Film Preservation Act of 1988 (Public Law 100-446), which prohibits any person from knowingly distributing or exhibiting to the public a film that has been materially altered, or a black and white film that has been colorized and is included in the Registry, unless such films are labeled disclosing specified information. This law also created the National Film Registry.

Because of the high cost of the process, Turner Entertainment stopped colorizing titles. With the coming of DVD technology, the notion of colorization was once again gaining press. Because the DVD format was more versatile, studios could offer viewers the option to choose between both versions without switching discs, and thus, the release of colorized titles once again seemed profitable. Some companies rereleased the older colorized versions from the 1980s—an example of this is the Laurel and Hardy box set being released in the UK.

Other studios, such as Sony Pictures, commissioned West Wing Studios to colorize several Three Stooges films for DVD release. The studio was given access to the original Columbia Studios props and sets to lend authenticity to the colorized versions.

Both film and television restoration and colorization is produced by the company Legend Films. Their patented automated process was used to colorize around 100 films between 2003 and 2009. Shirley Temple, Jane Russell, Terry Moore, and Ray Harryhausen have worked with the company to colorize either their own films or their personal favorites. Two movies that Legend Films are noted for is the colorization of the exploitation film Reefer Madness, for which certain color schemes were used to create a psychedelic effect in its viewers, and Plan 9 from Outer Space. Recently (2007), Legend Films colorized It's a Wonderful Life for Paramount Pictures (whose subsidiary, Republic Pictures, had regained control of the copyright in the 1990s) and Holiday Inn in 2008 for rights holder Universal Pictures.

In 2004, a classic Indian film, Mughal-e-Azam, was colored for theatrical release all over the world by the Indian Academy of Arts and Animation (IAAA) in association with Sankranti Creations. Since 2013, Livepixel Technologies, founded by Rajeev Dwivedi has been the sole player in film colorization business and almost completed more than 100 titles related with World War.

In 2005, Sony Pictures Home Entertainment released the first season of Bewitched on DVD. Because the first season was produced in black-and-white, Sony released two versions of the set: one with the episodes as originally broadcast and a second with the episodes colorized. A year later, the second season of Bewitched and the first season of I Dream of Jeannie, another show owned by Sony, were released the same way. These releases were colorized by Dynacs Digital Studios, a Florida-based company with film colorization and animation studios in Patna, India.

CBS has colorized a number of episodes of I Love Lucy, The Andy Griffith Show and The Dick Van Dyke Show in the 2010s, which are timed to air on Friday nights in holiday periods.

Colorization has also been used to restore scenes from color films that were cut from the finished product but were preserved in black-and-white. In 2018, the originally intended closing scene to the 1978 film Grease (in which the lead characters kiss) was added to the film's 40th anniversary release. A challenge that still plagues colorization efforts is the fact that the colorized black-and-white film may not match film shot originally in color; Randal Kleiser, the director of Grease, wanted to edit the scene back into the film but found the colors between the scenes did not match well enough to do so. Kleiser is optimistic that colorization technology will be advanced enough to match true color by 2028, when Grease reaches its 50th anniversary.

=== Documentary make-overs ===
Colorization is sometimes used on documentary programs. The Beatles Anthology TV show colorizes some footage of the band, such as the performance of "All You Need Is Love" from the TV special Our World (1967). In the documentary, this scene begins in its original black-and-white before dissolving into seemingly realistic, psychedelic color. The color design was based on color photographs taken at the same time as the special was shot. More Beatle footage was colorized for the 2016 documentary The Beatles: Eight Days a Week, such as a performance of "Help!"

The documentary series World War 1 in Colour (2003) was broadcast on television and released on DVD in 2005. There had previously been full-color documentaries about World War II using genuine color footage, but since true color film was not practical for moving pictures at the time of World War I, the series consists of colorized contemporary footage (and photographs). Several documentaries on the Military Channel feature colorized war footage from the Second World War and the Korean War.

The 1960 Masters Tournament, originally broadcast in black-and-white and recorded on kinescope, was colorized by Legend Films for the documentary Jim Nantz Remembers. This was the first time a major sports event had been rebroadcast using colorization.

In Peter Jackson's well-received 2018 documentary, They Shall Not Grow Old, black and white footage from First World War trenches was colorized.

The Greatest Game Ever Played, the 1958 NFL Championship between the Baltimore Colts and the New York Giants, was colorized by Legend Films for ESPN for a sports broadcast special in December 2008.

== See also ==
- National Film Preservation Act
- TNT (TV channel)
- Turner Classic Movies / History
- 2D to 3D conversion—many of the issues involved in colorization, such as object edge identification/recognition, are also encountered in 3-D conversion
- Color recovery of black and white copies that still have color information in them from color recordings
