= National Film Preservation Board =

American government board

- Logo
- Founded: 1988
- Type: Film preservation
- Location: United States

The United States National Film Preservation Board (NFPB) is the board selecting films for preservation in the Library of Congress' National Film Registry. It was established by the National Film Preservation Act of 1988. The National Film Registry is meant to preserve up to 25 "culturally, historically or aesthetically significant films" each year; to be eligible, films must be at least 10 years old. Originally the board was made up of 13 members and had to meet within 90 days of the bill passing in September 1988 to select 25 films. Members of the Board also advise the Librarian of Congress on ongoing development and implementation of the national film preservation plan.

The NFPB is a federal agency located within the Library of Congress. The NFPB was established by the National Film Preservation Act of 1988, and reauthorized in 1992, 1996 and 2005. The 1996 reauthorization also created the non-profit National Film Preservation Foundation, which is loosely affiliated with the National Film Preservation Board, but the private-sector Foundation (NFPF) and federal Board (NFPB) are separate, legally distinct entities.

== Organization ==
The board is appointed by the Librarian of Congress and is composed of representatives from professional organizations representing the film industry, archives, scholars, filmmakers and others who comprise the diverse American motion picture community. Explicitly it is composed of up to 5 "at-large" members (with 5 alternates) and 17 member/alternate pairs from the following 18 organizations:

- Academy of Motion Picture Arts and Sciences
- Alliance of Motion Picture and Television Producers
- American Film Institute
- American Society of Cinematographers and International Cinematographers Guild
- Association of Moving Image Archivists
- Directors Guild of America
- Motion Picture Association
- Cinema United
- National Society of Film Critics
- Department of Film and Television of the Tisch School of the Arts at New York University
- Screen Actors Guild-American Federation of Television and Radio Artists
- Society for Cinema and Media Studies
- Society of Composers & Lyricists
- United States members of the International Federation of Film Archives
- University Film and Video Association
- The Department of Film and Television of the School of Theater, Film and Television at the University of California, Los Angeles
- Writers Guild of America

== Relationship with National Film Preservation Foundation ==
The National Film Preservation Foundation was created by the U.S. Congress in 1996, at the recommendation of the Library of Congress, following four years of hearings and research conducted by the National Film Preservation Board. The National Film Preservation Act of 1996 (Public Law 104–285, Title II), signed into law on October 11, 1996 by President Bill Clinton, charged the NFPF to "encourage, accept, and administer private gifts to promote and ensure the preservation and public accessibility of the nation's film heritage" and authorized federal funds to advance this work. The NFPF started operations a year later in 1997 as an independent federally chartered grant-giving public charity and the nonprofit charitable affiliate of the Library of Congress's National Film Preservation Board. Since 1996 Congress has increased the NFPF's authorization twice, in 2005 via the Family Entertainment and Copyright Act of 2005 (Public Law 109-9) and in 2008 via the Library of Congress Sound Recording and Film Preservation Programs Reauthorization Act of 2008 (Public Law 110-336). Funding received through the NFPF's authorization is secured through the Library of Congress and goes directly to the field for film preservation projects.

== See also ==
- National Recording Preservation Board
