= Eldred v. Ashcroft =

- Supreme Court of the United States

Argued October 9, 2002 Decided January 15, 2003
- Full case name: Eric Eldred, et al. v. John Ashcroft, Attorney General
- Docket no.: 01-618
- Citations: 537 U.S. 186 (more) 123 S. Ct. 769, 154 L. Ed. 2d 683, 71 U.S.L.W. 4052
- Decision: Opinion

Case history
- Prior: Eldred v. Reno, 74 F. Supp. 2d 1 (D.D.C. 1999); aff'd, 239 F.3d 372 (D.C. Cir. 2001); rehearing and rehearing en banc denied, 255 F.3d 849 (D.C. Cir. 2001); cert. granted, 534 U.S. 1126 (2002); order granting cert. amended, 534 U.S. 1160 (2002).
- Subsequent: Rehearing denied, 538 U.S. 916 (2003).

Holding
- 20-year retroactive extension of existing copyright terms did not violate the Copyright Clause or the First Amendment of the Constitution.

Court membership
- Chief Justice William Rehnquist Associate Justices John P. Stevens · Sandra Day O'Connor; Antonin Scalia · Anthony Kennedy; David Souter · Clarence Thomas; Ruth Bader Ginsburg · Stephen Breyer

Case opinions
- Majority: Ginsburg, joined by Rehnquist, O'Connor, Scalia, Kennedy, Souter, Thomas
- Dissent: Stevens
- Dissent: Breyer

Laws applied
- U.S. Const. Art. I, § 8, cl. 8; U.S. Const. amend. I; Copyright Term Extension Act of 1998

Eldred v. Ashcroft, 537 U.S. 186 (2003), was a decision by the Supreme Court of the United States upholding the constitutionality of the 1998 Sonny Bono Copyright Term Extension Act (CTEA). Plaintiffs, led by Internet publisher Eric Eldred, argued that the statute was unconstitutional. The Supreme Court disagreed and allowed the statute to remain in effect.

== Background ==
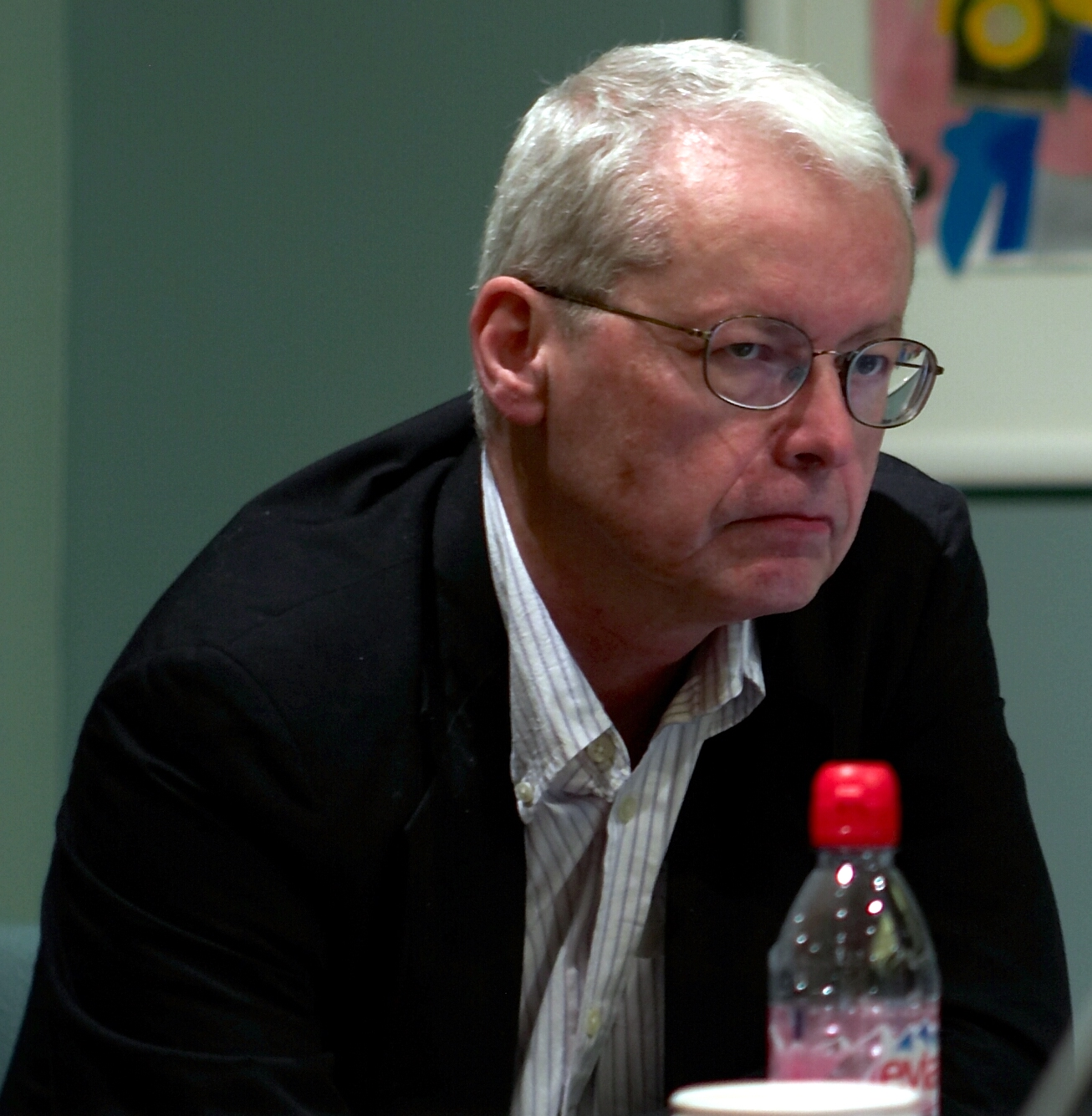
Eric Eldred, the lead plaintiff

The Sonny Bono Copyright Term Extension Act (CTEA) extended existing copyright terms by an additional 20 years from the terms set by the Copyright Act of 1976. The law affected both new and existing works, making it both a prospective extension as well as a retroactive one. Specifically, for works published before January 1, 1978, and still in copyright on October 27, 1998, the term was extended to 95 years. For works authored by individuals on or after January 1, 1978, the copyright term was extended to the life of the author plus 70 years. For works authored by joint authors, the copyright term was extended to the life of the last surviving author plus 70 years. In the case of works-for-hire, anonymous, or pseudonymous works, the term was set at 95 years from the date of first publication, or 120 years from creation.

The practical result of this was to prevent a number of works from entering the public domain in 1998 and following years, as would have occurred under the earlier Copyright Act of 1976. Materials which the plaintiffs had worked with and were ready to republish were now unavailable due to copyright restrictions that did not exist prior to the passage of CTEA.

The lead petitioner was Internet publisher, Eric Eldred. He was joined by a group of commercial and non-commercial interests who relied on the public domain for their work. These included Dover Publications, a commercial publisher of paperback books; and Luck's Music Library, Inc. and Edwin F. Kalmus & Co., Inc., publishers of orchestral sheet music. Many amici briefs were contributed by groups including the Free Software Foundation; Tri-Horn International, a golf publishing and technology company; the American Association of Law Libraries; the Bureau of National Affairs; and the College Art Association.

The U.S. government was represented by the Attorney General in an ex officio capacity (originally Janet Reno, later replaced by John Ashcroft). Several amici briefs supporting CTEA were filed by organizations including the Motion Picture Association of America, the Recording Industry Association of America, ASCAP, and Broadcast Music Incorporated.

== District court ==
The original complaint was filed in the United States District Court for the District of Columbia on January 11, 1999 under the name Eldred v. Reno. The plaintiffs' argument was threefold:

1. That by retroactively extending copyright terms, Congress had violated the requirements of the Constitution's Copyright Clause, which gives Congress the following power:
  To promote the Progress of Science and useful Arts, by securing for limited Times to Authors and Inventors the exclusive Right to their respective Writings and Discoveries
  Plaintiffs argued that by reading this formulation so as to allow for any number of retroactive extensions, Congress could in practice guarantee an unlimited period of copyright protection, thus thwarting the intent of the clause.
2. That any copyright law must be subject to scrutiny under the First Amendment, thereby ensuring a balance between freedom of speech and the interests of copyright.
3. That the doctrine of public trust requires the government to show a public benefit to any transfer of public property into private hands, and that the CTEA violates this doctrine by withdrawing material from the public domain.

In response, the government argued that Congress does indeed have the latitude to retroactively extend terms, so long as the individual extensions are also for "limited Times", as required by the Constitution. As an argument for this position, they referred to the Copyright Act of 1790, the first Federal copyright legislation, which applied Federal protection to existing works. Furthermore, they argued, neither the First Amendment nor the doctrine of public trust is applicable to copyright cases.

On October 28, 1999, Judge June Green issued a brief opinion rejecting all three of the petitioners' arguments. On the first count, she wrote that Congress had the power to extend terms as it wished, as long as the terms themselves were of limited duration. On the second count, she rejected the notion of First Amendment scrutiny in copyright cases, based on her interpretation of Harper and Row Publishers, Inc., v. Nation Enterprises, an earlier Supreme Court decision. On the third count, she rejected the notion that public trust doctrine was applicable to copyright law.

== Court of Appeals ==
The plaintiffs appealed the decision of the district court to the United States Court of Appeals for the District of Columbia Circuit on May 22, 2000. The plaintiffs extended their argument on the copyright clause to note that the clause requires Congress to "promote the Progress of Science and useful Arts", and argued that retroactive extensions do not directly serve this purpose in the standard quid pro quo previously required by the courts. The case was decided on February 16, 2001. The appeals court upheld the decision of the district court in a 2–1 opinion. In his dissent, Judge David Sentelle agreed with the plaintiffs that CTEA was indeed unconstitutional based on the "limited Times" requirement. Supreme Court precedent, he argued, held that one must be able to discern an "outer limit" to a limited power; in the case of retrospective copyright extensions, Congress could continue to extend copyright terms indefinitely through a set of limited extensions, thus rendering the "limited times" requirement meaningless.

Following this ruling, plaintiffs petitioned for a rehearing en banc (in front of the full panel of nine judges). This petition was rejected, 7–2, with Judges Sentelle and David Tatel dissenting.

== Supreme Court opinion ==
On October 11, 2001, the plaintiffs filed a petition for certiorari to the Supreme Court of the United States. Oral arguments were presented on October 9, 2002. Lead counsel for the plaintiff was Lawrence Lessig; the government's case was argued by Solicitor General Theodore Olson. Lessig focused the Plaintiffs' brief to emphasize the Copyright Clause restriction and the First Amendment argument. The decision to emphasize the Copyright Clause argument was based on both the minority opinion of Judge Sentelle at the Appeals court, and on two recent Supreme Court decisions authored by Chief Justice William Rehnquist: United States v. Lopez (1996) and United States v. Morrison (2000).

In both of those decisions, the Supreme Court held Congressional legislation to be unconstitutional, because that legislation exceeded the limits of the Constitution's Commerce Clause. This profound reversal of precedent, Lessig argued, could not be limited to only one of the enumerated powers. If the court felt that it had the power to review legislation under the Commerce Clause, Lessig argued, then the Copyright Clause deserved similar treatment, or at very least a "principled reason" must be stated for according such treatment to only one of the enumerated powers.

On January 15, 2003, the Supreme Court held CTEA to be constitutional in a 7–2 decision. The majority opinion, written by Justice Ruth Bader Ginsburg, relied heavily on the Copyright Acts of 1790, 1831, 1909, and 1976 as precedent for retroactive extensions of copyright terms. One of the arguments supporting CTEA was that life expectancy has significantly increased among the human population since the 18th century, and therefore copyright law needed extending as well. However, the major argument in favor of CTEA was that the Constitution only gave Congress the authority to set a copyright term limit at its discretion, with no further instruction on the time frame of that limit as long as it was not "forever". The Supreme Court declined to address Lessig's contention that Lopez and Morrison offered precedent for enforcing the Copyright Clause, and instead reiterated the lower courts' reasoning that a retroactive term extension can satisfy the "limited Times" provision in the Copyright Clause, as long as the extension itself is limited instead of perpetual. Furthermore, the Court refused to apply the proportionality standards of the Fourteenth Amendment or the free speech standards in the First Amendment to limit Congress's ability to confer copyrights for limited terms.

Another key factor in upholding CTEA was a 1993 European Union (EU) directive instructing EU members to establish a baseline copyright term of life of the author plus 70 years, and to deny this longer term to the works of any non-EU country whose laws did not secure the same extended term. By extending the baseline United States copyright term, Congress sought to ensure that American authors would receive the same copyright protection in Europe as their European counterparts.

Lessig expressed surprise that no decision was authored by Chief Justice Rehnquist or by any of the other four justices who supported the Lopez or Morrison decisions. Lessig later expressed regret that he based his argument on precedent rather than attempting to demonstrate that the weakening of the public domain would cause harm to the economic health of the country.

=== Dissenting opinions ===
Justice Stephen Breyer dissented, arguing that CTEA amounted to a grant of perpetual copyright that undermined the public interest. While the Constitution grants Congress power to extend copyright terms in order to "promote the progress of science and useful arts", CTEA granted precedent to continually renew copyright terms making them last virtually forever. Breyer argued that it is highly unlikely any artist will be more inclined to produce work knowing their great-grandchildren will receive royalties. With regard to retroactive copyright extensions, Breyer considered it foolish to accept the government's argument that income received from royalties allows artists to produce more work saying, "How will extension help today's Noah Webster create new works 50 years after his death?" He also attacked the idea that the fair use defense would efficiently solve the First Amendment issue, as the defense could not help "those who wish to obtain from electronic databases material that is not there", e.g. teachers searching online for material to be used in the class and finding that the ideal material has been deleted from the database due to copyright restrictions.

In a separate dissenting opinion, Justice John Paul Stevens also challenged the virtue of an individual reward from extended copyright term limits, analyzing the question from the perspective of patent law. Stevens argued that the focus on compensation results only in "frustrating the legitimate members of the public who want to make use of it (a completed invention) in a free market". Further, the compelling need to encourage creation is proportionally diminished once a work is already created. Yet while a formula pairing commercial viability to duration of protection may be said to produce more economically efficient results in respect of high-tech inventions with shorter shelf-lives, the same perhaps cannot be said for certain forms of copyrighted works, for which the present value of expenditures relating to creation depend less on scientific equipment and research and development programs and more on unquantifiable creativity.

== Later developments ==
Within a year of the Eldred ruling, it was serving as decisive precedent. Two cases, Luck’s Music Library, Inc. v. Ashcroft and Peters and Golan v. Ashcroft and Peters, challenged the constitutionality of the Uruguay Round Agreements Act on the grounds that its "restoration amendment", which provided copyright restrictions to foreign works that were in the a given country's public domain because foreign works were formerly not copyrightable, violated the First Amendment rights of those Americans who would no longer be able to perform the works without observing copyright. The court cited Eldred and dismissed Luck's Music on the grounds that the First Amendment did not protect the ability to use others' words as much as it does protect one's ability to use their own. The Uruguay Round portion of the Golan ruling survived a motion to dismiss even though its own challenge to CTEA did not. That case culminated in Golan v. Holder (2012), which held that there was nothing in the Constitution preventing the government from taking works out of the public domain.

A 2007 Circuit Court case, Kahle v. Gonzales, worked from the Eldred opinion to argue that a change in copyright law as drastic as the change from opt-in to opt-out required a review in regard to freedom of speech. The plaintiffs, represented by Lawrence Lessig, argued that the limitations placed on speech and expression by copyright restrictions were drastically expanded and possibly too limiting. The Ninth Circuit determined that the argument was too similar to the one adjudicated in Eldred and dismissed the case.

== See also ==
- Copyright
- United States copyright law
- Intellectual property clause
- Public Domain Enhancement Act
- Free culture movement

Related cases

- Golan v. Holder (2012)
- Kahle v. Gonzales (9th Cir. 2007)
