= National Film Preservation Act =

The National Film Preservation Act is the name of several U.S. federal laws relating to the identification, acquisition, storage, and dissemination of "films that are culturally, historically, or aesthetically significant."

== Legislative history ==
=== 1988 ===
The original National Film Preservation Act of 1988 (Public Law 100-446) was part of an appropriations bill for the United States Department of the Interior.

In 1988, as classic films like High Noon and Casablanca were being colorized and other early films were being "time-compressed" by television broadcasters to allow the insertion of more commercials, Representative Robert J. Mrazek, at the urging of the Directors Guild of America, introduced a proposal to protect classic American films from significant alteration without the permission of the films' creators. While the proposal was being considered, the "Mrazek Amendment" generated an intense lobbying campaign against its passage, led on behalf of the major film studios by Jack Valenti, President of the Motion Picture Association of America. At one point, Valenti said the proposal "...puts a spike in the eye of normal House procedure and creates a group which is something out of 1984." The legislation was backed by many members of Hollywood's creative community, including actors Burt Lancaster and James Stewart, directors Steven Spielberg and George Lucas, all of whom wanted to see the integrity of their work preserved without alteration. Ultimately the "moral rights" of the Mrazek amendment prevailed in Congress.

The law specified three tasks:

1. Directs the Librarian of Congress to establish a National Film Registry to register films that are culturally, historically, or aesthetically significant.
2. Prohibits any person from knowingly distributing or exhibiting to the public a film that has been materially altered, or a black and white film that has been colorized and is included in the Registry, unless such films are labeled disclosing specified information.
3. Directs the Librarian to establish in the Library of Congress a National Film Preservation Board."

It was signed into law by President Ronald Reagan on September 27, 1988. The new board of 13 members had to meet within 90 days to select 25 films for the Registry.

Originally, the bill would have barred the marketing of certain colorized films under their original titles, but the studios did not accept this. Instead, if copyright was granted for a colorized version of a film, the Library of Congress would retain a copy of the original.

Television stations would have to add a disclaimer before and after showing a colorized films stating "This is a colorized version of a film originally marketed and distributed to the public in black & white. It has been altered without the participation of the principal director, screenwriter and other creators of the original film."

=== 1992 ===
The National Film Preservation Act of 1992 reauthorized the National Film Preservation Board (NFPB) for four years (Public Law 102-307) and added the requirement for the Librarian of Congress to "study and report to the Congress on the current state of film preservation and restoration activities, including the activities of the Library of Congress and other major film archives in the United States; and (2) establish a comprehensive national film preservation program for motion pictures, in conjunction with other film archivists and copyright owners."

=== 1996 ===
The National Film Preservation Act of 1996 reauthorized the NFPB for an additional seven years (Public Law 104-285), and also created the National Film Preservation Foundation (NFPF) as a charitable organization, although the NFPF is not a government agency.

=== 2005 ===
The National Film Preservation Act of 2005 reauthorized both the NFPB and the NFPF (Public Law 109-009) for an additional four years.

=== 2008 ===
Library of Congress Sound Recording and Film Preservation Programs Reauthorization Act of 2008 reauthorized both the NFPB and the NFPF (Public Law 110-336) until fiscal year 2016.

=== 2016 ===
The Library of Congress Sound Recording and Film Preservation Programs Reauthorization Act of 2016 reauthorized both the NFPB and the NFPF (Public Law 114-217) until fiscal year 2026.
