= Lawrence Lessig 2016 presidential campaign =

Lawrence Lessig for President
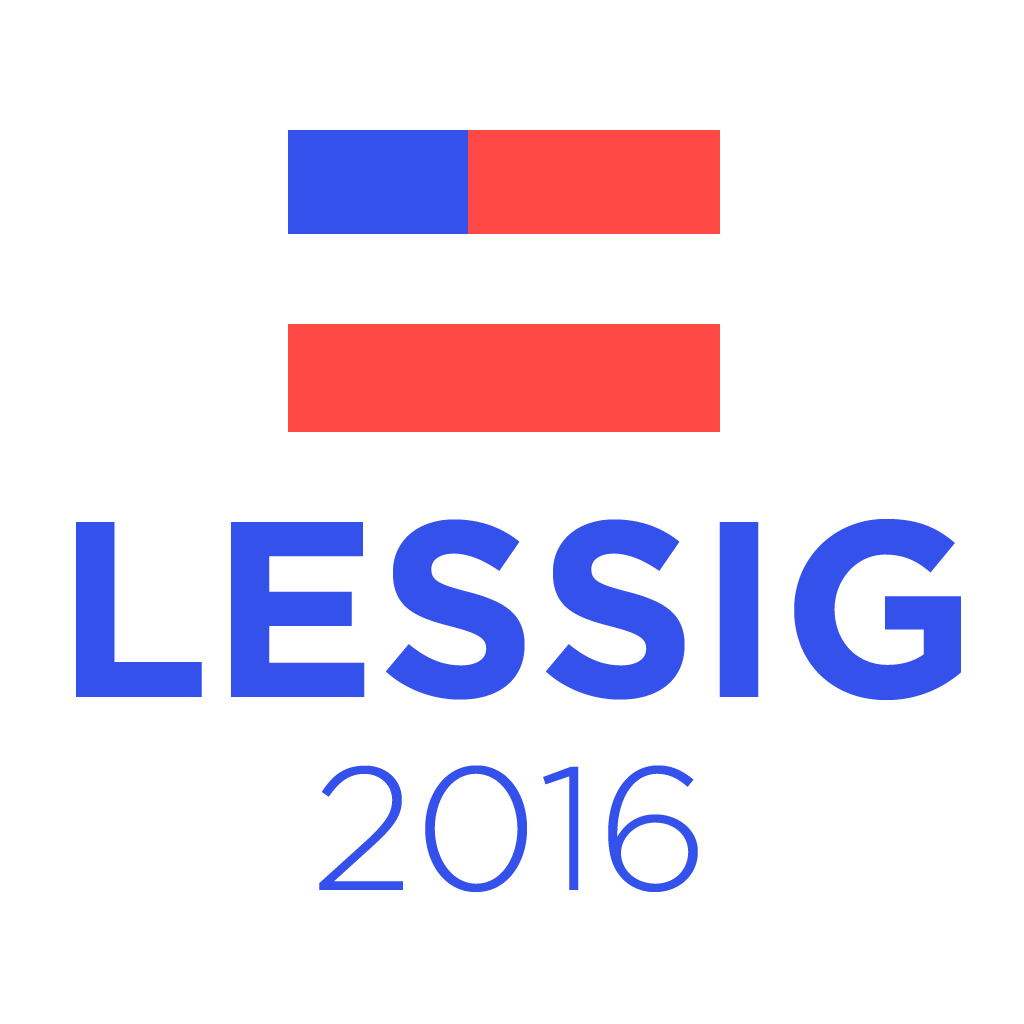
- Campaign: 2016 Democratic Party presidential primaries
- Candidate: Lawrence Lessig; Harvard Professor of Law (2009–present); Founder and CEO, Creative Commons (2001–2007); Founder and Co-director, Stanford Center for Internet and Society (2000–2009); Co-director, Center for the Study of Constitutionalism in Eastern Europe (1991–1997)
- Affiliation: Democratic Party
- EC formed: August 11, 2015
- Announced: September 6, 2015
- Suspended: November 2, 2015
- Headquarters: Cambridge, Massachusetts
- Key people: Steve Jarding (general consultant); Bill Hillsman (media consultant); Richard Dickerson (manager); Drew Westen (message consultant); Adam Bonin (legal counsel); Szelena Gray (media contact)
- Receipts: US$1,016,189
- Slogan: Fixing Democracy Can't Wait
- Chant: Fix Democracy First

Website
- Lessig2016.us

The 2016 presidential campaign of Lawrence Lessig, a law professor at Harvard University and cofounder of Creative Commons, was formally announced on September 6, 2015, as Lessig confirmed his intentions to run for the Democratic Party's nomination for President of the United States in 2016. Lessig had promised to run if his exploratory committee raised $1 million by Labor Day, which it accomplished one day early. He described his candidacy as a referendum on campaign finance reform and electoral reform legislation.

Lessig dropped out of the Democratic primary on November 2, 2015, shortly after the rules for participation in the next debate were changed such that he would no longer qualify. He then considered other strategies to advance his reform agenda, including the possibility of an independent run.

His campaign platform was unique for its clear priority on passing one thing first: the Citizen Equality Act, a proposal that coupled campaign finance reform with other laws aimed at curbing gerrymandering and ensuring voting access.

== Background ==
=== Anti-corruption activism ===
Until his leave of absence to launch his campaign, Lessig was the director of the Edmond J. Safra Center for Ethics at Harvard University. His full-time work on corruption began in 2007, when Lessig announced that he would stop focusing his attention on copyright and related matters and work on political corruption instead. In February 2008, a Facebook group formed by law professor John Palfrey encouraged him to run for Congress from California's 12th congressional district, the seat vacated by the death of U.S. Representative Tom Lantos. Later that month, after forming an "exploratory project", he decided not to run for the vacant seat.

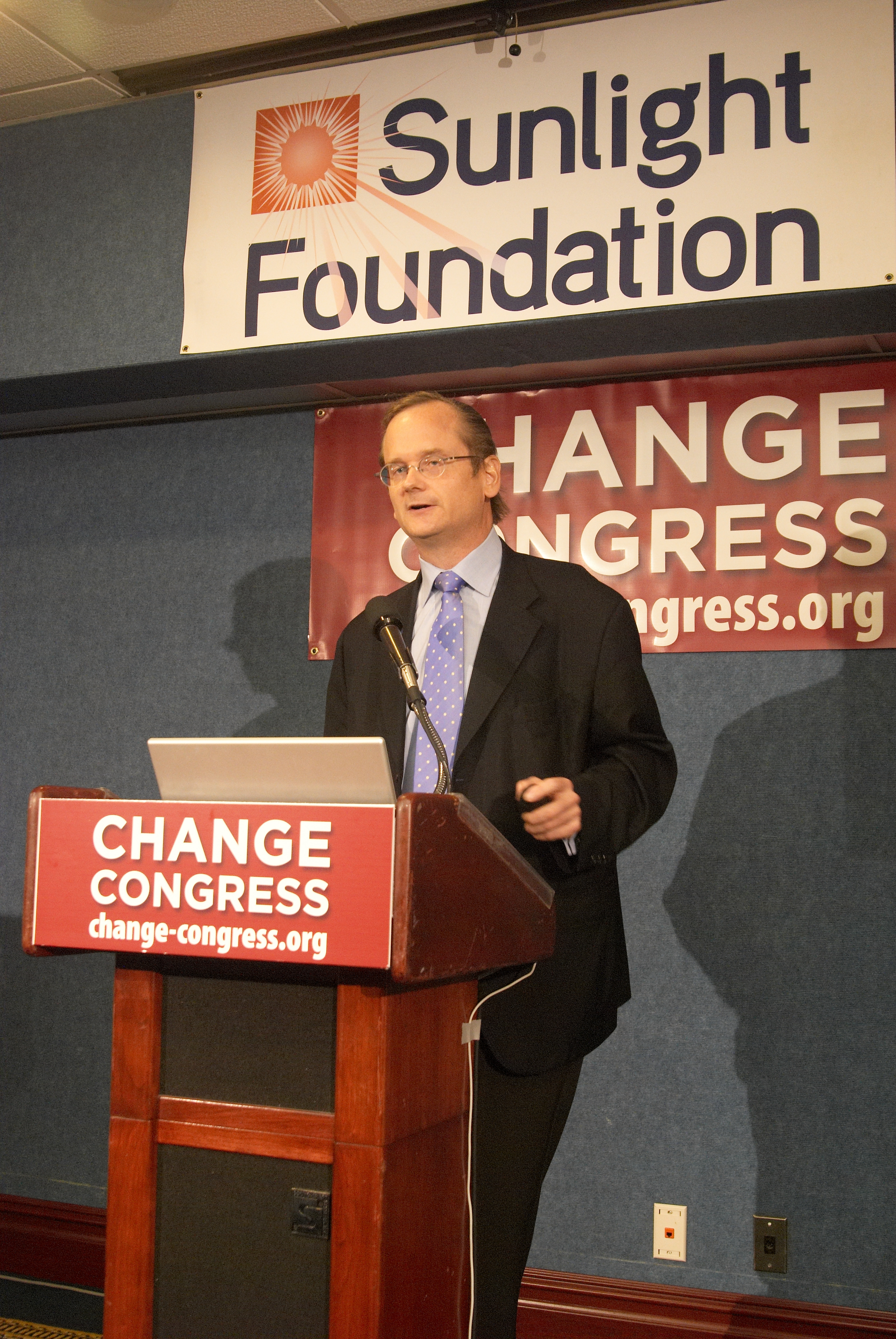
Lessig speaking before Change Congress and the Sunlight Foundation

Despite having decided to forgo running for Congress himself, Lessig remained interested in attempting to change Congress to reduce corruption. To this end, he worked with political consultant Joe Trippi to launch a web based project called "Change Congress". In 2010, Lessig began to organize for a national constitutional convention, co-founding Fix Congress First!, again with Joe Trippi. He called for a convention to propose amendments to the United States Constitution both in a September 24–25, 2011, conference co-chaired by the Tea Party Patriots' national coordinator, and at an October 2011 Occupy protest in Washington, DC. Reporter Dan Froomkin said his 2011 book, Republic, Lost: How Money Corrupts Congress—and a Plan to Stop It, offers a manifesto for the Occupy Wall Street protestors, focusing on the core problem of corruption in both political parties and their elections. Lessig also co-founded Rootstrikers, another project to help volunteers to address the problem of money in politics.

The New Hampshire Rebellion, likewise co-founded by Lessig, is a walk to raise awareness about corruption in politics. The event began in 2014 with a 185-mile march in New Hampshire. From Jan 11 until January 24, 2014, Larry Lessig and many others, like New York activist Jeff Kurzon, marched from Dixville Notch, New Hampshire to Nashua NH (a 185-mile march) to promote the idea of tackling "The Systemic Corruption in Washington." Lessig chose this language over the related term "campaign finance reform," commenting that "Saying we need campaign finance reform is like referring to an alcoholic as someone who has a liquid intake problem." The walk was to continue the work of NH Native Doris "Granny D" Haddock, and in honor of deceased activist Aaron Swartz. In its second year the walk expanded to include other locations in New Hampshire.

In May 2014, Lessig launched a crowd-funded political action committee which he termed Mayday PAC with the purpose of electing candidates to Congress who would pass campaign finance reform. He is on the boards of MapLight and Represent.us. He serves on the advisory boards of the Democracy Café and the Sunlight Foundation. Lessig's TED talks explaining the corruption of Congress and how to stop it have been viewed by millions.

=== Referendum president concept ===
Lessig laid out the concept of a "reform president," one of four strategies for passing fundamental reform through a corrupted Congress, in his 2011 book, Republic, Lost:

How could a candidate for president credibly signal to the American public that his or her exclusive focus would be to remove this fundamental corruption from our government? ... Here's one path: Imagine a candidate—a credible nonpolitician ... The candidate makes a single two-part pledge: if elected, she will (1) hold the government hostage until Congress enacts a program to remove the fundamental corruption that is our government, and (2) once that program is enacted, she will resign.

In a June 5, 2015 article titled, "Frodo Baggins for President," Lessig elaborated on this idea, suggesting Colin Powell, Bill Bradley, David Walker, Bill Gates, Christine Todd Whitman, Jerry Brown, Joe Scarborough, and Robert Reich as candidates who could run this way, implementing his idea of "the presidency as referendum." Just days later, however, activist journalist Cenk Uygur argued in the Huffington Post that Lessig should implement his own strategy as a "Citizen President."

=== Exploratory committee ===
On August 11, 2015, Lessig announced the formation of an exploratory committee in preparation for a possible bid for the Democratic Party's nomination for President of the United States in 2016. Lessig vowed that if his committee could raise one million dollars by Labor Day 2015, and if the leading Democratic candidates for president had not yet committed to fundamental elections reform as their first priority, he would run for president. The announcement was widely reported in national media outlets, and was timed to coincide with a media blitz by the Lessig 2016 Campaign. Lessig was interviewed in The New York Times and Bloomberg. Campaign messages and Lessig's electoral finance reform positions were circulated widely on social media.

Lessig has stated that if elected president he would resign in favor of his vice president when he accomplishes his three stated objectives, which involve addressing campaign finance reform, voting rights issues and political gerrymandering. Prior to his dropping out of the race, he had yet to announce his vice presidential running mate, which he said would have been decided at the Democratic National Convention.

== Campaign ==
=== Launch ===
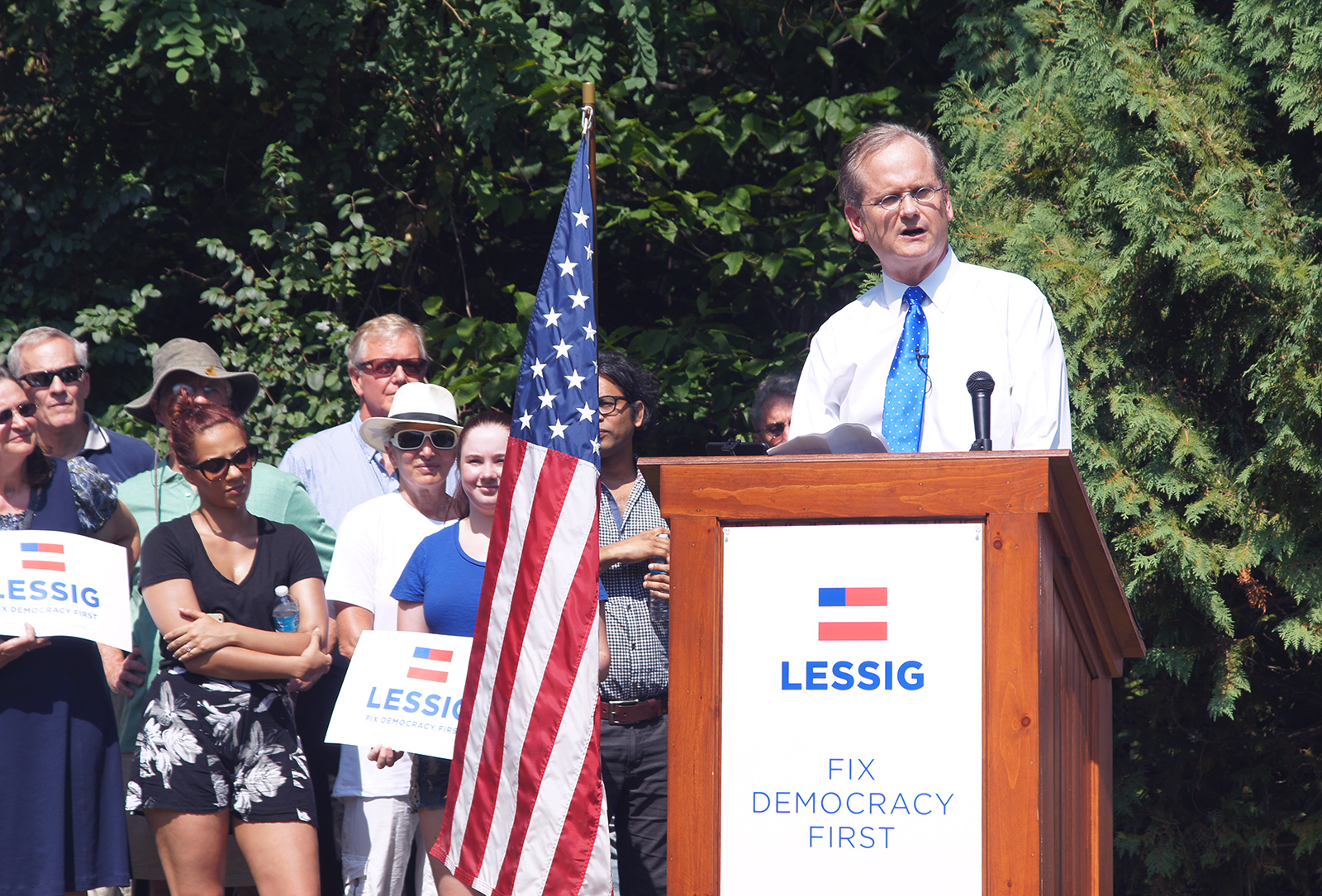
Lawrence Lessig launching his presidential campaign September 9, 2015 in Claremont, NH.

Lessig reached his intended crowdfunding goal of $1 million on September 6, 2015. On his website later that day, Lessig announced his intention to enter the presidential race. The headquarters of the campaign is in Cambridge, Massachusetts. He officially launched his campaign on September 9, 2015, in Claremont, New Hampshire. Just over a week later, he spoke at the New Hampshire Democratic Party State Convention.

As of September 2015, intended New Hampshire Democratic primary voters gave Lessig one percent of the vote.

=== Debates ===
Lessig was excluded from the first Democratic debate on CNN, after having criticized the requirement that Democratic candidates must earn at least 1% in three major national polls in the six weeks before the debate. Lessig's criticism was centered on the fact that he was excluded from most polls because the Democratic National Committee (DNC) did not officially welcome him to the campaign as it had done for all five other candidates. In the two weeks following his announcement, Lessig was only included in one national poll, in which he met the 1% requirement; other national polls had included Vice President Biden, who, at the time, had yet to announce whether he was running. The day before the CNN debate, the Bloomberg Editorial Board published an editorial entitled, "Let All the Candidates Debate, Democrats," calling for the DNC to include Lessig in the debate.

=== "All in" ===
On October 16, 2015, due to poor polling on the resignation part of his plan as well as the DNC's non-recognition of his candidacy, Lessig announced on Real Time with Bill Maher that he was dropping the promise to resign after passing the Citizen Equality Act. He elaborated on his decision in an online article for The Atlantic released the following day. Lessig explained that he would now outline his positions on every issue, just like any other campaign, planning to serve a full term as president after fixing democracy first.

=== Out ===
On November 2, 2015, Lessig suspended his presidential campaign in a video statement. He cited his inability to get one percent support in the polls and being unrepresented in the debates, saying, "I am not well-known to the American public generally." In an essay in the New York Times he further discussed the DNC's change of the one percent rule from "within six weeks" to "earlier than six weeks" to a "five-week period (that) just happened to be crafted to exclude the third poll finding me at one percent".

== Political positions ==
=== Equal citizenship – the first reform ===
Lessig's campaign stated that progress was effectively impossible with the state of political inequality, because members of Congress are reliant on a small number of major donors they need to win elections. Lessig called his Citizen Equality Act "The First Reform," which he said makes the other urgently needed reforms possible. It would:

- Restore and strengthen voting rights (including automatic registration and making election day a holiday);
- End gerrymandering, replacing current single-member districts with independently determined, multi-member districts in which ranked choice voting is used to achieve better representation of all citizens' views;
- Establish "citizen-funded elections," in which each citizen is given a voucher to distribute public funding in a decentralized way, with matching funds for small donations out of pocket as well; and
- Put strong limits on the revolving door between government work and lobbying.

The details of the Act sought public input to improve it.

=== Environment ===
The urgent need to address climate change was one of the primary factors motivating Lessig to run for president. He supported a carbon tax on companies that are not able to clean the pollution that they have created. He also supported the other policies Democratic presidential candidates proposed, but he argued that a carbon tax would render most of them unnecessary. He also argued that enacting the Citizen Equality Act is essential to make addressing climate change possible because fossil fuel interests used their political influence to block it.

=== The Internet ===
Lessig is a strong supporter of Network neutrality, and an equally and broadly deployed Internet in general. He has a long history of supporting digital rights—for example, he helped found Creative Commons which advocates for the expansion of free and creative materials available to all. Lessig has also served on the boards of the Electronic Frontier Foundation and the Free Software Foundation. His active interest in defending the Internet stems from his 1997 participation in a major lawsuit against Microsoft for trying to use its Windows monopoly to take over web standards.

=== Government surveillance ===
Lessig believes that the Fourth Amendment should prevent government agencies from suspicion-less searches and unwarranted invasion of privacy. He pledged to stop NSA surveillance of American citizens and respect the privacy of non-US persons. Lessig believed that Edward Snowden was a hero and exposed government crimes after finding every available legal channel closed.

=== Healthcare ===
Lessig supported the Patient Protection and Affordable Care Act. Although he voiced strong support, he also believed that legislation should be passed that adds a public option to the insurance mandate and repeals the ban on the government negotiating for lower drug prices. Lessig proposed prize funding drug research and banning drug companies from negotiating with generic drug providers to delay entry into the market.

=== Criminal justice reform ===
Lessig has stated that the criminal justice system is an "embarrassment to our tradition and our values." He criticized the Supreme Court for giving broad deference to police departments and argued in favor of criminal justice reform. Some of his proposals include: comprehensive reform of the mandatory minimum system, prosecution of white collar crimes that focus on people instead of corporations, banning practices that make guilty verdicts positive, ending felon disenfranchisement, and rooting out corruption in the government.

=== Foreign policy ===
Lessig stated that "I am not a utopian. I am not a pacifist. I believe in military intervention to defend our people and for the cause of justice and humanity." He criticized the Iraq War for creating more critics than allies and helping recruit more terrorists. He also was a cautious but optimistic supporter of the nuclear deal with Iran. Lessig did not support the commitment of ground troops to Syria but instead suggested working with allies to create safe zones for refugees. He supported a similar policy in the fight against ISIS. Another important issue for Lessig was long-term relations with China. He stated that it was time for us to treat China as equals, working on problems such as climate change together.

=== Education ===
Believing that "we all gain from an educated people" Lessig supports subsidized education. Citing the current student debt at 1.2 trillion dollars he supports legislation that would reduce existing student debt and refinance loans to lower rates. Along with his support for free educational material on the Internet, Lessig would also push Congress to support open materials for scientific and educational pursuits. His Citizen's Equality Act proposes to weaken the influence of lobbyists on the education system.

=== Immigration reform ===
Lessig supported passage of the DREAM Act and the ending of inhumane detention centers, as well as comprehensive immigration reform including a "speedy" path to citizenship.

=== Innovation policy ===
Lessig supports copyright laws but believes that there must be fundamental changes. If elected, he pledged to convene an impartial Creative Rights Commission to create new copyright laws that allow more open access of information. He also has a similar proposal for an Invention Commission for changes to the current patent laws. His final proposal was to create an Innovation Council that reviews copyright and patent policies to make sure that they achieve their goals. Lessig has written several books on intellectual property, and in 2002 argued in front of the Supreme Court for copyright limitations.

=== War on drugs ===
Lessig supports the legalization of marijuana and would explore decriminalizing other controlled substances. Lessig would also institute other policies to treat addiction as a disease, offering the compassion and support that people often need to free themselves from it. His website refers to the war on drugs as "The So-Called 'War on Drugs'" and the most destructive war since the Civil War. He compared it to alcohol prohibition and cites the costs in American lives, damage to civil rights in the U.S., and loss of democracy and security in some South and Central American countries.

== Endorsements ==
Note: Lessig suspended his campaign on November 2, 2015

Internet, radio and television personalities

- Dylan Ratigan, former host of MSNBC's The Dylan Ratigan Show

Individuals

- J. J. Abrams, director
- David Brin, scientist and writer
- Ophelia Dahl, co-founder of Partners In Health
- Michael Eisen, biologist and co-founder of Public Library of Science (PLOS)
- Joi Ito, Director of the MIT Media Lab
- Brewster Kahle, founder of the Internet Archive
- Miguel de Icaza, founder of GNOME and Mono (software)
- James Kwak, professor and blogger
- Quinn Norton, journalist and photographer
- Jimmy Wales, internet entrepreneur, Wikipedia founder
- Ethan Zuckerman, internet activist and director of the MIT Center for Civic Media

Leaders in Business

- Arnold Hiatt, former president of the Stride Rite footwear company
- Matt Mullenweg, developer of WordPress
- Ev Williams, co-founder of Twitter

Celebrities

- Bryan Callen, actor and comedian
- Shepard Fairey, street artist and activist
- Matt Korklan, professional wrestler
- Krist Novoselic, Nirvana bassist and co-founder, FairVote board chair

== See also ==
- 2016 United States presidential election
- Democratic Party presidential primaries, 2016
