= One Way Forward =

2012 book by Lawrence Lessig

- Author: Lawrence Lessig
- Publisher: Byliner
- Publication date: February 12, 2012
- Media type: eBook
- Pages: ~72 pp.
- OCLC: 796841318

One Way Forward: The Outsider's Guide to Fixing the Republic is the seventh book by Lawrence Lessig, a Harvard law professor and activist concerned about the excessive influence of corporate money in politics. One Way Forward describes his discussions with activists in the Tea Party and Occupy Wall Street. He says the two groups have a lot in common, including a concern for the future of the US and a willingness to devote substantial amounts of time and possibly money to do what they think is likely to fix the worst of the problems.

They also share a counterproductive tendency to label as "treasonous" anyone who suggests talking with the other side. Lessig says that together these different groups can fix the biggest problem facing the US today, namely the excessive influence of corporate money in politics, also called crony capitalism or corporate welfare. However, all sides must first find ways to listen to the others to find their common ground.

Lessig hopes this book will help catalyze a needed rapprochement between different groups, encouraging them to listen to the others and find their common grounds. If they can do that, they can produce much needed change in the political economy of the US and possibly the world.

To facilitate this, Lessig writes, "After a short period, and assuming the book takes hold, I will license it freely, and based on the feedback (at oneway.lessig.org), draft version two. That second version will be licensed freely from the start, and will live on a wiki. That means that no single one of us will own it, but that all of us will be able to direct it."

== Chapters ==
=== Chapter 1: Prologue ===
US politics are typically described as Right vs. Left / conservative vs. liberal. However, the "Inside" thwarts reforms for all "Outsiders".

MoveOn began in 1998 as "a cross-partisan player and the only adult in the field" during the Monica Lewinsky scandal. The movement grew from one or two people to thousands in a few days, surprising everyone, especially the Insiders. Hundreds of volunteers attended over 300 meetings with members of congress. In so doing, they challenged the conventional Insider wisdom that volunteers cannot be effective in political lobbying.

Insiders were also surprised by Obama's performance in 2008 and more recently by the Tea Party, the international Occupy movement, and the SOPA / PROTECT IP Act protests.

=== Chapter 2: Passionate ===
The Tea Party, Occupy, Move to Amend and similar groups have attracted many people who are very passionate in their concerns and willing to devote substantial amounts of time and money to try to fix what they see wrong.

=== Chapter 3: Polarized ===
Lessig spoke with activists with the Tea Party, Occupy Wall Street and others. He believes that together they have the energy and commitment needed create much needed change. However, their progress is currently prevented by a tendency to claim that talking with the "other" is treason.

=== Chapter 4: Potential ===
People right, left, and center are concerned about crony capitalism. Before we can solve problems of concern to all, we must do the following:

1. Identify effective reform(s) we can agree upon
2. Leverage our common passion to support this
3. Without denying our differences.

Lessig described a teach-in he gave at Occupy K Street, where he implored the Occupiers to invite Tea Partiers to collaborate against crony capitalism. A man in the audience said he ran a site "AgainstCronyCapitalsim.org".. He assured the audience that thousands of Tea Partiers would join them in a fight against crony capitalism. Then Dave Zirin, a sportswriter for The Nation, started tweeting and blogging that, "We should not be collaborating with the racists from the Tea Party."

Lessig insists that we can either (a) remain separate and ineffective or (b) squelch the inflammatory condemnations of the "others" and build a coalition to reduce crony capitalism and make the government "dependent on the people alone", as James Madison wrote in Federalist paper No. 52.

The difference today between Left and Right today is nowhere nearly as profound as slavery was.. If our forebears could fix that, we should be able to fix our current problems with crony capitalism.

=== Chapter 5: Problem ===
In Republic, Lost, Lessig documented why he thinks that crony capitalism is the gateway problem in the sense that we must fix that problem before we can fix any of the other major problems facing the nation today. The analysis in this book is summarized in the accompanying diagram: Current law in the US include many provisions that expire after a few years. This provides an essentially infinite supply of opportunities for calling lobbyists and major corporate contributors to "extort" (Lessig's term) money from them to extend their special provisions. Most incumbent politicians (at least at the federal level in the US) know that they need huge amounts of money primarily to buy television advertising and research on how to sell their candidacy to the public – and virtually the only way for most of them to get that money is to spend between 30 and 70 percent of their time on the phone asking for it.

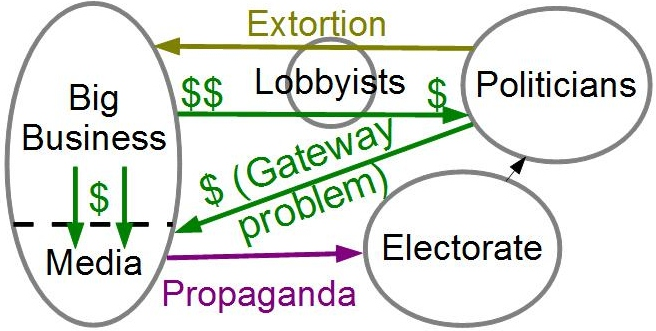
Diagram of the corrupt system described in Republic, Lost

This diagram suggests a candidate for the gateway problem not discussed by Lessig: The reliance of the public on the major media conglomerates. This aspect of the problem has been discussed by media scholar Robert W. McChesney in his books on The Problem of the Media: U.S. Communication Politics in the 21st Century, and Tragedy and Farce: How the American Media Sell Wars, Spin Elections, and Destroy Democracy. His proposed solution includes public funding of substantive investigative journalism, which could be implemented in a way consistent with Lessig's proposed "Grant and Franklin" project for public funding of political campaigns controlled by individual taxpayers; see The Death and Life of American Journalism: The Media Revolution that Will Begin the World Again.

McChesney noted that the media consolidation in the US during the 1990s was accompanied by the near elimination of investigative journalism, especially from mainstream commercial broadcasting. A number of investigative journalism organizations have arisen to try to fill this gap, some of which are part of the Investigative News Network.

OpenSecrets has a database that can be mined for information tying money to specific actions (or inactions) by the US congress. More research in this area could potentially increase public awareness of the problem. Research on this problem has been done by liberals like Ralph Nader, Public Citizen, and Common Cause and conservatives like the Cato Institute.

=== Chapter 6: Plan ===
Lessig asks citizens to engage congress, the president and the constitution. He suggests that citizens ask legislators to support publicly funded elections, to limit and make transparent independent political expenditures, and to reaffirm that "unalienable rights" belong to natural persons only. He suggests that citizens further attempt to elect a presidential candidate that will lead the charge for change. To this end, he supports "AmericansElect.org".. He also suggests calling a constitutional convention for the limited purpose of drafting an amendment to dramatically reduce the corrupting influence of money in politics (see "CallAConvention.org".).

He further suggests we need to engage people who are different. If you support the Occupy movement, try listening to some Tea Party Patriots, and vice versa. If you're a Republican, how well do you understand the Democrats, and vice versa? The goal is NOT to convert the other but rather to find common ground by first listening respectfully.

== Conclusion ==
The 2008 global economic crisis hit Iceland much harder than the US. The Icelandic government proposed a bail out of their major banks, which was rejected by 98% of voters. "So the citizens of Iceland launched the most ambitious crowdsourced-sovereignty project in modern history." The impact of the proposed "crowdsourced constitution" is still uncertain, but the Icelandic economy seems to be recovering fairly well from the "2008–2012 Icelandic financial crisis". Lessig insists that if the citizens of Iceland can stand up to their government like this, people in the US can do so also.

== Afterward and acknowledgments ==
A poll conducted immediately after the Citizens United decision of the US Supreme Court found that 80 percent of those polled opposed the decision. Justice Stevens in his dissent from this decision wrote that, "While American democracy is imperfect, few outside ... this court thought its flaws included a dearth of corporate money in politics."

After a short period of time, Lessig plans to make a version of "One Way Forward" on a wiki at Lessig, Lawrence (2012). "oneway.lessig.org".. At that point, the document will be available for the public to edit similar to how Wikipedia is managed.

One thing that anyone can do is take "The Anti-Corruption Pledge "

== Appendix ==
Lessig provides proposed language for a constitutional amendment. His language explicitly authorizes public funding of political campaigns and public but content neutral regulation of money spent on political speech. Apart from this book, Lessig supports the Rootstrikers organization, which tries to bring together people of differing political persuasions hoping to find common ground.

Other proposals have been made for constitutional amendments to overturn Citizens United. The League of Women Voters's web site provides a brief comparison of key features of different constitutional amendments proposed as of mid-2012. As of November 12, 2012, this analysis compared 14 different joint resolutions introduced so far in the U.S. House or Senate.

Beyond this, Move to Amend has offered their own language saying in essence that (1) a corporation is not a person and (2) money is not speech. The Move to Amend web site includes their comparison of similar amendments proposed by members of the U.S. House and Senate. Public Citizen and Common Cause also support amending the constitution to overturn the Citizens United decision.

Lessig's proposal presented in this Appendix seems to be the only prominent proposed amendment at the moment considering public funding for political campaigns.
