= Lawrence Lessig =

American legal scholar and activist (born 1961)

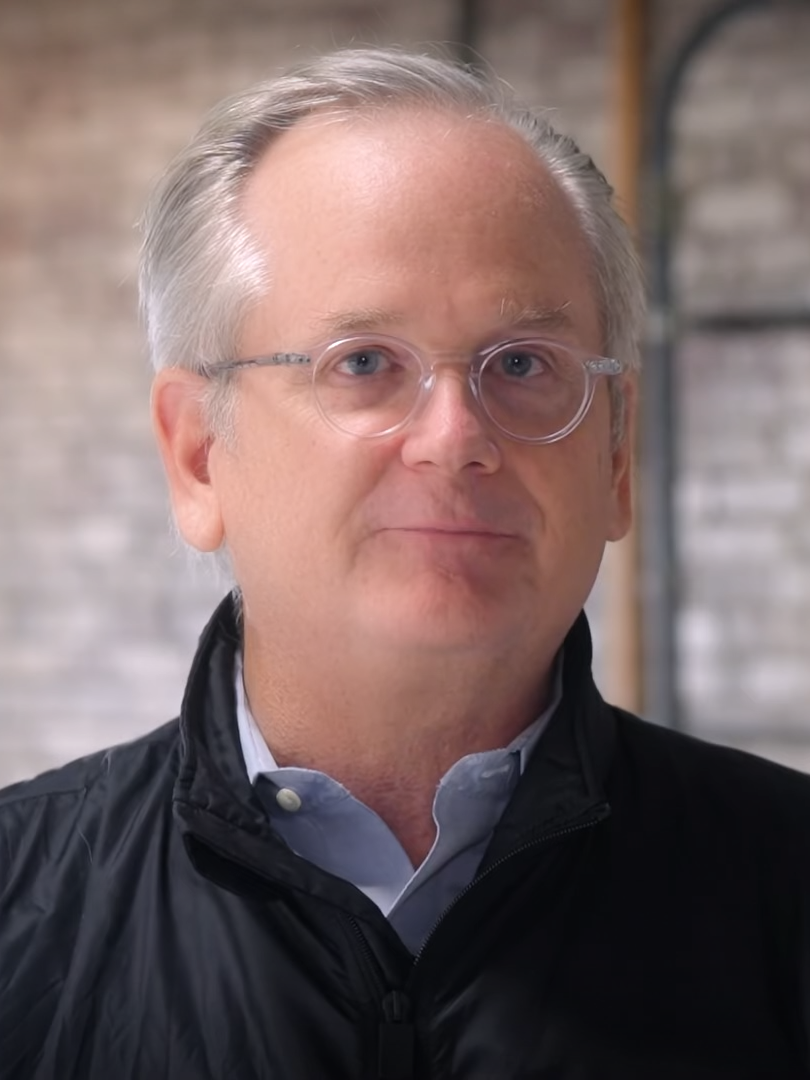
- Lessig in 2024
- Born: Lester Lawrence Lessig III; June 3, 1961 (age 65); Rapid City, South Dakota, U.S.
- Education: University of Pennsylvania (BA, BS); Trinity College, Cambridge (MA); Yale University (JD)
- Known for: founding Creative Commons and Equal Citizens
- Political party: Democratic
- Movement: Free-culture movement; electoral reform movement
- Spouse: Bettina Neuefeind (m. 1999)
- Children: 3
- Website: Official website

Lester Lawrence "Larry" Lessig III (born June 3, 1961) is an American legal scholar and political activist. He is the Roy L. Furman Professor of Law at Harvard Law School and the former director of the Edmond J. Safra Center for Ethics at Harvard University. He is the founder of Creative Commons and Equal Citizens. Lessig was a candidate for the Democratic Party's nomination for president of the United States in the 2016 U.S. presidential election but withdrew before the primaries.

== Life and career ==
Interview with Lessig in 2009

Lessig was born on June 3, 1961, in Rapid City, South Dakota, to Lester Lawrence "Jack" Lessig II (1929–2020) who was an engineer and Patricia "Pat" West Lessig (1930–2019), a real estate agent. He has two older step-siblings, Robert (died 2019) and Kitty, and a younger biological sister, Leslie. He grew up in Williamsport, Pennsylvania. He graduated from the University of Pennsylvania in 1983 with a double degree B.A. in economics and a B.S. in management. He then studied philosophy at Trinity College, Cambridge, receiving a M.A. in 1986. Lessig then returned to the United States to attend law school. He did his first year at the University of Chicago Law School before transferring to Yale Law School, and graduated in 1989 with a J.D. degree.

After graduation from law school, Lessig was a law clerk for Judge Richard Posner of the U.S. Court of Appeals for the Seventh Circuit from 1989 to 1990, and then for Justice Antonin Scalia of the U.S. Supreme Court from 1990 to 1991. Lessig started his academic career at the University of Chicago Law School, where he was professor from 1991 to 1997. As co-director of its Center for the Study of Constitutionalism in Eastern Europe, he helped the newly independent Republic of Georgia draft a constitution. From 1997 to 2000, he was at Harvard Law School, holding for a year the chair of Berkman Professor of Law, affiliated with the Berkman Klein Center for Internet & Society. He subsequently joined Stanford Law School, where he established the Stanford Center for Internet and Society.

Lessig returned to Harvard in July 2009 as professor and director of the Edmond J. Safra Center for Ethics. In 2013, Lessig was appointed as the Roy L. Furman Professor of Law and Leadership at Harvard; his chair lecture was entitled "Aaron's Laws: Law and Justice in a Digital Age".

== Views ==
Lessig is a proponent of reduced legal restrictions on copyright, trademark, and radio frequency spectrum, particularly in technology applications. In 2001, he founded Creative Commons, a nonprofit organization devoted to expanding the range of creative works available for others to build upon and to share legally. Prior to his most recent appointment at Harvard, he was a professor of law at Stanford Law School, where he founded the Stanford Center for Internet and Society, and at the University of Chicago. He is a former board member of the Free Software Foundation and Software Freedom Law Center; the Washington, D.C. lobbying groups Public Knowledge and Free Press; and the Electronic Frontier Foundation. He was elected to the American Philosophical Society in 2007.

As a political activist, Lessig called for state-based activism to promote substantive reform of government with a Second Constitutional Convention. In May 2014, he launched a crowd-funded political action committee that he entitled Mayday PAC, with the purpose of electing candidates to Congress who would pass campaign finance reform. Lessig is also the co-founder of Rootstrikers, and is on the boards of MapLight and Represent.Us. He serves on the advisory boards of the Democracy Café, as well as the Sunlight Foundation.

In August 2015, Lessig announced that he was exploring a possible candidacy for president of the United States, promising to run if his exploratory committee raised $1 million by Labor Day. After accomplishing this, on September 6, 2015, Lessig announced that he was entering the race to become a candidate for the 2016 Democratic Party presidential nomination. Lessig described his candidacy as a referendum on campaign finance reform and electoral reform legislation. He stated that, if elected, he would serve a full term as president with his proposed reforms as his legislative priorities. He ended his campaign in November 2015, citing rule changes from the Democratic Party that precluded him from appearing in the televised debates.

In December 2021, Lessig joined the a group of students of an Arizona College for a hunger strike outside The White House. The group focused on demanding that congress passed The Freedom To Vote Act.

== Political background ==
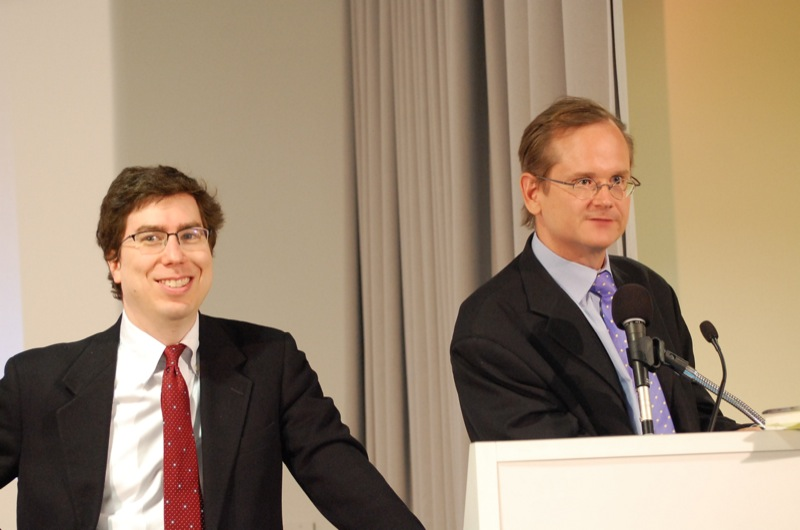
Harvard internet law professor Jonathan Zittrain and Lessig in 2008

Lessig emphasized in interviews that his study of philosophy at Cambridge radically changed his values and career path. Previously, he had held strong conservative or libertarian political views, desired a career in business, was a highly active member of Teenage Republicans, served as the 1978 youth governor for Pennsylvania through the YMCA Youth and Government program, and almost pursued a Republican political career. Since studying philosophy at Cambridge in the mid-1980s, Lessig has been politically liberal. What was intended to be a year abroad at Cambridge convinced him instead to stay another two years to complete an undergraduate degree in philosophy and develop his changing political values. During this time, he also traveled in the Eastern Bloc, where he acquired a lifelong interest in Eastern European law and politics.

By the late 1980s, two influential conservative judges, Judge Richard Posner and Justice Antonin Scalia, selected him to serve as a law clerk, choosing him because they considered him brilliant rather than for his ideology, and effectively making him the "token liberal" on their respective staffs. Posner would later call Lessig "the most distinguished law professor of his generation". Lessig remains skeptical of government intervention, but favors some regulation, calling himself "a constitutionalist". On one occasion, Lessig also commended the John McCain campaign for discussing fair use rights in a letter to YouTube where it took issue with YouTube for indulging overreaching copyright claims that led to the removal of various campaign videos.

== Internet and computer activism ==
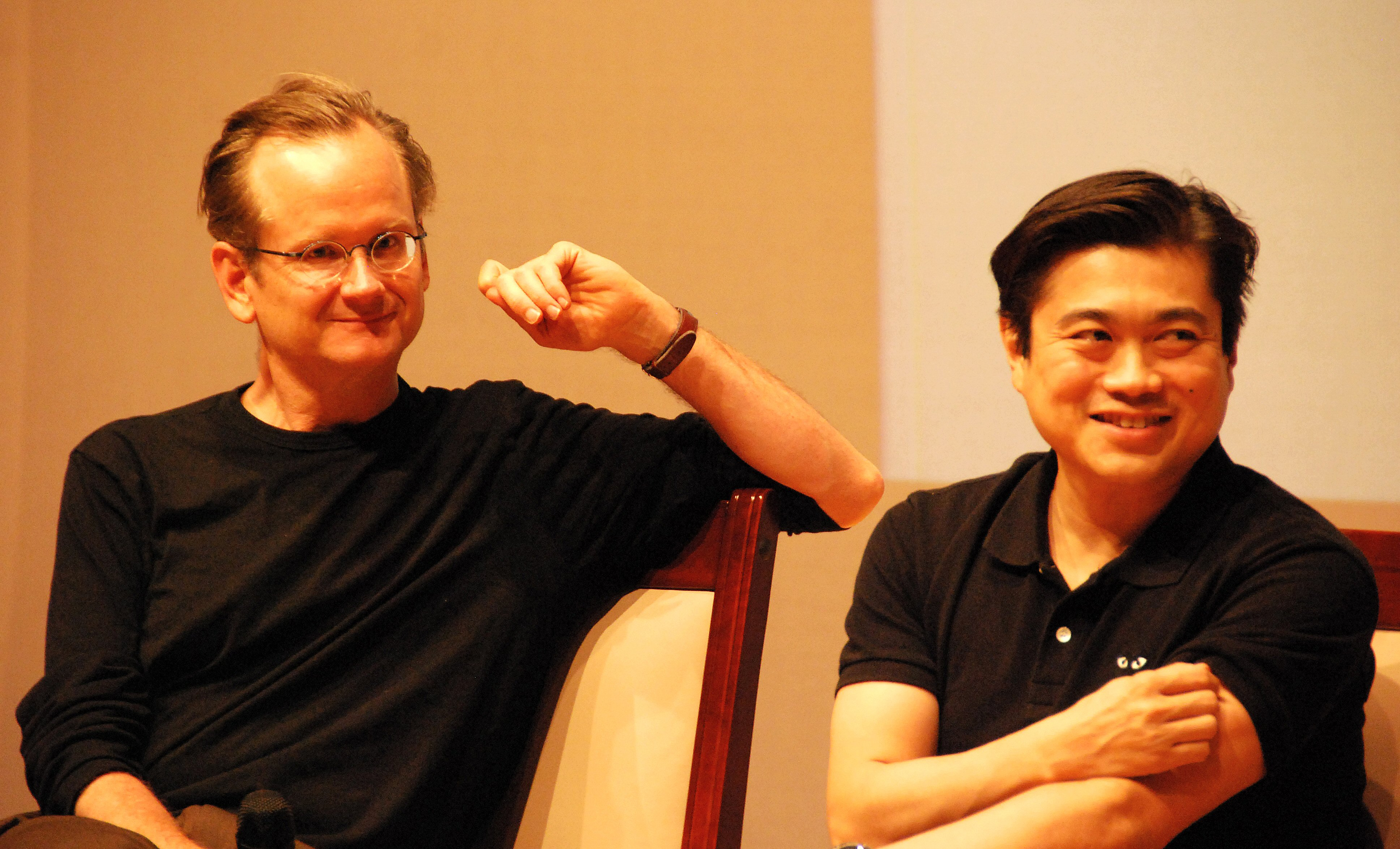
Lessig with fellow Creative Commons board member Joi Ito

=== "Code is law" ===
In computer science, "code" typically refers to the text of a computer program (the source code). In law, "code" may refer to the texts that constitute statutory law. In his 1999 book entitled Code and Other Laws of Cyberspace, Lessig explores the ways in which code can be instruments for social control in both senses, leading to his dictum that "Code is law". Lessig later updated his work in order to keep up with the prevailing views of the time and released the book as Code: Version 2.0 in December 2006.

=== Remix culture ===
Lessig has been a proponent of the remix culture since the early 2000s. In his 2008 book entitled, Remix, he presents this as a desirable cultural practice distinct from piracy. Lessig further articulates remix culture as intrinsic to technology and the Internet. Remix culture is therefore an amalgam of practice, creativity, "read/write" culture, and the hybrid economy. According to Lessig, the problem with the remix comes when it is at odds with stringent U.S. copyright law. He has compared this to the failure of prohibition, both in its ineffectiveness and in its tendency to normalize criminal behavior. Instead he proposes more lenient licensing, namely Creative Commons licenses, as a remedy to maintain "rule of law" while combating plagiarism.

=== Free culture ===
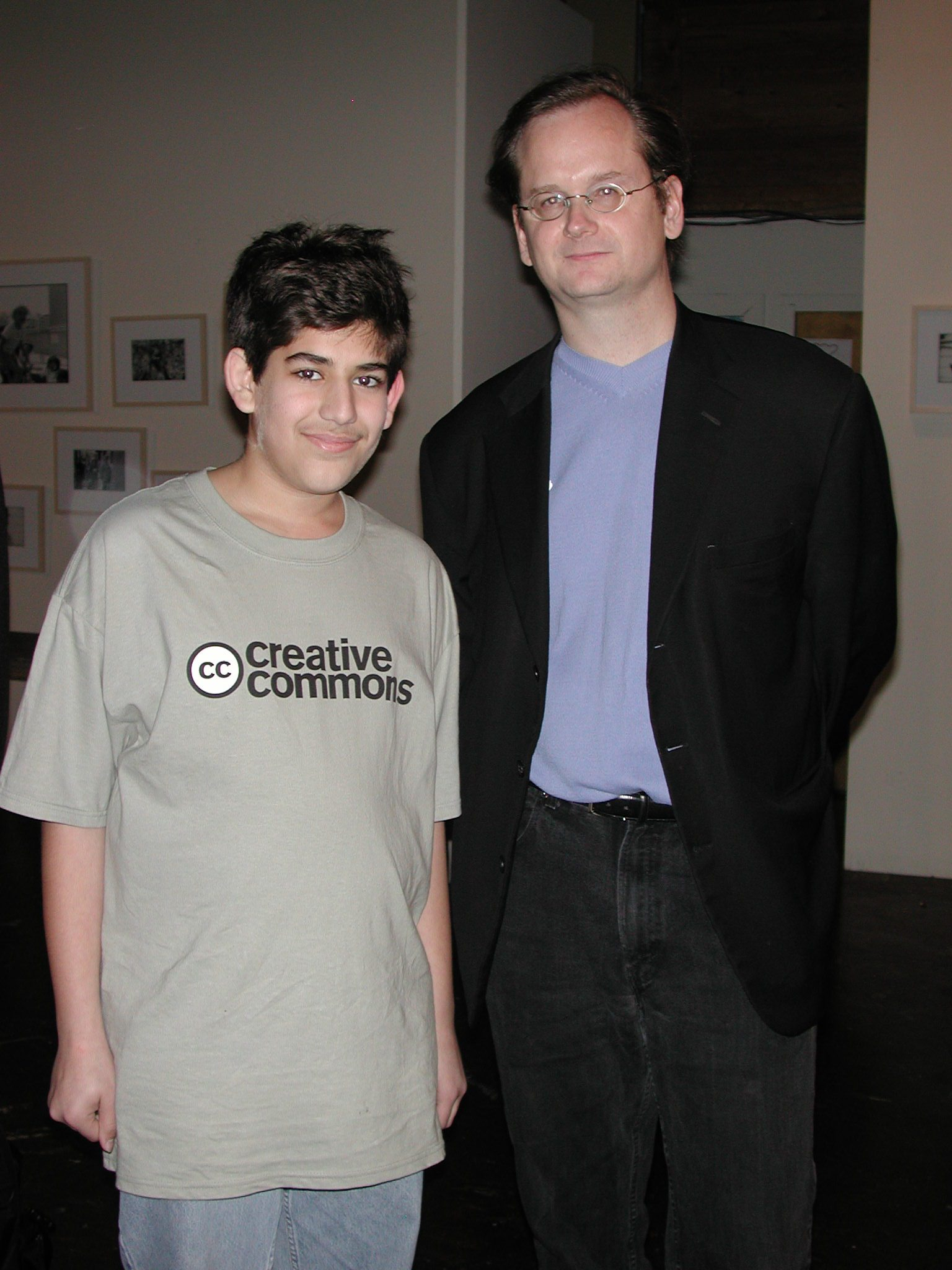
Aaron Swartz and Lessig in 2002 at the launch party for Creative Commons

On March 28, 2004, Lessig was elected to the Free Software Foundation (FSF) board of directors. He proposed the concept of "free culture". Lessig is also a well-known critic of copyright term extensions, and supports free and open-source software and open spectrum. At his free culture keynote speech at the O'Reilly Open Source Convention 2002, a few minutes of his speech was about software patents, which he views as a rising threat to free software, open source software, and innovation. In March 2006, Lessig joined the board of advisors of the Digital Universe project. A few months later, Lessig gave a talk on the ethics of the Free Culture Movement at the 2006 Wikimania conference. In December 2006, his lecture "On Free, and the Differences between Culture and Code" was one of the highlights at the Chaos Communication Congress with the motto "Who can you trust?"

According to Comedy Central, Lessig claimed in 2009 that because 70 percent of young people obtain digital information from illegal sources, laws should be changed. In a foreword to the Freesouls book project, Lessig makes an argument in favor of amateur artists in the world of digital technologies, stating that "there is a different class of amateur creators that digital technologies have ... enabled, and a different kind of creativity has emerged as a consequence."

=== Net neutrality ===
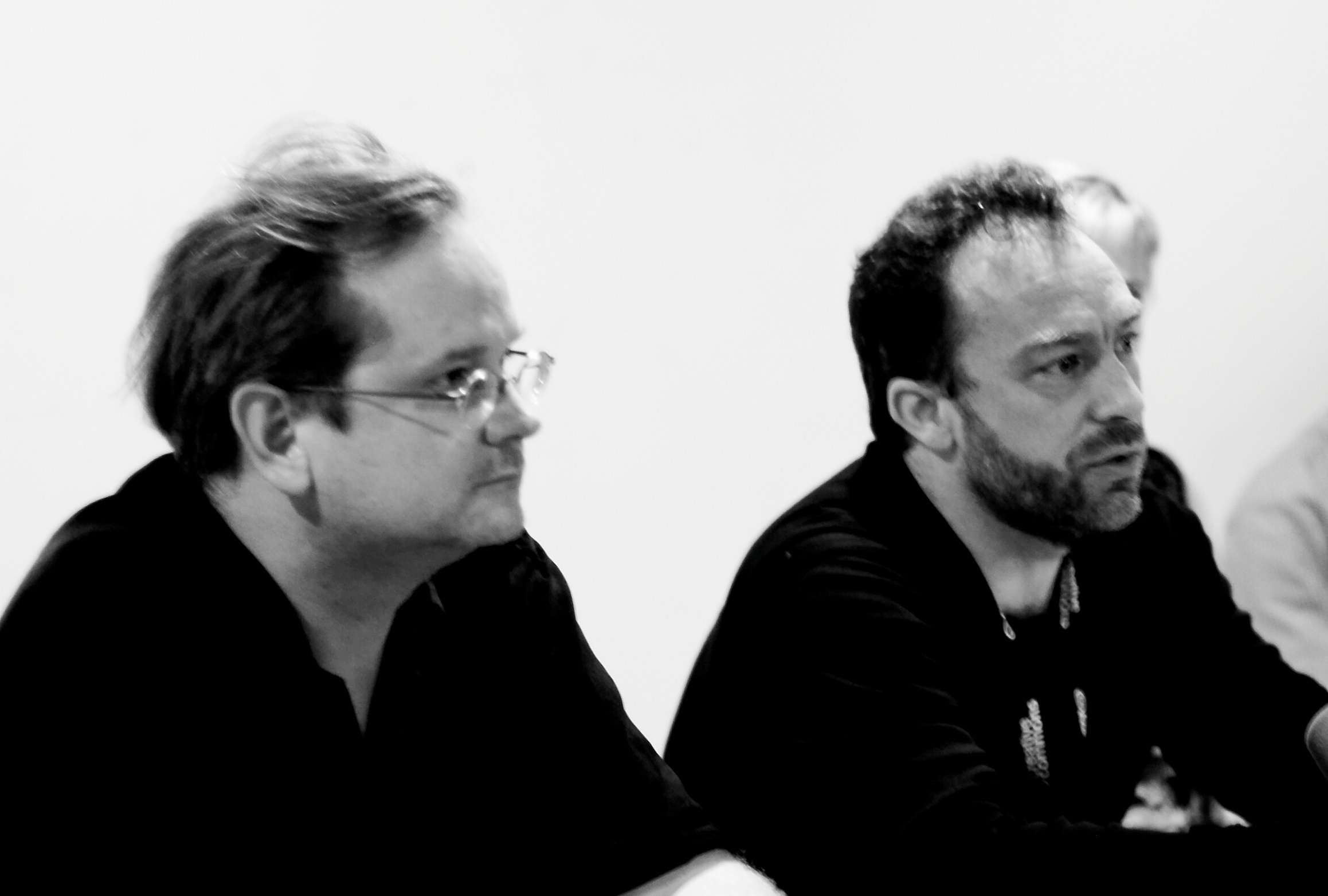
Lessig and Jimmy Wales at the iCommons iSummit07 in Dubrovnik

Lessig has long been known to be a supporter of net neutrality. In 2006, he testified before the U.S. Senate that he believed Congress should ratify Michael Powell's four Internet freedoms and add a restriction to access-tiering, i.e., he does not believe content providers should be charged different amounts. The reason is that the Internet, under the neutral end-to-end design is an invaluable platform for innovation, and the economic benefit of innovation would be threatened if large corporations could purchase faster service to the detriment of newer companies with less capital; however, Lessig has supported the idea of allowing ISPs to give consumers the option of different tiers of service at different prices. He was reported on CBC News as saying that he has always been in favour of allowing internet providers to charge differently for consumer access at different speeds. He said, "Now, no doubt, my position might be wrong. Some friends in the network neutrality movement as well as some scholars believe it is wrong—that it doesn't go far enough. But the suggestion that the position is 'recent' is baseless. If I'm wrong, I've always been wrong."

=== Legislative reform ===
Despite presenting an anti-regulatory standpoint in many fora, Lessig still sees the need for legislative enforcement of copyright. He has called for limiting copyright terms for creative professionals to five years, but believes that since many of them are independent, the work of creative professionals would become more easily and quickly available if a bureaucratic procedure were introduced to renew trademarks for up to 75 years after this five-year term.

Lessig has repeatedly taken a stance that privatization through legislation such as that seen in the 1980s in the UK with British Telecommunications is not the best way to help the Internet grow. He said, "When government disappears, it's not as if paradise will take its place. When governments are gone, other interests will take their place", before adding, "My claim is that we should focus on the values of liberty. If there is not government to insist on those values, then who?", and concluded, "The single unifying force should be that we govern ourselves."

=== Legal challenges ===
External videos
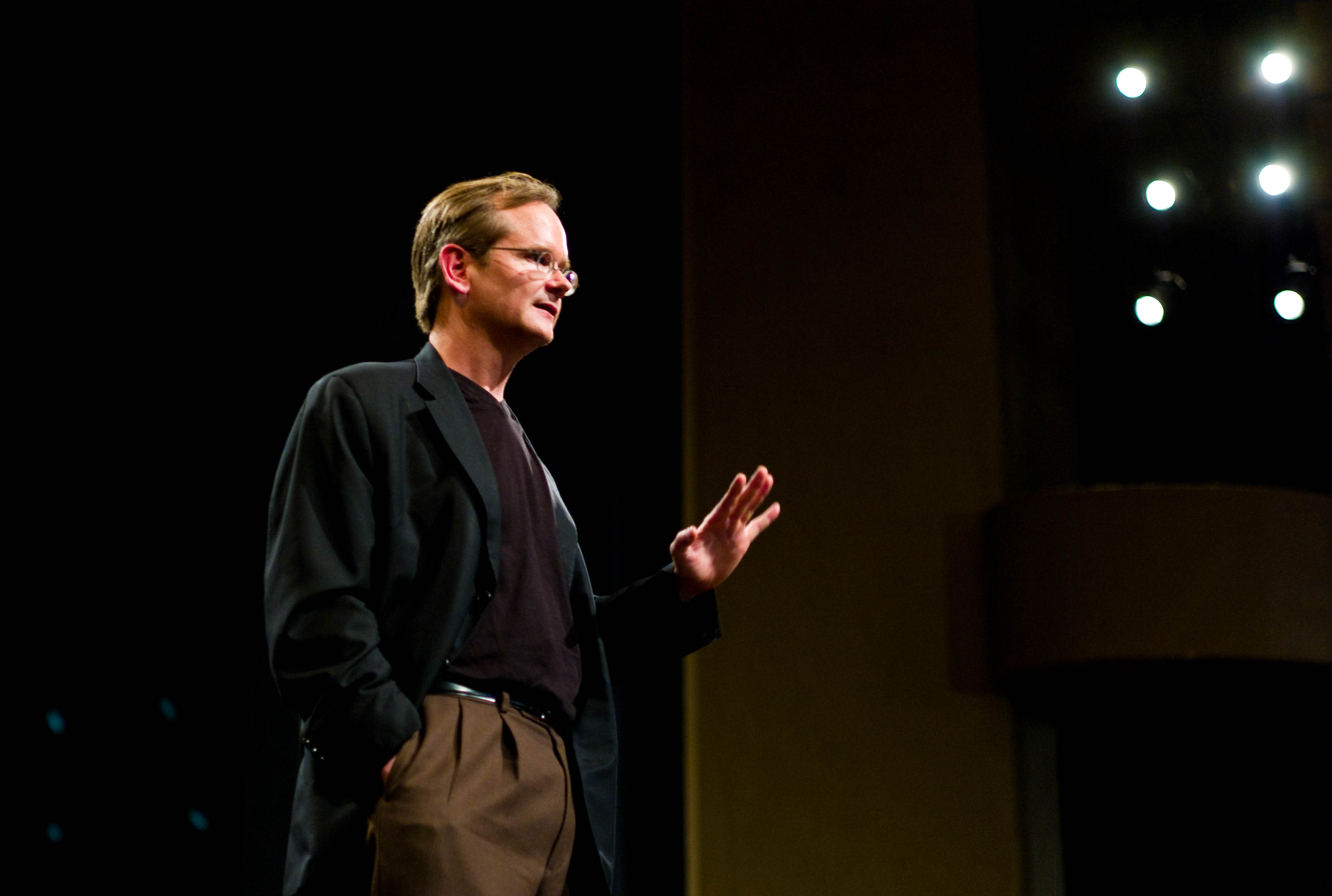
- Q&A: Lawrence Lessig (58:48), C-SPAN
- Larry Lessig: Laws that choke creativity (19:08), TED talks
- TEDxNYED – Lawrence Lessig (19:07), TEDx talks

From 1999 to 2002, Lessig represented a high-profile challenge to the Sonny Bono Copyright Term Extension Act. Working with the Berkman Center for Internet and Society, Lessig led the team representing the plaintiff in Eldred v. Ashcroft. The plaintiff in the case was joined by a group of publishers who frequently published work in the public domain and a large number of amici including the Free Software Foundation, the American Association of Law Libraries, the Bureau of National Affairs, and the College Art Association. In March 2003, Lessig acknowledged severe disappointment with his Supreme Court defeat in the Eldred copyright-extension case, where he unsuccessfully tried to convince Chief Justice William Rehnquist, who had sympathies for de-regulation, to back his "market-based" approach to intellectual property regulation.

In August 2013, Lawrence Lessig brought suit against Liberation Music PTY Ltd., after Liberation issued a takedown notice of one of Lessig's lectures on YouTube that had used the song "Lisztomania" by the band Phoenix, whom Liberation Music represents. Lessig sought damages under section 512(f) of the Digital Millennium Copyright Act, which holds parties liable for misrepresentations of infringement or removal of material. Lessig was represented by the Electronic Frontier Foundation and Jones Day. In February 2014, the case ended with a settlement in which Liberation Music admitted wrongdoing in issuing the takedown notice, issued an apology, and paid a confidential sum in compensation.

=== Killswitch ===
In October 2014, Killswitch, a film featuring Lawrence Lessig, as well as Aaron Swartz, Tim Wu, and Edward Snowden received its World Premiere at the Woodstock Film Festival, where it won the award for Best Editing. In the film, Lessig frames the story of two young hacktivists, Swartz and Snowden, who symbolize the disruptive and dynamic nature of the Internet. The film reveals the emotional bond between Lessig and Swartz, and how it was Swartz (the mentee) who challenged Lessig (the mentor) to engage in the political activism that has led to Lessig's crusade for campaign finance reform. In February 2015, Killswitch was invited to be screened at the Capitol Visitor Center in Washington, D.C., by Congressman Alan Grayson. The event was held on the eve of the Federal Communications Commission's historic decision on Net Neutrality. Lessig, Congressman Grayson, and Free Press CEO Craig Aaron spoke about the importance of protecting net neutrality and the free and open Internet.

Congressman Grayson states that Killswitch is "One of the most honest accounts of the battle to control the Internet -- and access to information itself." Richard von Busack of the Metro Silicon Valley, writes of Killswitch, "Some of the most lapidary use of found footage this side of The Atomic Café". Fred Swegles of the Orange County Register, remarks, "Anyone who values unfettered access to online information is apt to be captivated by Killswitch, a gripping and fast-paced documentary." Kathy Gill of GeekWire asserts that "Killswitch is much more than a dry recitation of technical history. Director Ali Akbarzadeh, producer Jeff Horn, and writer Chris Dollar created a human centered story. A large part of that connection comes from Lessig and his relationship with Swartz."

=== The Electors Trust ===
In December 2016, Lawrence Lessig and Laurence Tribe established The Electors Trust under the aegis of EqualCitizens.US to provide pro bono legal counsel, as well as a secure communications platform for those of the 538 members of the United States Electoral College regarding a vote of conscience against Donald Trump in the 2016 election. Lessig hosts the podcast Another Way in conjunction with The Young Turks Network.

=== Artificial intelligence ===
Lessig came out in favor of a "right to warn" proposed by former OpenAI employees that would protect their right to warn the public of the catastrophic risks of AI. Lessig also agreed to work pro bono in defense of the whistleblowers. In August 2024, Lessig co-authored a letter alongside AI researchers Yoshua Bengio, Geoffrey Hinton, and Stuart Russell in favor of SB 1047, a California AI safety bill that would require companies training the most powerful models to perform risk assessments on their models before release. The letter argued that the bill would be a first step towards mitigating the severe risks posed by AI, and "the bare minimum for effective regulation of this technology". Lessig said that Gavin Newsom, the Governor of California, would have the opportunity to "cement California as a national first-mover in regulating AI".

== Money-in-politics activism ==
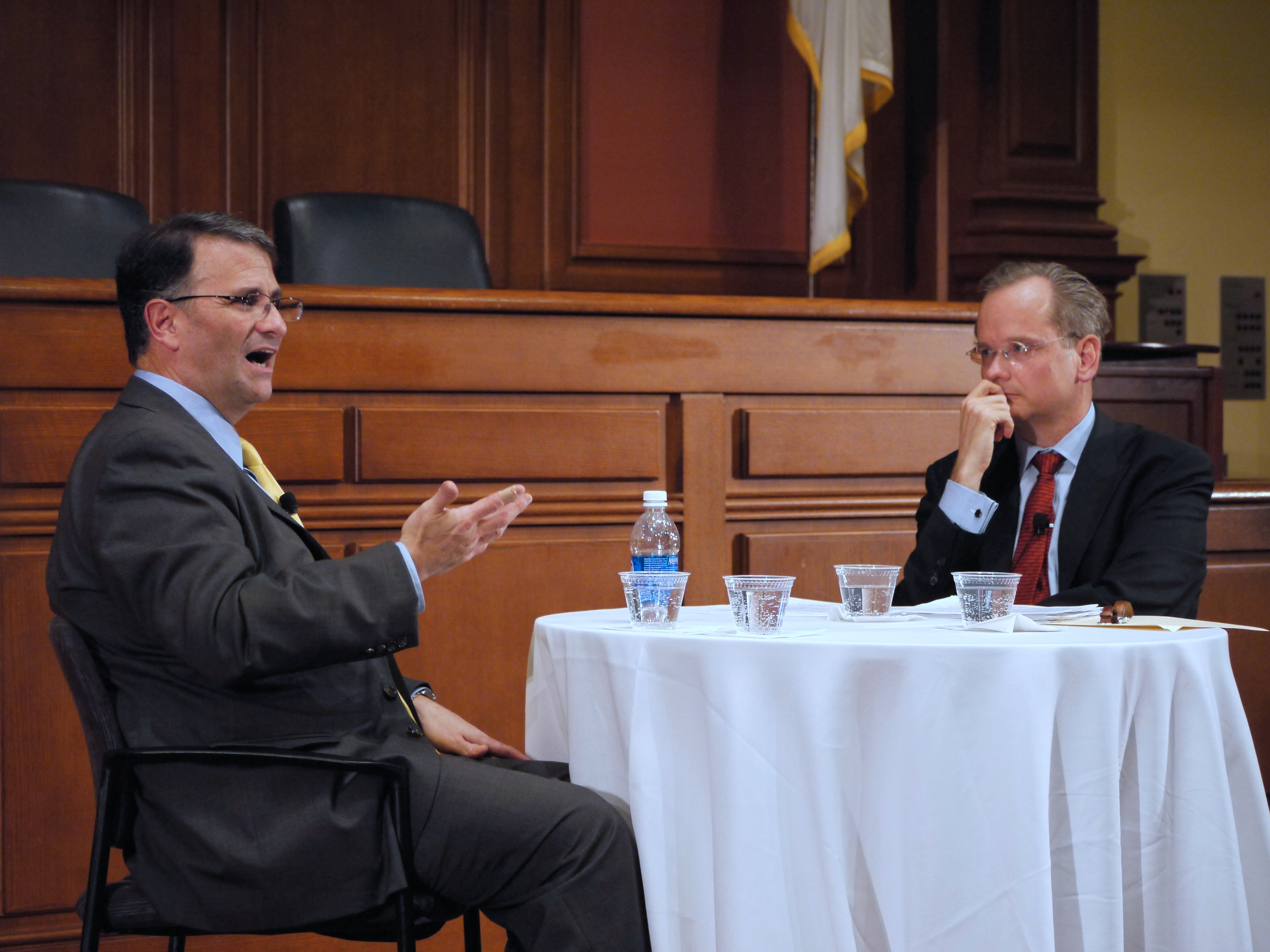
Former lobbyist Jack Abramoff having a discussion with Lessig

At the iCommons iSummit 07, Lessig announced that he would stop focusing his attention on copyright and related matters in order to work on political corruption instead, as the result of a transformative conversation with Aaron Swartz, a young internet prodigy whom Lessig met through his work with Creative Commons. This new work was partially facilitated through his wiki, Lessig Wiki, through which he has encouraged the public to document cases of corruption. Lessig criticized the revolving-door phenomenon in which legislators and staffers leave office to become lobbyists and after having become beholden to special interests.

In February 2008, a Facebook group formed by law professor John Palfrey encouraged Lessig to run for Congress from California's 12th congressional district, the seat vacated by the death of Representative Tom Lantos. Later that month, after forming an "exploratory project", he decided not to run for the vacant seat.

=== Rootstrikers ===
Despite having decided to forgo running for Congress, Lessig remained interested in attempting to change Congress to reduce corruption. To this end, he worked with political consultant Joe Trippi to launch a web based project called "Change Congress". In a press conference on March 20, 2008, Lessig explained that he hoped the Change Congress website would help provide technological tools voters could use to hold their representatives accountable and reduce the influence of money on politics. He is a board member of MAPLight.org, a nonprofit research group illuminating the connection between money and politics.

Change Congress later became Fix Congress First, and was finally named Rootstrikers. In November 2011, Lessig announced that Rootstrikers would join forces with Dylan Ratigan's Get Money Out campaign, under the umbrella of the United Republic organization. Rootstrikers subsequently came under the aegis of Demand Progress, an organization co-founded by Aaron Swartz.

=== Article V convention ===
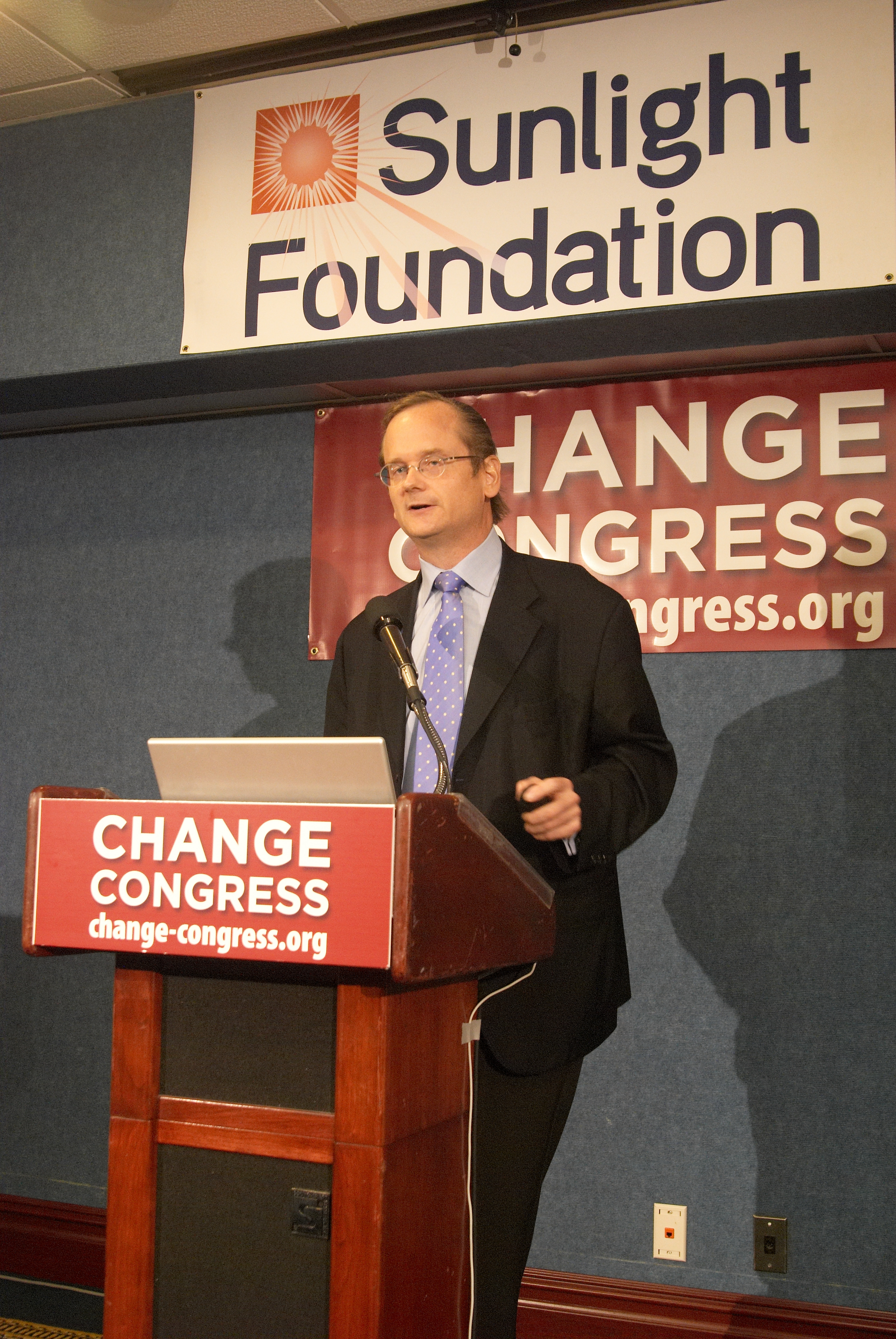
Lessig speaking before Change Congress and the Sunlight Foundation

In 2010, Lessig began to organize for a national Article V convention. He co-founded Fix Congress First! with Joe Trippi. In a speech in 2011, Lessig revealed that he was disappointed with Barack Obama's performance in office, criticizing it as a "betrayal", and he criticized the president for using "the (Hillary) Clinton playbook". Lessig has called for state governments to call for a national Article V convention, including by supporting Wolf-PAC, a national organization attempting to call an Article V convention to address the problem.

The convention Lessig supports would be populated by a "random proportional selection of citizens" which he suggested would work effectively. He said "politics is a rare sport where the amateur is better than the professional". He promoted this idea at a September 24–25, 2011, conference he co-chaired with the Tea Party Patriots' national coordinator, in Lessig's October 5, 2011, book, Republic, Lost: How Money Corrupts Congress—and a Plan to Stop It, and at the Occupy protest in Washington, D.C. Reporter Dan Froomkin said the book offers a manifesto for the Occupy Wall Street protestors, focusing on the core problem of corruption in both political parties and their elections. An Article V convention does not dictate a solution, but Lessig would support a constitutional amendment that would allow legislatures to limit political contributions from non-citizens, including corporations, anonymous organizations, and foreign nationals and he also supports public campaign financing and electoral college reform to establish the one person, one vote principle.

=== New Hampshire Rebellion ===
The New Hampshire Rebellion is a walk to raise awareness about corruption in politics. The event began in 2014 with a 185-mile march in New Hampshire. In its second year the walk expanded to include other locations in New Hampshire. From January 11 to January 24, 2014, Lessig and many others, such as New York activist Jeff Kurzon, marched from Dixville Notch, New Hampshire to Nashua (a 185-mile march) to promote the idea of tackling "the systemic corruption in Washington". Lessig chose this language over the related term "campaign finance reform", commenting in an interview with the Carnegie Council that the term "sounds like an alcoholic as someone who has a liquid intake problem." The walk was to continue the work of New Hampshire native Doris "Granny D" Haddock, and in honor of deceased activist Aaron Swartz. The New Hampshire Rebellion marched 16 miles from Hampton to New Castle on the New Hampshire Seacoast. The initial location also was chosen because of its important and visible role in the quadrennial "New Hampshire primaries", the traditional first primary of the presidential election.

== 2016 presidential candidacy ==
Lessig announced the launch of his long shot presidential campaign on September 6, 2015. On August 11, 2015, Lessig announced that he had launched an exploratory campaign for the purpose of exploring his prospects of winning the Democratic Party nomination for president of the United States in the 2016 election. Lessig pledged to seek the nomination if he raised one million dollars by Labor Day 2015. The announcement was widely reported in national media outlets, and was timed to coincide with a media blitz by the Lessig 2016 Campaign. Lessig was interviewed in The New York Times and Bloomberg. Campaign messages and Lessig's electoral finance reform positions were circulated widely on social media.

His campaign was focused on a single issue: The Citizen Equality Act, a proposal that couples campaign finance reform with other laws aimed at curbing gerrymandering and ensuring voting access. As an expression of his commitment to the proposal, Lessig initially promised to resign once the Citizen Equality Act became law and turn the presidency over to his vice president, who would then serve out the remainder of the term as a typical American president and act on a variety of issues. In October 2015, Lessig abandoned his automatic resignation plan and adopted a full policy platform for the presidency, although he did retain the passage of the Citizen Equality Act as his primary legislative objective. Lessig made a single campaign stop in Iowa, with an eye toward the first-in-the-nation precinct caucuses: at Dordt College, in Sioux Center, in late October. He announced the end of his campaign on November 2, 2015.

== Electoral College reform ==
In 2017, Lessig announced a movement by Equal Citizens to challenge the winner-take-all Electoral College vote allocation in the various states, called Equal Votes. Lessig was also a counsel for electors in the Supreme Court case Chiafalo v. Washington where the court decided states could force electors to follow the popular vote for their state.

== Awards and honors ==
In 2002, Lessig received the Award for the Advancement of Free Software from the Free Software Foundation (FSF). He also received the Scientific American 50 Award for having "argued against interpretations of copyright that could stifle innovation and discourse online." In 2006, Lessig was elected to the American Academy of Arts and Sciences.

In 2011, Lessig was named to the Fastcase 50, "honoring the law's smartest, most courageous innovators, techies, visionaries, and leaders". Lessig was awarded honorary doctorates by the Faculty of Social Sciences at Lund University, Sweden in 2013 and by the Université catholique de Louvain in 2014. Lessig received the 2014 Webby Lifetime Achievement award for co-founding Creative Commons and defending net neutrality and the free and open software movement.

== Personal life ==
In May 2005, it was revealed that Lessig had experienced sexual abuse by the director at the American Boychoir School, which he had attended as an adolescent. Lessig reached a settlement with the school in the past, under confidential terms. He revealed his experiences in the course of representing another student victim, John Hardwicke, in court. In August 2006, he succeeded in persuading the New Jersey Supreme Court to radically restrict the scope of immunity, which had protected nonprofits that failed to prevent sexual abuse from legal liability.

Lessig is married to Bettina Neuefeind, a German-born Harvard University colleague. The two married in 1999. He and Neuefeind have three children: Willem, Coffy, and Tess.

=== Defamation lawsuit against The New York Times ===
In 2019, during the criminal investigation of Jeffrey Epstein, it was discovered that the MIT Media Lab under former director Joichi Ito had accepted secret donations from Epstein after Epstein had been convicted on criminal charges. Ito eventually resigned as director of the MIT Media Lab following this discovery. After making supportive comments to Ito, Lessig wrote a Medium post in September 2019 to explain his stance. In his post, Lessig acknowledged that universities should not take donations from convicted criminals such as Epstein who had become wealthy through actions unrelated to their criminal convictions; however, if such donations were to be accepted, it was better to take them secretly rather than publicly connect the university to the criminal.

Lessig's essay drew criticism, and about a week later Nellie Bowles of The New York Times had an interview with Lessig in which he reiterated his stance related to such donations broadly. The article used the headline "A Harvard Professor Doubles Down: If You Take Epstein's Money, Do It in Secret", which Lessig confirmed was based on a statement he had made to the Times. Lessig took issue with the headline overlooking his argument that MIT should not accept such donations in the first place and also criticized the first two lines of the article which read, "It is hard to defend soliciting donations from the convicted sex offender Jeffrey Epstein. But Lawrence Lessig, a Harvard Law professor, has been trying." He subsequently accused the Times of writing clickbait with the headline crafted to defame him, and stated that the circulation of the article on social media had hurt his reputation.

In January 2020, Lessig filed a defamation lawsuit against the Times, including writer Bowles, business editor Ellen Pollock, and executive editor Dean Baquet. The Times stated they would "vigorously" defend against Lessig's claim, and believed that what they had published was accurate and had been reviewed by senior editors following Lessig's initial complaints. In April 2020, the Times changed its original headline to read "What Are the Ethics of Taking Tainted Funds? A conversation with Lawrence Lessig about Jeffrey Epstein, M.I.T. and reputation laundering". Lessig reported he subsequently withdrew his defamation lawsuit.

== Notable cases ==
- Golan v. Gonzales (representing multiple plaintiffs)
- Eldred v. Ashcroft (representing plaintiff Eric Eldred): Lost
- Kahle v. Gonzales (also see Brewster Kahle): Dismissed
- United States v. Microsoft (special master and author of an amicus brief addressing the Sherman Act)
  - Lessig was appointed special master by Judge Thomas Penfield Jackson in 1997; the appointment was vacated by the United States Court of Appeals for the District of Columbia Circuit; the appellate court ruled that the powers granted to Lessig exceeded the scope of the federal statute providing for special masters; Judge Jackson then solicited Lessig's amicus brief
  - Lessig said about this appointment: "Did Justice Jackson pick me to be his special master because he had determined I was the perfect mix of Holmes, and Ed Felten? No, I was picked because I was a Harvard Law Professor teaching the law of cyberspace. Remember: So is 'fame' made."
- MPAA v. 2600 (submitted an amicus brief with Yochai Benkler in support of 2600)
- McCutcheon v. FEC (submitted an amicus brief in support of FEC)
- Chiafalo v. Washington (representing Chiafalo)

== Selected works ==
=== Books ===
- Code and Other Laws of Cyberspace (Basic Books, 1999), ISBN 978-0-465-03913-5
- The Future of Ideas (Vintage Books, 2001), ISBN 978-0-375-50578-2
- Free Culture (Penguin, 2004), ISBN 978-1-59420-006-9
- Code: Version 2.0 (Basic Books, 2006), ISBN 978-0-465-03914-2
- Remix: Making Art and Commerce Thrive in the Hybrid Economy (Penguin, 2008), ISBN 978-1-59420-172-1
- Republic, Lost: How Money Corrupts Congress—and a Plan to Stop It (Twelve, 2011), ISBN 978-0-446-57643-7
- One Way Forward: The Outsider's Guide to Fixing the Republic (Kindle Single/Amazon, 2012)
- Lesterland: The Corruption of Congress and How to End It (2013, CC BY-NC), ISBN 978-1-937382-34-6
- Republic, Lost: The Corruption of Equality and the Steps to End It (Twelve, rev. ed., 2015), ISBN 978-1-4555-3701-3
- America, Compromised (University of Chicago Press, 2018), ISBN 978-0-226-31653-6
- Fidelity & Constraint: How the Supreme Court Has Read the American Constitution (Oxford University Press, 2019), ISBN 9780190945664
- They Don't Represent Us: Reclaiming Our Democracy (Dey Street/William Morrow, 2019), ISBN 978-0062945716
- How to Steal a Presidential Election (Yale University Press, 2024), ISBN 978-0300270792

=== Articles ===
- Lawrence, Lessig (1993). "Fidelity in Translation". Texas Law Review. 71 (6): 1165–1268.
- —; Sunstein, Cass R. (1994). "The President and the Administration". Columbia Law Review. 94 (1): 1–123. JSTOR 1123119.
- — (1995). "Understanding Changed Readings: Fidelity and Theory". Stanford Law Review. 47 (3): 395–472. JSTOR 1229086.
- — (1995). "The Regulation of Social Meaning". University of Chicago Law Review. 62 (3): 943–1046. JSTOR 1600054.
- — (1995). "The Path of Cyberlaw". Yale Law Journal. 104 (7): 1743–56.
- — (1995). "Translating Federalism: United States v. Lopez". Supreme Court Review. 1995: 125–216. JSTOR 3109612.
- — (1996). "The Zones of Cyberspace". Stanford Law Review. 48 (5): 1403–12. JSTOR 1229391.
- — (1998). "The New Chicago School". Journal of Legal Studies. 27 (2): 661–92. JSTOR 468039.
- — (1999). "The Law of the Horse: What Cyber Law Might Teach". Harvard Law Review. 113 (2): 501–49. JSTOR 1342331.
- —; Lemley, Mark A. (2001). "The End of End-to-End: Preserving the Architecture of the Internet in the Broadband Era". UCLA Law Review. 48 (4): 925–72.
- — (2001). "Copyright's First Amendment". UCLA Law Review. 48 (5): 1057–74.

== Filmography ==
- RiP!: A Remix Manifesto, a 2008 documentary film
- The Internet's Own Boy: The Story of Aaron Swartz, 2014 documentary film
- Killswitch, 2015 documentary film
- Meeting Snowden, a 2017 documentary film in which Lessig goes to Moscow to meet Edward Snowden
- The Swamp, 2020 documentary film
- Kim Dotcom: The Most Wanted Man Online, 2021 documentary film
- Additionally, Lessig himself was portrayed by Christopher Lloyd in season 6 of political drama The West Wing in the episode "The Wake Up Call" (2005).

== See also ==
- Copyleft
- Free content
- Free software movement
- FreeCulture.org
- Law of the Horse
- List of law clerks for the ninth seat of the Supreme Court of the United States
- Lobbying in the United States
- Open content
- Open educational resources
- Second Constitutional Convention of the United States proposal for constitutional reform

Academic offices
Preceded by Dennis F. Thompson	Director of the Edmond J. Safra Center for Ethics at Harvard University; 2009–2015	Succeeded by Danielle Allen
