= The Problem of the Media =

2004 book by Robert W. McChesney

The Problem of the Media: U.S. Communication Politics in the Twenty-First Century
- Author: Robert W. McChesney
- Language: English
- Published: 2004
- Publisher: Monthly Review Press
- Publication place: US
- Website: JSTOR j.ctt9qffts

The Problem of the Media: U.S. Communication Politics in the 21st Century is a book by Robert W. McChesney first published in 2004 by Monthly Review Press. The book discusses issues within journalism (e.g. biased news, declining quality of content, etc.), as well as weaknesses in the media sector, and new ways to regulate such.

== Analysis ==
In further analysis of identifying the problem with media as it relates to politics is to understand that political science in academia is very much a sideline subject matter that does not carry the weight it perhaps should on American politics and elections. The higher education discipline that does deal more with the impact of media bias on politics is communications. Research by Graber and Smith (2005) shows the importance and small change to begin to better understand the impact of the media and politics.

McChesney references multiple future directions and 10 targets to give political communication scholars better insight into the neglected aspect of the impact and issues facing politics and media in the 21st century. These targets include:

- Communications policy formulation;
- Preserving an open marketplace of ideas;
- Global cultural differences;
- Media as agents of political socialization;
- Public information campaigns;
- The rhetoric of political leaders;
- The rhetoric of negotiations;
- Learning limitations; and
- Network analyses.

Shirky (2011) first describes the 2001 impeachment trial of Philippine President Joseph Estrada. How mass text messages created crowds of protesters coordinated by text messages that shut down the city of Manila and the response changing the course of the hearing. Shirky continues:

Disciplined and coordinated groups, whether businesses or governments, have always had an advantage over undisciplined ones: they have an easier time engaging in collective action because they have way of directing the action of their members. Social media can compensate for the disadvantages of undisciplined groups by reducing the costs of coordination.

This has effectively changed the ability of smaller group impact on any politically charged environment. Shirky goes on to analyze several attempts by U.S. officials to control, censor or entertain controlling these private environments. In addition, Shirky believes that:

Washington's ability to shape or target these changes is limited. Instead, Washington should adopt a more general approach, promoting freedom of speech, freedom of the press, and freedom of assembly every where. And it should understand that progress will be slow. Only by switching from an instrumental to an environmental view of the effects of social media on the public sphere will the United States be able to take advantage of the long-term benefits these tools promise? Even though that may mean accepting short-term disappointment.

Internet is not always about doing everything,it sometimes mean using it wisely.Media bias, rating importance and monetary gain for sensationalizing political controversy verses fact reporting on politics is rampant in our society, the tools by which now normal people can piece together a political view and share it with thousands of people instantly is problematic where it is combined with the extreme mainstream media antics needs to be researched more thoroughly and is at a critical point that begs for reform and understanding not necessarily censorship.

== Book reviews ==
- Atkinson, Joshua. 2008. "The Problem of the Media." Mass Communication & Society 11(1):109–12. doi:10.1080/15205430701769358.
- Cumiskey, Kurt H. 2005. "The Problem of the Media." College & Research Libraries 66(3):284–86. doi:10.5860/crl.66.3.284.
- Herrick, D. F. 2004. "The Problem of the Media." Journalism & Mass Communication Quarterly 81(4):949–51. doi:10.1177/107769900408100413.
