= Change Congress =

Organization

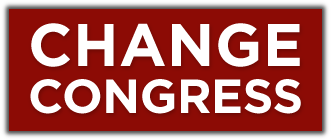
- Formation: 2008

Change Congress was a project aiming to end corruption in the United States Congress by reducing what it considered the distorted influence of money in that legislative body. Founded in 2008 by Lawrence Lessig and Joe Trippi, Change Congress aimed to organize citizens to support political candidates who do not take contributions from PACs and lobbyists, oppose earmarks, support public financing of campaigns, and support more transparency in Congress.

Change Congress later became Fix Congress First, and was finally named Rootstrikers. In November 2011, Lessig announced that Rootstrikers would join forces with Dylan Ratigan's Get Money Out campaign, under the umbrella of the United Republic organization. Rootstrikers subsequently became a project of Demand Progress.

== History ==
Change Congress was officially launched on March 20, 2008, at the National Press Club in Washington, D.C., during an event sponsored by the Sunlight Foundation.

Lessig weighed a bid for Congress against incumbent Jackie Speier, but decided against it, citing the importance of staying focused on the Change Congress movement.

Change Congress's main aim was to fight against "institutional corruption" within Congress by encouraging candidates to run on its platform and provide campaign contributions to those who do so. From January 2009 on, Change Congress was focusing its efforts on promoting citizen-funded elections, mainly through its Donor Strike campaign and support for the Fair Elections Now Act, and the three stage strategy had disappeared from its website.

== Tracking candidates ==
Change Congress hopes to use volunteers to create a comprehensive list of members of Congress and where they stand on issues of lobbyists, earmarks, public financing, and increased transparency in government.

As of January 9, 2009, the candidate tracking feature no longer existed on the Change Congress website.

== Political donations ==
Change Congress also hopes to change citizens' campaign contribution habits by giving people the option of only supporting candidates who pledge to honor some or all of Change Congress' pledge commitments.

As of January 9, 2009, the political donation feature has been removed from the Change Congress website due to the Donor Strike campaign.

== Donor strike ==
On January 8, 2009, Lessig appeared on The Colbert Report, and the following day Change Congress announced the Donor Strike.

The Donor Strike is an attempt to gain support amongst congressmen for citizen-funded congressional campaigns and in particular the Fair Elections Now Act. By signing up for the strike, supporters pledge "not to donate to any federal candidate unless they support legislation making congressional elections citizen-funded, not special-interest funded." The campaign hopes to strong-arm congressmen into supporting citizen-funded elections by withholding campaign donations.

As of May 28, 2009 Change Congress says it has motivated $1,563,920 in pledged campaign donation withholdings through the Donor Strike, although there is no real way to verify these numbers.
