= Citizen Equality Act of 2017 =

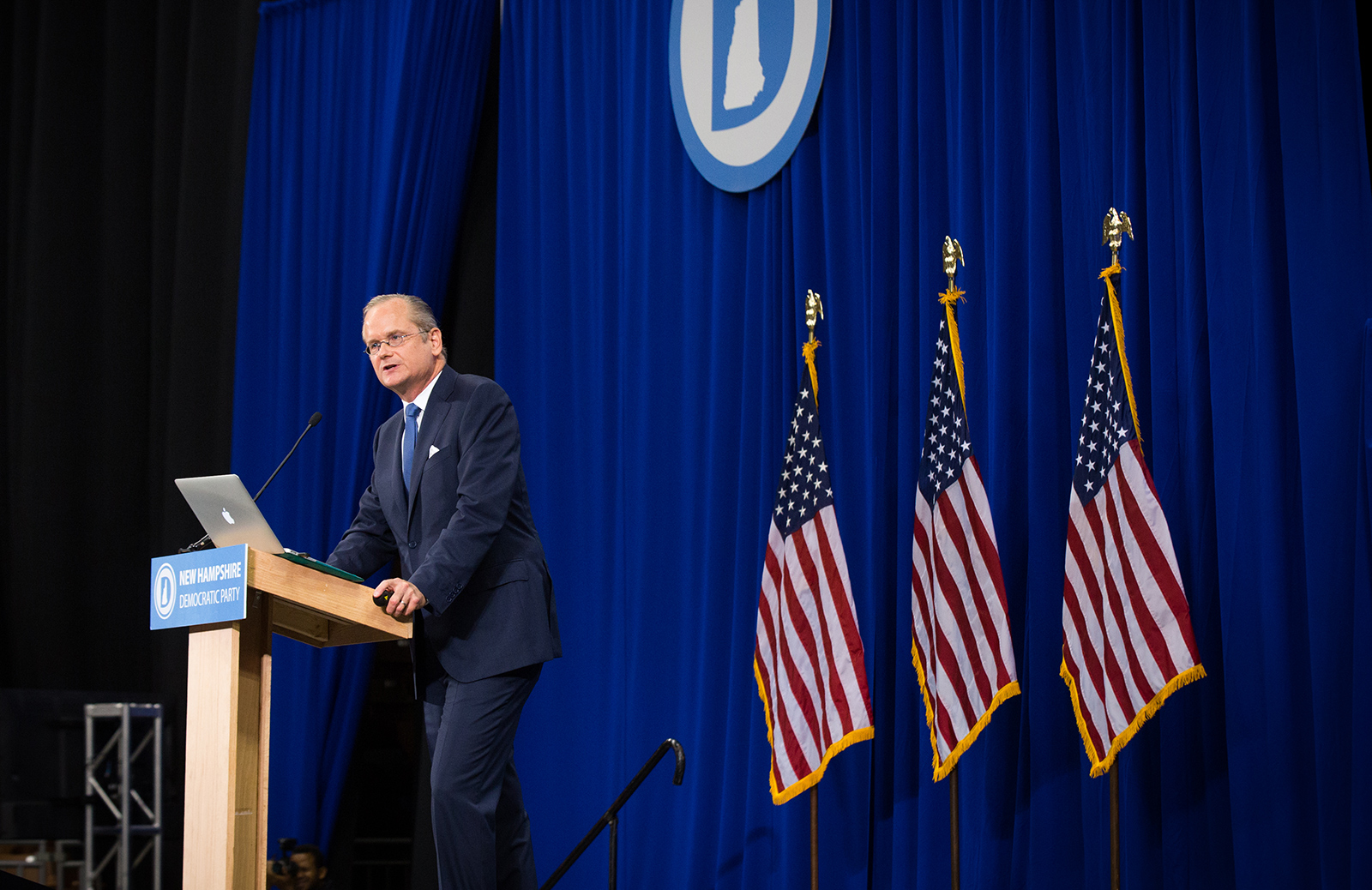
Lawrence Lessig speaking at a New Hampshire Democratic Party conference

The Citizen Equality Act of 2017 is a draft piece of legislation proposed by former 2016 American presidential candidate Lawrence Lessig. The act was the centerpiece of Lessig's campaign platform, encompassing his plans to improve political equality including campaign finance reform, expansion of voting access, and revised districting laws. Lessig had stated that if elected, he would make these reforms the first priority of his presidency. At the start of his campaign, he announced his candidacy as a "referendum," stating that he would step down upon the enactment of the Citizen Equality Act and turn the presidency over to the vice president. In an October 2015 interview on HBO's Real Time with Bill Maher, he retracted this statement and expressed his intention to stay on as president if elected. On November 2, 2015, Lessig ended his bid for the presidency, citing changes in Democratic Party rules that excluded him from the stage during televised debates.

== Rationale ==
Lessig cited the connection between moneyed interests and political campaigns as the greatest barrier to equal representation in American democracy.

In a 2013 TED talk, he presented statistics on the number of citizens responsible for raising the bulk of campaign funds: ".000042 percent — for those of you doing the numbers, you know that's 132 Americans — gave 60 percent of the Super PAC money spent in the cycle we have just seen ending ... it's .05 percent who are our relevant funders in America."

He argued that other policy goals could not be realized until campaign financing laws diminish the influence of super PACs and corporate entities over Congressional election results. "So I want you to take hold, to grab the issue you care the most about. Climate change is mine, but it might be financial reform or a simpler tax system or inequality ... We will never get your issue solved until we fix this issue first. So it's not that mine is the most important issue ... but mine is the first issue."

His campaign emphasized reducing the differential between the financial contributions of these entities and those of small donors through policy modifications: "this is a problem of just incentives, just incentives. Change the incentives, and the behavior changes, and the states that have adopted small dollar funded systems have seen overnight a change in the practice."

As recently as 2011, Lessig's activism had centered on exploring the possibility of a Second Constitutional Convention, culminating in a Conference on the Constitutional Convention held at Harvard Law School in September of that year. His 2011 book Republic, Lost: How Money Corrupts Congress—and a Plan to Stop It also investigates a second Convention as a solution to the influence of business interests on legislature. Lessig and legal scholar Sanford Levinson, best known for his book calling for a Second Constitutional Convention, gave a joint podcast with the National Constitution Center in 2014 to discuss the advantages of and challenges to changing the Constitution. However, since the beginning of his presidential campaign, Lessig had adjusted his focus to reforms within the existing legal system - namely, his draft legislation.

== Content ==
=== Right to Vote ===
The proposal would authorize "at minimum" two existing bills: the Voting Rights Advancement Act of 2015, introduced in June 2015 by senator Patrick Leahy of Vermont, and the Voter Empowerment Act of 2015, introduced in March 2015 by representative John Lewis of Georgia's 5th congressional district.

==== Voting Rights Advancement Act of 2015 ====
This set of amendments to the Voting Rights Act of 1965 includes an expansion of its criteria for coverage across states. It contains provisions for increased access to polling places and voter registration agencies for underserved and tribal regions, as well as for absentee ballots and early voting on designated Indian lands. It also either adds seats elected at-large or redraws political subdivisions in which racial or language minority groups comprise significant parts of the population, or in which these groups have increased in numbers. The bill enacts more stringent regulation and pre-clearance for changes to districts in such subdivisions, and requires greater transparency with respect to changes in documentation or qualifications to vote.

==== Voter Empowerment Act of 2015 ====
The latter would require states to administer online voting registration, provide opportunities for correcting clerical errors, and expand random audits of federal election results. It also would amend the criminal code to prohibit state officials from interfering with voter registration on the basis of unverified match lists, clerical errors irrelevant to eligibility, or voter caging lists. Additionally, it would require the provision of alternate voting mechanisms for those with disabilities or difficulties with literacy. Furthermore, the proposal would institute automatic voter registration and a national holiday on Election Day.

=== Representation ===
==== Ranked-Choice Voting ====
The Act proposes, at minimum, the Ranked Choice Voting Act as a solution to gerrymandering and other representational issues caused by districting. The RCVA was developed by FairVote, a nonprofit organization advocating electoral reform. The proposed method would overturn the 1967 mandate for single-winner districts in favor of multi-winner districts, with members of Congress chosen by a ranked choice method. It would create multi-member districts in states with more than five representatives.

==== Redistricting ====
The RCVA also would mandate that redistricting be conducted by independent commissions. It contains eligibility provisions to ensure that members of the commissions do not have conflicts of interest that would impair the fairness of the districting process, including a written statement of impartiality and exclusion of those who have personal or family connections to public office or lobbying interests. The commissions would be selected to maximize geographic, ethnic, race, and gender diversity, as well as to include members with relevant "analytical skills." The RCVA imposes limits on the districting process itself, including that districts be equal in population, contiguous, and politically diverse as measured by past election data. Any attempt to change district boundaries would necessitate an "open and transparent process" involving public comment and the public release of data or software used in the redistricting process.

=== Citizen Funded Elections ===
The Act would combine the campaign funding proposals delineated by John Sarbanes' Government by the People Act and RepresentUs's American Anti-Corruption Act. It would institute matching funds for small contributions to congressional and federal elections, as well as limit opportunities in government service positions for those with interests in the private sector.

== Reception ==
Critics contested Lessig's assertion that campaign finance reform is the most decisive issue in progressive political reform. Thomas Mann, senior fellow at the Brookings Institution, responded to his platform that "our problems right now are that we have highly polarized parties and midterm elections that routinely produce gridlock. And it isn't money that's gridlocking the system — it's hyperpartisanship."

Others rejected his bid as an unrealistic campaign for a position requiring a broader understanding of American politics. Robinson Meyer of The Atlantic wrote, "What if he proposes his Citizens Equality Act but can't get it passed? And what if there's some foreign-policy crisis or economic crash in December 2016: Will President Lessig carefully put that aside while he focuses on enacting his precious bill?" Steven Rosenfeld of AlterNet named Lessig a "case study in the dangers of single-issue politics," maintaining that "... adopting nationwide publicly financed campaigns ... has been the agreed-upon solution among progressive reformers for decades."

The practical likelihood of Lessig's reform plan was also the subject of criticism. Writes Mann, "We don't have the luxury of using the election to try to build a mandate for a set of political reforms that would have no chance of passing in the face of GOP opposition and would be of only incremental utility if they did."

Lessig has come under fire for his statements expressing apparent support for Republican presidential candidate Donald Trump's positioning on corporate political influence. His quote in an interview that "Donald Trump is the biggest gift to the movement for reform since the Supreme Court gave us Citizens United" was reproduced in a Politico feature titled "Meet the Liberals Who Love Trump."
