= Law of the Horse =

Law of the Horse was a term used in the mid-1990s to define the state of cyberlaw during the nascent years of the Internet.

The term first gained prominence in a 1996 cyberlaw conference presentation by Judge Frank H. Easterbrook of the United States Court of Appeals for the Seventh Circuit. Easterbrook, who was also on the faculty of the University of Chicago, later published his presentation in the University of Chicago Legal Forum as "Cyberspace and the Law of the Horse", in which he argued against the notion of defining cyberlaw as a unique section of legal studies and litigation. Though Easterbrook credited Karl Llewellyn for coining the expression "law of the horse," Easterbrook's analysis was prompted by Gerhard Casper's arguments against specialized or niche legal studies. In effect, Easterbrook applied Casper's discussion of the law of the horse to cyberlaw:

...the best way to learn the law applicable to specialized endeavors is to study general rules. Lots of cases deal with sales of horses; others deal with people kicked by horses; still more deal with the licensing and racing of horses, or with the care veterinarians give to horses, or with prizes at horse shows. Any effort to collect these strands into a course on 'The Law of the Horse' is doomed to be shallow and to miss unifying principles.

Easterbrook's theory was challenged by Lawrence Lessig, a professor at Harvard Law School, in a 1999 article "The Law of the Horse: What Cyberlaw Might Teach." Lessig's article, which was first presented at the Boston University Law School Faculty Workshop, argued that legal perceptions and rules would need to evolve as the cyberspace environment developed and expanded.

== See also ==
- Declaration of the Independence of Cyberspace
