= Mayday PAC =

American crowd-funded non-partisan Super PAC

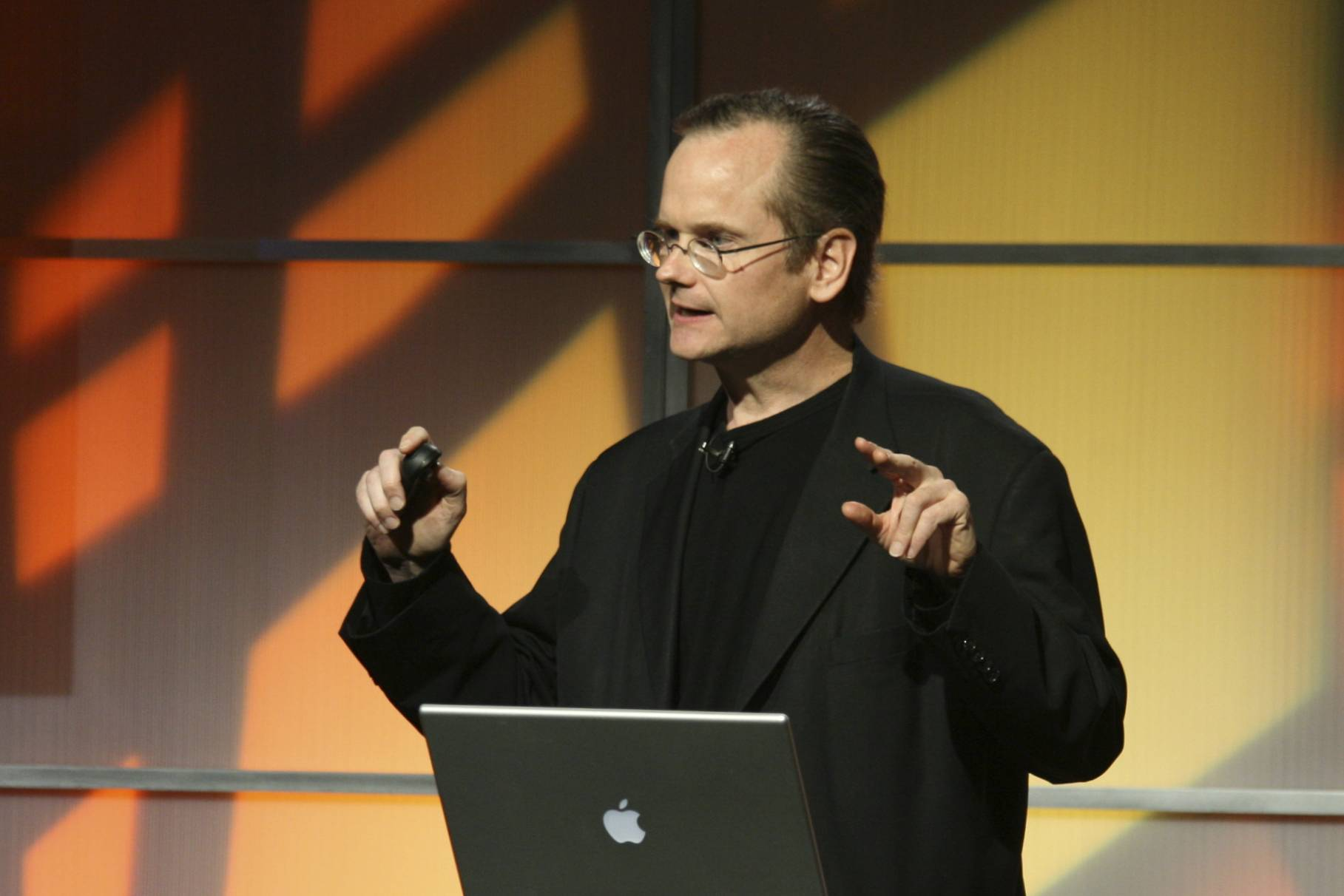
Lawrence Lessig in 2008

Mayday PAC is an American crowd-funded non-partisan Super PAC created by Harvard Law School professor and activist Lawrence Lessig. Its purpose is to help elect candidates to the Congress to pass campaign finance reform. It is notable for raising large sums from numerous contributors in a short span of time – nearly $11 million in 2014 – and was described in the Los Angeles Times as the "super PAC to end all super PACs." The group spent over $10 million in the November 2014 elections, but its strategic plan of electing candidates friendly to campaign finance reform failed.

In August 2015, shortly before announcing his candidacy for President of the United States, Lessig resigned from the PAC and was replaced by board member Zephyr Teachout. Teachout left the post in December 2015 when she announced she was running for Congress in New York State and was replaced by Cyrus Patten, longtime anti-corruption advocate and policy reformer.

Mayday PAC has since announced a new, local approach, citing "Across the country, citizens are passing reforms to their local campaign finance laws. This takes courage that is currently lacking in Congress."

== Original strategy ==
Mayday PAC's original strategy had four stages: (1) in 2014 testing intervention in Congressional races, (2) in 2016 electing a Congressional majority in favor of reform, (3) in 2017 winning election reform legislation, and (4) pressing for whatever Constitutional reform is necessary to secure the reform.

== Background ==
Lawrence Lessig has advocated electoral reform for many years, and conceived the idea of a crowdfunded Super PAC as a way to achieve such reform. Mayday PAC began in May 2014, but before officially launching the fund raising effort, Lessig led 200 people on a walk from Dixville Notch to Nashua in New Hampshire, stopping at coffee shops and small events to talk with people about money in politics, to generate media attention; further walks are planned. He explained, "Yes, we want to spend big money to end the influence of big money... Ironic, I get it. But embrace the irony."

The fund-raising plan was a variation on traditional crowd funding approaches in that specified fund-raising targets must be met by certain dates. Lessig explained that the immediate goal is to raise enough money to sway five elections to Congress. He said, "We've structured this as a series of matched-contingent goals. We've got to raise $1 million in 30 days; if we do, we'll get that $1 million matched. Then we've got to raise $5 million in 30 days; if we do, we'll get that $5 million matched as well. If both challenges are successful, then we'll have the money we need to compete in 5 races in 2014. Based on those results, we’ll launch a (much much) bigger effort in 2016—big enough to win."

On July 28, 2014, the PAC began a $12-million advertising campaign for the 2014 midterm elections. The plan was to spend the funds electing members of congress who are committed to getting money out of politics, regardless of their party affiliation. $4 million of this money was to be spent in Senate races in Iowa and New Hampshire.

== Targeted races in 2014 ==
The Mayday PAC spent significant money helping the campaign of each of these candidates in 2014. Each candidate was viewed by Mayday PAC as a supporter of campaign finance reform.

- Ruben Gallego (D, AZ), who won his primary race on August 26 and was elected in November 2014, becoming the only winning non-incumbent supported by Mayday PAC, which spent $149,999 in supporting him. He supports the Government by the People Act which favors establishing a system of elections in which candidates who choose to accept only small donations receive matching funds. Formerly elected in 2010, he served as assistant minority leader in the Arizona House of Representatives.
- Carol Shea-Porter (D, NH), an incumbent who lost her election, despite $299,999 spent by Mayday on her behalf. She was the first woman to be elected to a federal office from New Hampshire. She was a vocal opponent of the Supreme Court's Citizens United decision and supported the Consumer Protection Act. She voted for the CARD Act.
- Walter B. Jones Jr. (R, NC), who won his election, was an incumbent who received $99,999 in support from Mayday. He was the only Republican member of Congress to publicly support campaign finance reform and the only Republican co-sponsor of the Government by the People Act (matching funds for small donors) and the DISCLOSE Act, legislation to reveal the donors behind campaign advertisements. He is also a critic of the Citizens United Supreme Court decision.
- Jim Rubens (R, NH), who lost his bid to defeat Scott Brown in the New Hampshire Republican U.S. Senate primary, 24.5% to 49.9%. Mayday spent $1,512,261 in favor of Rubens, plus $128,747 against Brown, who went on to lose the general election to incumbent Jeanne Shaheen.
- Staci Appel (D, IA), who lost her election, despite $17,334 spent by Mayday in support of her, and $714,638 spent attacking her opposition, David Young. She was a former state senator who had pledged to support the Government By The People Act (public matching funds for small donors) and a constitutional amendment to overturn the Supreme Court's Citizens United ruling. As a state senator, Appel sponsored legislation (SSB 1173) that would have established public financing of elections in Iowa for the first time.
- Rick Weiland (D, SD), who lost his election, despite $875,390 in spending from Mayday and $290,522 spent against his opponent, governor Mike Rounds. Weiland was regional director of FEMA, director of the South Dakota AARP, and a previous candidate for South Dakota's at-large congressional district.
- Greg Orman (I, KS), who lost his election, despite $1,430,775 from Mayday spent attacking his opponent, incumbent Senator Pat Roberts.
- Paul Clements (D, MI), who lost his election, despite $403,573 from Mayday plus $1,684,501 from Mayday spent attacking his opponent, incumbent Fred Upton.

== Fundraising information ==
Goal	Amount needed	Date needed	Amount raised	Date raised	Match amount *	Sources
Raise money	$1 million	May 31, 2014	$1.1 million	May 13, 2014	$1 million (total)	Los Angeles Times, Politico, TechDirt
2014 Final Fundraising			$10,947,947 (final)	November 4, 2014		MAYDAY PAC,

- Match donors for $1 million: Reid Hoffman, Peter Thiel, Chris Anderson, Brad Burnham, David Milner, Fred Wilson, Joanne Wilson, Vin Ryan.

== See also ==
- Campaign finance reform in the United States
- Rootstrikers
- Wolf PAC
- Issue One
- Every Voice
