= How to Steal a Presidential Election =

2024 book by Lawrence Lessig

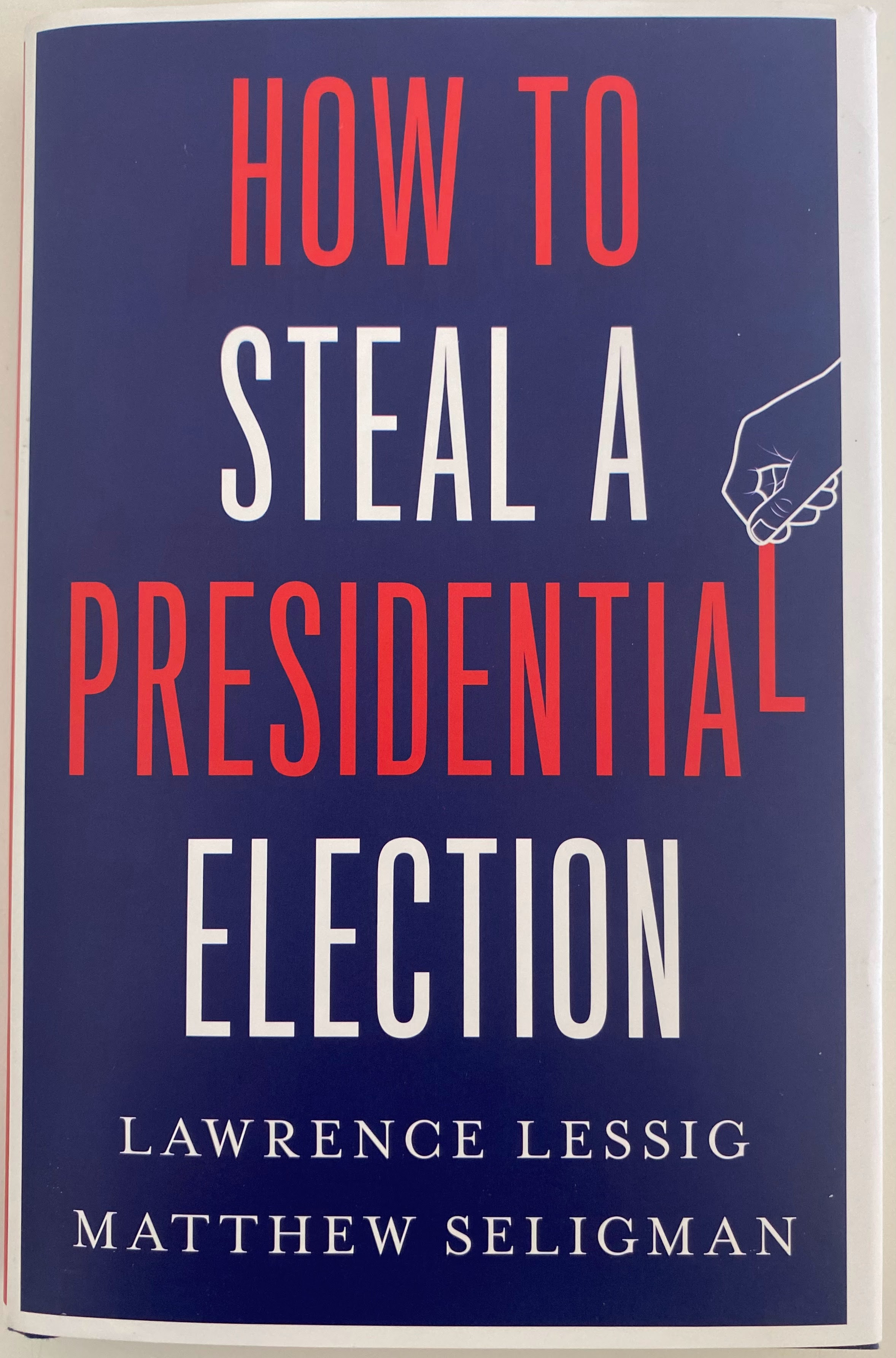
- Book cover
- Authors: Lawrence Lessig and Matthew Seligman
- Language: English
- Publisher: Yale University Press
- Publication date: February 13, 2024
- Publication place: New Haven, Connecticut
- Media type: Print (hardcover), e-book, audiobook
- Pages: 176
- ISBN: 978-0300270792

How to Steal a Presidential Election is a 2024 non-fiction book written by Lawrence Lessig and Matthew Seligman which examines the various legal frameworks that the loser of a presidential election in the United States could use to assume office in spite of the election results. Cataloging several courses of action a losing presidential election candidate or members of their party could take in the aftermath of a contested election, the book also examines critical failures in the Electoral Count Act of 1887 (ECA) and the Electoral Count Reform Act of 2022 (ECRA). The book was inspired by the events of the 2020 United States presidential election and the subsequent attack on the Capitol.

== Contents ==
Lessig and Seligman propose a realistic scenario for the 2024 election as the basis for their legal theories. In this scenario, Donald Trump has won the popular vote nationwide while Joe Biden has secured an Electoral College majority with 274 electoral votes. The election turns on the state of North Carolina where Biden has narrowly won the popular vote and thus the state's 16 electoral votes. The state's governor-elect is loyal to former president Trump and posits that the election in the state was marred by fraud.

Lessig and Seligman submit six viable legal theories for how a determined losing candidate and his loyalists could undermine the results of the election to assume power.

1. "Faithless" electors strategy – coercing electors to vote for the losing candidate. While the Supreme Court decided in Chiafalo v. Washington that a state could enforce an elector's pledge to vote for a specified candidate, not all states have laws requiring electors to do as such. Some states may bestow fines on electors who don't vote as they pledged but not all states have a mechanism for replacing them, allowing electors in some states to vote contrary to their pledge without meaningful repercussions.

2. Rogue governors strategy – a governor aligned with a losing candidate could certify and submit to Congress a slate of electors that is contrary to the popular vote. While Congress could vote to reject this slate, a vote would require the majorities of both the House of Representatives and the Senate. If one house refuses to reject the slate, then the slate is not rejected. Federal courts may intervene to reverse the governor's decision but the court's inability to sufficiently enforce its ruling would likely not mean a failure of the gambit.

3. Force majeure strategy – the ECRA creates an ability for states to extend voting in a presidential election in the event of "force majeure events that are extraordinary and catastrophic." However, Congress failed to define or provide a list of situations that meet these criteria. Furthermore, Congress did not require judicial review of any state-level determination of a force majeure. A state legislature aligned with a losing candidate could, in theory, declare a force majeure (more than likely citing voter fraud) as the winning candidate becomes clear, allowing time for more voters to cast their ballot for the losing candidate. Likewise, a state legislature could simply refrain from declaring force majeure in the event of a catastrophic occurrence if it believes that an extension of voting would not benefit their preferred candidate.

4. Who's the judge strategy – a state could feasibly declare that the state legislature, not an independent agency that administers elections, is the final certifying authority for election results. This would give the legislature the ability to accept or reject election results. A state legislature aligned with a losing candidate could wrongly determine that the loser of the popular vote actually won, likely by citing fraud, a tainted process, or other irregularities.

5. The nuclear option – a state legislature could simply cancel an election before Election Day and assign the state's electors to its preferred candidate. The Constitution does not require states to hold popular elections to select electors. A state legislature retains the ability to select electors without popular input.

6. The most dangerous strategy – a state legislature may direct electors to vote for a specified candidate regardless of the outcome of the state's popular vote. A state may replace electors who fail to vote as directed by the legislature. Thus, a legislature could simply rule that electors must vote for a candidate even if that candidate clearly did not win the election in the state and replace electors who fail to vote in that fashion. Lessig and Seligman argue that under precedent set by Chiafalo v. Washington and Colorado Department of State v. Baca this course of action is perfectly viable.

== Reception ==
Lloyd Green of The Guardian called it a "granular and disturbing examination of the vulnerabilities and pressure points in the way the US selects its president."

== See also ==
- Chiafalo v. Washington
- Samuel Miles
- Faithless electors
- Independent state legislature theory
