= Rootstrikers =

American activist organization

- Founded: April 2011
- Founder: Lawrence Lessig
- Type: Nonprofit organization
- Purpose: Reducing the corrosive influence of money in politics
- Region served: US (nationwide)

Rootstrikers is a nonpartisan grassroots activist organization run by Demand Progress and created by Harvard Law School professor Lawrence Lessig and political activist Joe Trippi (a Democratic campaign worker and consultant) for the purpose of fighting political corruption in the United States and reducing the role of special interest money in elections. According to Lessig, the idea is not to hack at the branches of the problem but rather focus on its root, which Lessig views as a corrupt campaign finance system, and hence he named the organization rootstrikers.

== History ==
Rootstrikers was founded in April 2011. In November 2011, Rootstrikers, previously known as Change Congress and Fix Congress First, became a project of United Republic, a non-partisan 501(c)(4) organization. In September 2012, Rootstrikers reorganized under the umbrella of Fund for the Republic, a 501(c)(3) organization dedicated to challenging the influence of money in American politics. As of July 2013, Rootstrikers became a project of Demand Progress, an organization cofounded by Aaron Swartz, an internet activist. The organization plans to use technology to help engage people.

The name "Rootstrikers" is based on a quote from the first chapter of Henry David Thoreau's book Walden: "There are a thousand hacking at the branches of evil to one who is striking at the root". In December 2011, Lawrence Lessig appeared on The Daily Show starring Jon Stewart and suggested that the public needs to strike at the root of money in politics; Stewart advised Lessig "You need a better term than rootstriker." Lessig credits the line quoted above from Henry David Thoreau's book Walden for inspiring the name.

== Positions ==
In his 2012 book One Way Forward, Lessig proposes what he termed the Anti-Corruption Pledge. Lessig launched the Pledge as a project of Rootstrikers on February 24, 2012, on MSNBC's show Morning Joe. The pledge is available for people to sign to show their support for the fight against corruption. The Pledge has four provisions:

- publicly funded elections
- political expenditures which are limited and transparent
- ending the revolving door between Congress and K Street
- reaffirmation that when the Declaration of Independence spoke of entities "endowed by their Creator with unalienable Rights," it was speaking of natural persons only, and not corporations.

== Activities ==
Over the weekend of October 29, 2011, a coalition of Rootstrikers and the conservative Tea Party Patriots held a "Conference on the Constitutional Convention" in hopes of generating support for the calling of a national convention to propose proposing amendments to the U.S. Constitution. Such a convention, also called an "Article V Convention", is one of two ways processes authorized by Article Five of the United States Constitution whereby the Constitution, the nation's frame of government, may be altered, and must be called by the United States Congress upon the request of two-thirds (presently 34) of the state legislatures. Amendments may also be proposed by Congress itself with a two-thirds vote in both the House of Representatives and the Senate. Thirty-three amendments to the U.S. Constitution have been approved by Congress and sent to the states for ratification. (Twenty-seven of them have been ratified and are now part of the Constitution.) As of 2016 the convention process has never been used for proposing constitutional amendments.

Rootstrikers is one of 15 organizations in the Money Out / Voters In coalition that sponsored "A 28th Amendment" conference at the UCLA School of Law, Saturday, November 17, 2012. Lawrence Lessig was the keynote speaker. The agenda included presentations by other experts, including Greg Colvin, who provided a dozen questions that he thought should be answered for any proposed amendment on this issue. The conference web site also includes a comparison chart of 21 alternative amendments, 18 that have already been introduced in the US congress plus language proposed by Free Speech for People, Greg Colvin, and Move to Amend. Of the proposed amendments, five were identified as primarily attempting to limit the constitutional rights of corporations; the other 16 were described as dealing more with campaign finance, though there is overlap. The conference ended with breakout sessions and a call to further action.

== See also ==
- Second Constitutional Convention of the United States
