= Republic, Lost =

2011 book by Lawrence Lessig

- Cover
- Author: Lawrence Lessig
- Publisher: Twelve
- Publication date: 2011
- Pages: 400
- ISBN: 978-0-446-57643-7
- OCLC: 707964996
- Preceded by: Remix

Republic, Lost: How Money Corrupts Congress—and a Plan to Stop It is the sixth book by Harvard law professor and free culture activist Lawrence Lessig. In a departure from the topics of his previous books, Republic, Lost outlines what Lessig considers to be the systemic corrupting influence of special-interest money on American politics, and only mentions copyright and other free culture topics briefly, as examples. He argued that the Congress in 2011 spent the first quarter debating debit-card fees while ignoring what he sees as more pressing issues, including health care reform or global warming or the deficit. Lessig has been described in The New York Times as an "original and dynamic legal scholar."

In October, 2015 a second edition of the book was published.

== Overview ==
The central argument of Republic, Lost is that members of the US Congress are dependent upon funding from large donors. Lessig sees the system as "legal but corrupt", and that the pivotal point of the corruption is campaign finance. In Lessig's view, it is a systemic problem. He noted that congresspersons spend three of every five weekdays raising money for reelection. It leads to inertia: left-leaning Occupy Wall Street activists see little progress on legislation dealing with global warming, while right-leaning Tea Party activists see little progress on simplifying the tax code. According to Lessig, congresspersons being dependent on large donors affects the ability of Congress to govern, whether or not donations actually change the way members of Congress vote on measures. A poll conducted for the book showed that the American public is cynical about American politics: that 71% of Republicans and 81% of Democrats believed that "money buys results in Congress". Lessig also points out Congress's low approval rating—11% as of the writing of the book (9% as of October 2011). He suggested that the system encouraged congresspersons to take up less-than-important issues for the purpose of intimidating corporations to encourage them to become campaign contributors:

Our current tax system with all its complexities is in part designed to make it easier for candidates, in particular congressmen, to raise money to get back to congress ... All sorts of special exceptions which expire after a limited period of time are just a reason to pick up the phone and call somebody and say 'Your exception is about to expire, here's a good reason for you to help us fight to get it to extend.' And that gives them the opportunity to practice what is really a type of extortion – shaking the trees of money in the private sector into their campaign coffers so that they can run for congress again.

— Lawrence Lessig, 2011

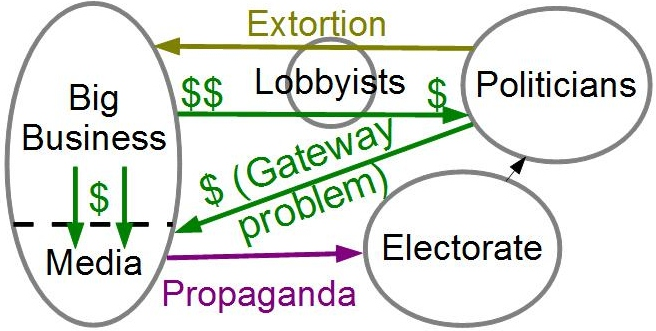
Diagram of the corrupt system described in Republic, Lost

This is summarized in the accompanying diagram: To obtain the money needed to get elected, incumbent politicians spend between 30 and 70 percent of their time soliciting money from big businesses, who pay because they get between $6 and $220 (according to different studies) for each $1 "invested" in lobbying and political campaigns.

== Illogical decision-making ==
Lessig illustrates his principle by discussing four situations, which he calls "The Tells": the complex system of subsidies and tariffs that have led to the rise of corn-fed beef and high fructose corn syrup in the American diet, the regulations governing pollution and copyright infringement, the existence of tenure for public school teachers, and the lack of regulation in the derivatives market. For each of the Tells, Lessig identifies what could be an illogical choice made over years of Congressional decision-making, and ends with a statement similar to the following:

[Ask] yourself one question only:

Not: Did the contributions and lobbying buy this apparently inconsistent result?
Instead: Do the contributions and lobbying make it harder to believe that this is a principled or consistent or sensible result?

== Lobbying ==
The middle chapters of the book describe in detail the system of lobbying in the United States, along with possible explanations of the effects of special interest money on legislation, borrowing from Clawson et al. the idea that lobbying creates a gift economy that changes the way laws are made, and affects what laws are passed.

Lessig refers repeatedly to Robert Kaiser's book So Damn Much Money, which also discusses lobbying in Congress. Kaiser is a journalist for the Washington Post who did a series of articles on lobbyist Gerald Cassidy. Lessig quoted congressperson Jim Cooper who remarked that Congress had become a "Farm League for K Street" in the sense that congresspersons were focused on lucrative lobbying careers after Congress rather than on serving the public interest while serving.

One almost trivial example relates to tax simplification: A large group of companies and individuals make money from helping their clients negotiate the complexity of the US income tax system—and would lose money if it were simpler. The Internal Revenue Service (IRS) gets most of the information needed to complete an income tax return for most citizens and could send taxpayers a draft return. Taxpayers could either accept the IRS bill as is, submit it with modifications (similar to how consumers challenge charges on a credit card they didn't make), or create a new one completely from scratch. Intuit, the developer of tax preparation software TurboTax, spent over $1.7 million to kill a program like this in California (ReadyReturn).

"Intuit has [also] lobbied hard to make sure taxpayers aren't allowed to e-file directly to the IRS," according to Martin Kaste reporting for NPR:

The IRS recommends that taxpayers file electronically — e-filing saves the government time and money, and is more accurate than IRS employees who type in the data from paper returns. But the IRS refuses to set up its own Web portal to receive the filings. Instead, most Americans have no choice but to e-file through private companies like Intuit (Turbo Tax) and HR Block (Tax Cut). In most cases, the companies charge an extra fee for e-filing. In other countries, free and direct electronic filing is a given. ... Steve Ryan, a lawyer for the tax-preparation industry who negotiated a deal that has the IRS promising not to set up its own Web portal for e-filing, says his argument was simple. "When the government becomes my competitor," Ryan says, "then I have every right to run an ad that says 'Big Brother is watching your keystrokes.'" and actually reduces the cost to the government of processing the tax returns.

The direct cost of preparing and filing all business and personal tax returns is estimated to be $100 to $150 billion each year. The U.S. Government Accountability Office estimated in 2005 that the efficiency cost of the tax system—the output that is lost over and above the tax itself—is between $240 billion and $600 billion per year—between 1 and 5 percent of Gross domestic product (GDP) while federal taxes represented 16.8 percent of GDP. Thus, for every dollar collected in federal taxes, Americans spend between 6 and 30 cents additional for tax preparation and doing things that are otherwise contrary to their own and society's interests to reduce their tax burden.

The return on investment in lobbying and political campaigns has been estimated at between $6 and $220 (22,000 percent) in different studies cited by Lessig. The returns to legitimate business opportunities are much smaller, which is why the money flowing into lobbying and political campaigns continues to increase.

For all the reasons cited above (and many more described in the book), Lessig concludes that, "corruption is the gateway problem: until we solve it, we won't solve any number of other critical problems facing this nation.

== Democracy vouchers ==
Lessig supports "Democracy Vouchers", which would return to each citizen the first $50 in taxes each pays a Democracy Voucher worth $50 that could only be contributed to candidate(s) or issue campaign(s). The $50 would be chosen to exceed the sum of all money spent in the previous 2- or 4-year election cycle. Candidates and issue campaigns could get this money only if they agreed to accept only Democracy Vouchers and contributions capped at double this amount per individual or group contributor. The current population of the United States is over 300 million. If half of those participated in this system, that's $7.5 billion. "In 2010 the total amount raised and spent in all congressional elections was $1.8 billion. The total amount contributed to the two major political parties was $2.8 billion." To put this in perspective, Lessig notes that "In 2009, the Cato Institute estimated that the U.S. Congress spent $90 billion on 'corporate welfare.'" If this system reduced corporate welfare by only 10 percent, it would more than cover the cost.

Lessig called this Democracy Voucher plan The Grant and Franklin Project, because Grant is on a $50 bill, and Franklin is on a $100 bill. This plan is similar to one proposed by Bruce Ackerman in 2003 called Patriot Dollars or voting with dollars.

== Strategies for improvement ==
Lessig proposed four different approaches to getting real reform implemented:

1. Congress could pass a law reforming campaign funding;
2. A popular, non-politician "supercandidate" could run for the House of Representatives in multiple jurisdictions in the same state, promising to stay in the race until other candidates promise to reform their campaign funding procedures;
3. An elected president could prevent the government from functioning until Congress enacts campaign finance reform;
4. A Constitutional Convention could propose a Constitutional Amendment requiring campaign finance reform.

Of the approaches, Lessig suggested that the fourth strategy was the most probable to succeed. Lessig argued that a constitutional convention would get around debilitating Supreme Court decisions which allow virtually unrestricted campaign contributions under the banner of free speech.

== A second Constitutional Convention ==
In that vein, along with Tea Party leader Mark Meckler, Lessig held the Conference on the Constitutional Convention at Harvard University on 24 September 2011. His keynote address was an abbreviated version of the content in Republic, Lost, and he reiterated his support for a new Constitutional Convention to propose amendments which would reduce the influence of lobbyists.

== Related work ==
Media scholar Robert W. McChesney's work emphasizes the role of the media in enabling the corruption described in Republic, Lost. McChesney's Problem of the Media discusses the narrowing of the range of acceptable political discourse the flowed from increased concentration of ownership of the media (growth of the major media conglomerates), asserting "that investigative journalism has all but disappeared from the nation's commercial airwaves." Nichols and McChesney criticize sharply the US media for complicity in warmongering in Tragedy and Farce: How the American Media Sell Wars, Spin Elections, and Destroy Democracy. They claim that substantive reform is needed in the structure of the media industry.

A study of 14 congressional hearings reported that 1,014 witnesses argued in favor of programs, while only 7 argued against. These observations suggest a solution approach complementary to Lessig's "Grant and Franklin Project", mentioned above: Increasing independent funding for investigative journalism and political action to get more experts to oppose crony capitalist legislation / corporate welfare. Suggestions of this nature were made by McChesney and Nichols in The Death and Life of American Journalism. They cite studies suggesting that the public in other countries tend to be better informed and better engaged politically than in the US as a result of public funding of investigative journalism analogous to what Generals Eisenhower and MacArthur imposed upon Germany and Japan after World War II.

== Related issues ==
In conjunction with other efforts, Lessig has started an activist group called Rootstrikers. Lessig made comments at Zuccotti Park in solidarity with Occupy Wall Street protesters, reiterating many of the points from Republic, Lost, and exhorted the Occupy movement to ally with the Tea Party movement to fight government corruption.

== See also ==
- Campaign finance reform
- Free culture
- Earmarks
- Lobbying in the United States
- Lobbyist
- Buddy Roemer
