= Robert W. McChesney =

American media studies scholar (1952–2025)

- Born: Robert Waterman McChesney; December 22, 1952; Cleveland, Ohio, U.S.
- Died: March 25, 2025 (aged 72); Madison, Wisconsin, U.S.
- Occupations: Professor, author, activist, journalist
- Known for: Media criticism; History and political economy of mass communication
- Spouse: Inger Stole
- Children: 2

Academic background
- Education: Evergreen State College; University of Washington
- Website: robertmcchesney.org

Robert Waterman McChesney (/məkˈtʃɛsni/; December 22, 1952 – March 25, 2025) was an American professor notable in the history and political economy of communications, and the role media play in democratic and capitalist societies. He was the Gutgsell Endowed Professor in the Department of Communication at the University of Illinois at Urbana–Champaign. He co-founded Free Press, a national media reform organization. From 2002 to 2012, he hosted Media Matters, a weekly radio program every Sunday afternoon on WILL (AM), Illinois Public Media radio.

== Background and education ==
McChesney was born in Cleveland, Ohio, on December 22, 1952, to Samuel Parker McChesney, an advertising salesman for This Week magazine, and his wife Edna Margaret "Meg" (née McCorkle) McChesney, a nurse. He grew up in Shaker Heights, Ohio, and attended The Evergreen State College in Olympia, Washington, where he studied history and political economy.

== Career ==
After college, McChesney worked for a time as a sports stringer for United Press International (UPI) and published a weekly newspaper. In 1979, he was the founding publisher of The Rocket, a Seattle-based rock music magazine that chronicled the birth of the Seattle rock scene of the late 1980s and 1990s.

McChesney began to report on the media itself and became an expert in the field, entering academic studies in this area. He did graduate work at the University of Washington, obtaining a PhD in Communications there in 1989. He was the Gutgsell Endowed Professor in the Department of Communication of the University of Illinois at Urbana–Champaign. He also taught at the University of Wisconsin–Madison.

=== Assessment of the media ===
McChesney said the term "deregulated media" was a misnomer. He described media organizations as a government-sanctioned oligopoly, owned by a few highly profitable corporate entities. They have legislative influence and control news coverage and can distort public understanding of media issues.

In his article "Farewell To Journalism" (October 2012), McChesney described what he considered the deterioration of the current U.S. media system; he said that this freefall threatens the democratic system itself. He highlights what scholars believe to be the key characteristics of healthy journalism, and says, "It is necessary...that the media system as a whole makes such journalism a realistic expectation for the citizenry."

McChesney proposed a $200 annual Citizenship News Voucher to support journalism.

A backer of Bernie Sanders's 2016 and 2020 presidential bids, McChesney was critical of how major news outlets covered Sanders's campaigns.

== Personal life and death ==
McChesney and his wife, Inger Stole, had two daughters. He died from glioblastoma at his home in Madison, Wisconsin, on March 25, 2025, at the age of 72.

== Bibliography ==
- People Get Ready: The Fight Against a Jobless Economy and a Citizenless Democracy. Nation Books. March 8, 2016. ISBN 9781568585215.
- Blowing the Roof Off the Twenty-First Century: Media, Politics, and the Struggle for Post-Capitalist Democracy. NYU Press. October 22, 2014. ISBN 978-1-58367-478-9.
- Nichols, John; McChesney, Robert W (2013). Dollarocracy: How Billionaires Are Buying Our Democracy and What We Can Do About It. Nation Books. ISBN 978-1-56858-711-0.
- Digital Disconnect: How Capitalism is Turning the Internet Against Democracy. New Press. March 5, 2013. ISBN 978-1-59558-891-3.
- Foster, John Bellamy; McChesney, Robert W. (September 1, 2012). The Endless Crisis: How Monopoly-Finance Capital Produces Stagnation and Upheaval from the USA to China. NYU Press. ISBN 978-1-58367-314-0.
- Nichols, John; McChesney, Robert W. (2010). The Death and Life of American Journalism: The Media Revolution that Will Begin the World Again. Nation Books. ISBN 9781568586052.
- The Political Economy of Media: Enduring Issues, Emerging Dilemmas. NYU Press. May 1, 2008. ISBN 978-1-58367-161-0.
- Communication Revolution: Critical Junctures and the Future of Media. New Press. 2007. ISBN 9781595582072.
- The Problem of the Media: U.S. Communication Politics in the 21st Century. Monthly Review Press. 2004. ISBN 978-1583671054.
- Herman, Edward S.; McChesney, Robert W. (August 27, 2001). Global Media: The New Missionaries of Global Capitalism. A&C Black. ISBN 978-0-8264-5819-3.
- Rich Media, Poor Democracy: Communication Politics in Dubious Times. New Press. June 2, 1999. ISBN 978-1-62097-070-6.

== See also ==
- Fourth Estate
- Fifth Estate
