= Joe Trippi =

American political strategist (born 1956)

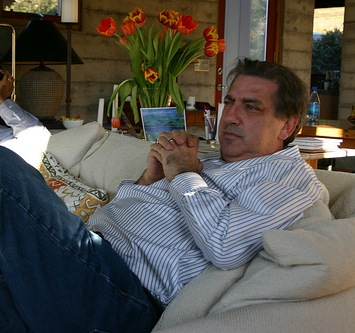
- Trippi in 2008
- Born: Joseph Paul Trippi; June 10, 1956 (age 70); Jamestown, New York, U.S.
- Education: San Jose State University (no degree)
- Occupation: Political strategist
- Political party: Democratic

Joseph Paul Trippi (born June 10, 1956) is an American political strategist. A member of the Democratic Party, Trippi most notably served as campaign manager of former Vermont governor Howard Dean's 2004 presidential bid, and has served as a political commentator for CNN since 2018. He has worked on a number of prominent gubernatorial and United States Senate campaigns, including the successful bids of Jerry Brown for Governor of California and Doug Jones for U.S. Senate in Alabama.

== Early life and education ==
Trippi was born in Jamestown, New York and raised in Los Angeles, California. Trippi began his career in the mid-1970s working on several local elections in San Jose, California while he was attending San Jose State University, before leaving college a few credits shy of graduation to join the Ted Kennedy 1980 presidential campaign. During college he was a member of Sigma Nu fraternity.

== Career ==
Trippi served as Deputy Campaign Manager for Los Angeles Mayor Tom Bradley's successful reelection bid in 1981 and his unsuccessful run in the 1982 California gubernatorial election. During Bradley's gubernatorial campaign, Trippi installed one of the first in-house computers for a political campaign, the DEC-PDP11. Trippi used it for fundraising and targeting.

=== National ===
In 2010, Trippi was a senior strategist and media consultant in Jerry Brown's successful run for reelection as California Governor. The Brown ads Trippi & Associates produced received four Pollie awards for excellence in political media and Time named one ad, "Echo," the best ad of 2010. Andrew Romanoff, who challenged the incumbent Senator Michael Bennet in the 2010 United States Senate election in Colorado, announced his campaign had hired Trippi as one of its four new consultants.

Trippi worked on a number of recent House victories for Representatives Ro Khanna, Tulsi Gabbard, Janice Hahn, Mark Takano, and Seth Moulton. Moulton, a former Marine from Massachusetts, won in a shocking come-from-behind upset. The campaign overcame millions in outside spending to beat 18-year incumbent John Tierney in the primary and Richard Tisei in the targeted general election. In a 2015 article from The Boston Globe, Moulton recalled nationally renowned pollster Mark Mellman telling him to quit the race because it would be "statistically impossible" to win.

In 2017, Trippi worked on the special election to fill the Senate seat vacated by Jeff Sessions on behalf of former US Attorney for the Northern District of Alabama Doug Jones. In his victory speech, Jones referred to Trippi as the "greatest political consultant in the world".

After the historic come-from-behind victory in Alabama, Trippi worked for Democratic candidates in both of the 2018 United States Senate elections in Mississippi Trippi worked with Howard Sherman for seat held by incumbent Roger Wicker, and with former Secretary of Agriculture Mike Espy in the special election for the Senate seat vacated by Thad Cochran who decided to resign for health reasons. In 2018, Trippi worked on the campaign of Janet Garrett, a retired schoolteacher and union leader running to unseat the conservative founder of the Freedom Caucus, U.S. Rep. Jim Jordan, in Ohio's 4th congressional district.

Trippi served as senior adviser to Senator Doug Jones and Senate candidate Teresa Tomlinson.

Trippi joined The Lincoln Project in July 2021 as a senior advisor.

=== International ===
Trippi has also worked on international political campaigns over the years. In 1993, Trippi worked for then-PASOK leader Andreas Papandreou’s successful campaign of Prime Minister of Greece, as well as for his son, George Papandreou in 2007. Trippi advised former British Prime Minister Tony Blair in 2005. In 2006, he worked for Romano Prodi on his winning race for Prime Minister of Italy.

In 2008, Trippi helped Morgan Tsvangirai and Zimbabwe’s opposition party, the Movement for Democratic Change receive the most votes over Robert Mugabe in elections marred by violence. He also brought media attention to Mugabe’s democratic subversion and violence which led to a unity government and Tsvangarai becoming the Prime Minister of Zimbabwe. As part of the unity government, Tsvangirai designated Roy Bennett as Deputy Minister of Agriculture on February 10, 2009. But Mugabe refused to swear Bennett into office, and three days later Bennett was arrested and charged with treason. Tsvangirai’s party reported that Bennett was being denied food in prison. Trippi led an international campaign to put pressure on Mugabe to release Bennett, and days after his release on March 12, Bennett thanked Trippi for his efforts.

Trippi was hired by the Libertas political party to work on their campaign for the 2009 European Parliament election.

In January 2010, Michael Hastings reported that Joe Trippi was working in Iraq to help launch a secular moderate Shiite party: the Ahrar party headed by Iyad Jamal Al-Din. A day later, Hastings also reported that 20 of Ahrar’s candidates had been struck from the ballot.

Beginning in October 2011, Trippi advised on the implementation of the recommendations of the Bahrain Independent Commission of Inquiry, which was tasked with looking into the incidents that occurred during the period of unrest in Bahrain in February and March 2011, saying he "had no problem working for them" because they were "one of the progressive countries in the Middle Eastern Gulf." The commission released a 500-page report which criticized security forces and provided various conclusions, observations, and recommendations to the government. Trippi ended his work in Bahrain in April 2012.

In 2011, Trippi provided strategic support for the campaign of Goodluck Jonathan in the Nigerian presidential election. In 2015, Trippi helped guide the new media strategy for the election of Nigerian President Goodluck Jonathan, helping him build a following of over 800,000 Nigerians and leading CNN to declare Jonathan the “Facebook President.”

Trippi served as a senior strategist for Cyril Ramaphosa’s successful bid for African National Congress President in 2017, leading to Ramaphosa becoming the President of South Africa.

== Political campaigns ==
=== 1984 presidential election ===
Trippi remained in California to hold his first and only government position as Lieutenant Governor Leo T. McCarthy's Deputy Chief of Staff, before overseeing several successes in Vice President Walter Mondale’s 1984 campaign for the Democratic presidential nomination. Starting with a come-from-behind victory at the Maine State Convention, Trippi eventually managed operations as the state director in Iowa and Pennsylvania, where Mondale won by 30 and 14 points respectively.

=== 1984–1988 ===
Following the Mondale campaign, Trippi joined Senator Ted Kennedy’s PAC, the Fund for a Democratic Majority, as Deputy Director under Paul Tully. At the time, Bob Shrum was chairman of the committee, but he soon resigned to start the media firm Caddell, Doak and Shrum, taking Trippi with him to be Vice President of the firm. During Trippi’s tenure at what became Doak and Shrum, the firm worked on several media campaigns for gubernatorial and senatorial candidates including those of Virginia Governor Gerald Baliles, Senator Alan Cranston of California, Senator Barbara Mikulski of Maryland, and Pennsylvania Governor Bob Casey. Shrum has attributed Trippi with conceiving and producing the famous spot on Cranston’s campaign, "Zschau’s Greatest Hits".

=== 1988 presidential election ===
External videos
- Gephart "Hyundai" TV Spot, YouTube video

In 1987, Trippi left Doak and Shrum to work on Gary Hart’s 1988 presidential bid with former colleague Paul Tully as deputy political director. He was assigned to manage reporters who surrounded the Hart home in Colorado, where Hart's wife, Lee, was on the weekend when the Donna Rice story broke. Trippi lied to a Pinkerton guard in the presence of reporters at the gate of the property -- saying that residents of the home were about to go to sleep -- to cover the subsequent, surreptitious escape of Lee Hart, hiding on the floor of a van Trippi was driving. Two days later, as Gary and Lee Hart flew back from New Hampshire to Colorado to announce he was suspending his campaign, Trippi took part in staging a press motorcade to a canceled Hart event, a subterfuge intended to delay discovery of Hart's flight.

He joined Dick Gephardt's team as deputy campaign manager after Hart withdrew from the race. There, Trippi was instrumental in the creation of the "Hyundai" ad, a television spot which received praise for launching Gephardt from last place in the polls to winning the Iowa caucuses.

=== 1992 presidential election ===
During the 1992 election cycle, Trippi consulted on the Presidential campaigns of Governor Douglas Wilder of Virginia and Jerry Brown of California. For Brown's campaign, Trippi and colleague Joe Costello orchestrated the first successful use of an 800 number in politics, raising $8 million by advertising the number on television and during debates.

=== 1992–2004 ===
Throughout the rest of the 1990s, Trippi worked as a media consultant and producer for multiple successful congressional races, including Ron Wyden’s run for Oregon's Senate seat, Jim Moran's in Virginia’s 8th district, and Marjorie Margolies-Mezvinsky's in Pennsylvania’s 13th district, which had been held by a Republican for almost 90 years.

In 2002, when five Democratic congressmen were redistricted into Republican majority districts and forced in contests against Republican incumbents, Trippi worked as a strategist and media consultant for Congressman Tim Holden, the only one of the five to win.

=== 2004 presidential election ===
As national campaign manager for Vermont Governor Howard Dean’s presidential campaign in 2004, Trippi used online technology to organize what he envisioned would become "the largest grassroots movement" in presidential politics at the time. One of these methods included the blog entitled Blog for America where the campaign could communicate directly with supporters. Another was DeanTV, an online streaming platform playing videos and clips from the campaign trail. The campaign also developed technology for a social media site that enabled supporters to connect and campaign for Dean together. Through this innovative use of the Internet for small-donor fundraising, "Dean for America" raised more money than any Democratic presidential campaign to that point – all with donations averaging less than $100.

=== 2004–2017 ===
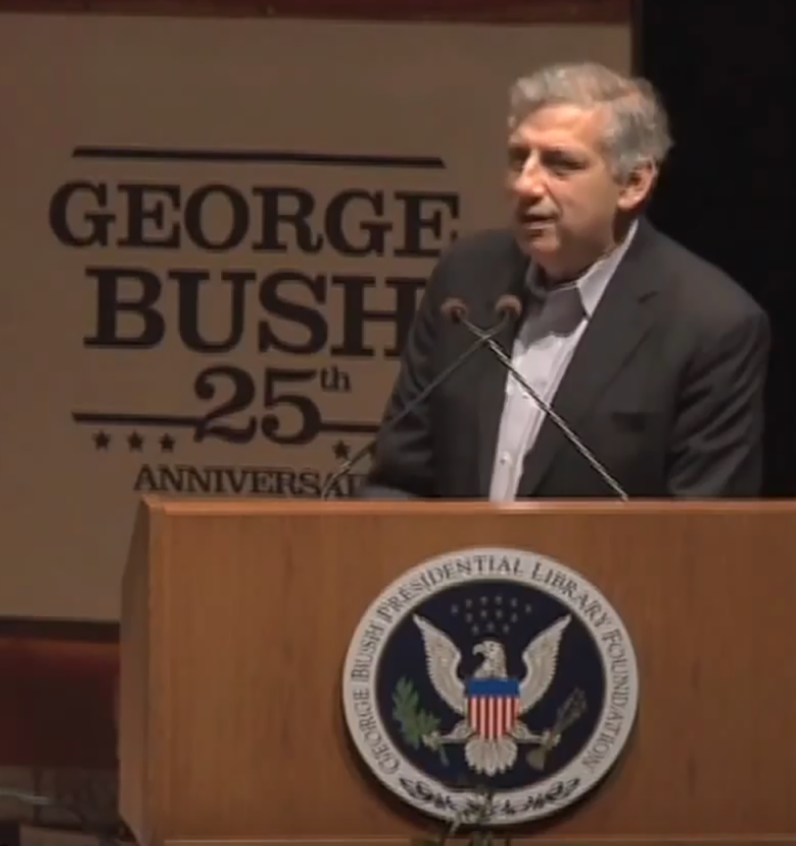
Trippi discussing technology and civic engagement in 2014 at a 25th anniversary celebration of George H.W. Bush's presidency

Trippi joined Jerry Brown again in 2006 serving as media consultant and strategist for his successful bid for California Attorney General. During this cycle he also produced the media for John Hall’s winning campaign for New York's 19th congressional district. John Edwards hired Trippi in 2007 as a senior adviser for his 2008 presidential campaign. He also worked as media strategist and a senior adviser for Doug Jones' successful campaign in the 2017 U.S. Senate special election in Alabama, running for the seat left open when Jeff Sessions was appointed as Attorney General.

== Other work and advocacy ==
Apart from campaign politics, Trippi has been involved in many other facets of the political world. He was named a fellow at the Harvard Institute of Politics and at the New Politics Institute, a think tank of the New Democrat Network. He also serves on the advisory board to nonpartisan organization Why Tuesday? that encourages increased voter participation. He founded the consultancies Trippi & Associates and Trippi International in 2004. He has had roles on various cable and broadcast networks, previously as a contributor on MSNBC and Fox News, and a political analyst on CBS News.

Trippi has consulted with a number of leading non-profits and corporations including the Humane Society of the United States, the American Cancer Society, Best Friends Animal Society, Monster.com, Toyota, Daimler AG, SES Americom, Corning Inc., LabCorp, IBM, Lionsgate Films, Best Buy, and Wave Systems.

== Personal life ==
Trippi is a resident of the Eastern Shore of Maryland.

== Published work ==
- Joe Trippi (July 6, 2004). The Revolution Will Not Be Televised: Democracy, the Internet, and the Overthrow of Everything. William Morrow. ISBN 978-0-06-076155-4.
