= My Dinner with Adolf =

2025 satirical essay by Larry David

- Short story by Larry David
- Lia Darjes' "Plate VII", which is the article's cover image

Publication
- Published in: The New York Times (guest essays)
- Publication date: April 21, 2025 (Note: Appeared in print on April 25, 2025.)

"My Dinner with Adolf" is a satirical short story by American comedian Larry David originally published in the opinion section of The New York Times in 2025. Written in first person, it takes place in 1939, telling the story of a man who has dinner with Adolf Hitler despite being his detractor. It was seen as a repudiation of comedian Bill Maher, a vocal Trump critic who dined with U.S. President Donald Trump.

== Background ==
On March 31, 2025, comedian Bill Maher had a dinner with Donald Trump, Dana White, and Kid Rock at the White House. The dinner was planned by Rock, a vocal supporter of Trump. Maher explained on the March 23, 2025, episode of his podcast Club Random, that Kid Rock organized the meeting after appearing on the podcast as well as Real Time with Bill Maher earlier in the year.

On the April 11, 2025, episode of Real Time, Maher recounted his experience, praising Trump as "gracious and measured". The dinner was criticized by León Krauze and Keith Olbermann. In a Washington Post opinion piece, Krauze compared Maher's remarks to similar praise given to authoritarian figures such as Fidel Castro, Joseph Stalin, and Mao Zedong.

== Synopsis ==
In early 1939, the unnamed narrator receives an invitation to have dinner with Adolf Hitler at the Reich Chancellery in Berlin. Although a vocal critic of Hitler, he accepts, despite the objections of his own supporters.

He arrives at the Chancellery two weeks later, where he joins Heinrich Himmler, Hermann Göring, Leni Riefenstahl, and Prince Edward, Duke of Windsor. When Hitler enters the room, the narrator is surprised by his friendly demeanor. During dinner, the narrator is impressed by Hitler's sense of humor; the Führer makes a teasing joke at Göring's expense about killing Jews, Romanis, and homosexuals. Throughout the meal, Hitler engages the narrator in mundane personal conversation, for example, asking about his recent breakup and offering advice.

After dinner, Hitler and the narrator acknowledge their political differences, but opt to remain cordial. The narrator gives Hitler a Nazi salute and leaves.

== Analysis ==
Although the essay never mentions Maher or Trump by name, multiple outlets reported the opinion piece as a satire of Maher's dinner with Trump and his subsequent praise of him.

Patrick Healy, deputy opinion editor at The New York Times, confirmed this in a companion piece that was published in the Times. He said that while the paper maintains strict editorial standards for satire—especially regarding Nazi references—David's essay was accepted because it commented on the broader human tendency to misinterpret limited personal interactions as meaningful reflections of character. Healy emphasized that David was not equating Trump with Hitler, but illustrating the danger of mistaking surface-level civility for moral decency.

== Reactions ==
Representative Jared Huffman shared the essay and opined on X that it was a necessary read for people, including Maher, who think "normalizing and humanizing Trump is a good idea". Scott Jennings critiqued the essay on air on CNN, characterizing it as an effort to intimidate comedians and others on the left from engaging with Trump in the future.

=== Bill Maher ===
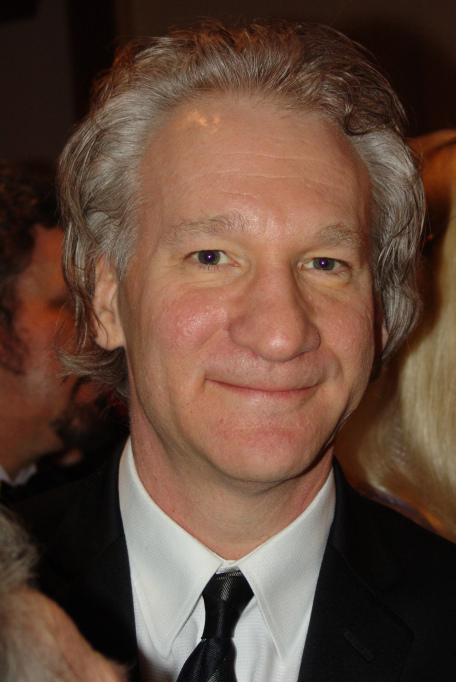
Maher at the 1998 White House Correspondents' Dinner

The piece drew sharp criticism from Maher. In an interview on Piers Morgan Uncensored on April 24, 2025, Maher called the essay "insulting to 6 million dead Jews", arguing that invoking Hitler in this context was inappropriate and inflammatory. Maher stated, "The minute you play the 'Hitler' card, you've lost the argument," and defended his meeting with Trump as an honest reporting of his personal impressions without abandoning his political criticisms.

Maher also said, "Nobody has been harder, and more prescient, I must say, about Donald Trump than me. I don't need to be lectured on who Donald Trump is. Just the fact that I met him in person didn't change that. The fact that I reported honestly is not a sin either." Maher also confirmed that he and David had not spoken since the essay's publication but left open the possibility of reconciliation.

In July 2025, My Dinner with Adolf drew renewed attention following the announcement of a historical sketch comedy series, Life, Larry and the Pursuit of Unhappiness (2026), co-created by David and Barack Obama for HBO Max. The project was interpreted by some as a continued satirical response to Bill Maher, highlighting the essay's sustained relevance months after its publication.

In a November 2025 episode of Real Time, Maher again criticized David's satirical essay saying, "Every year, I used to ask Larry David to do Real Time and he'd always say, 'Bill, I can't. I'm not smart enough about politics to do your show.' Yeah, I get that now."

== See also ==
- Black comedy
