= Fascist (insult) =

Use of the word as a pejorative

The word fascist has been used as a pejorative or insult against a wide range of people, political movements, governments, and institutions since the emergence of fascism in Europe in the 1920s. Political commentators on both the left and the right accused their opponents of being fascists, starting in the years before World War II.

In 1928, the Communist International labeled their social democratic opponents as social fascists, while the social democrats themselves as well as some parties on the political right accused the Communists of having become fascist under Joseph Stalin's leadership. In light of the Molotov–Ribbentrop Pact, The New York Times declared on 18 September 1939 that, "Hitlerism is brown communism, Stalinism is red fascism." Later, in 1944, the socialist and anti-fascist writer George Orwell commented that fascism had been rendered almost meaningless by its common use as an insult against various people, and argued that in England the word fascist had become a synonym for bully.

During the Cold War, the Soviet Union was categorized by its former World War II allies as totalitarian alongside fascist Nazi Germany to convert pre-World War II anti-fascism into post-war anti-communism, and debates around the comparison of Nazism and Stalinism intensified. Both sides in the Cold War also used the insults fascist and fascism against the other. In the Soviet Union, they were used to describe anti-Soviet activism, and East Germany officially referred to the Berlin Wall as the "Anti-Fascist Protection Wall". Across the Eastern Bloc, the term anti-fascist became synonymous with the Communist state–party line and denoted the struggle against dissenters and the broader Western world. In the United States, early supporters of an aggressive foreign policy and domestic anti-communist measures in the 1940s and 1950s labeled the Soviet Union as fascist, and stated that it posed the same threat as the Axis powers had posed during World War II. Accusations that the enemy was fascist were used to justify opposition to negotiations and compromise, with the argument that the enemy would always act in a manner similar to Adolf Hitler or Nazi Germany in the 1930s. In the 21st century, Vladimir Putin’s government justified the Russo-Ukrainian War by claiming that Ukraine is Nazi.

== The Communist International and the Soviet bloc ==
The Bolshevik movement and later the Soviet Union made frequent use of the fascist insult coming from its conflict with the early German and Italian fascist movements. Meanwhile, accusations that the leaders of the Soviet Union during the Stalin era acted as red fascists were commonly stated by both left-wing and right-wing critics.

The fascist label was widely used in press and political language to describe the ideological opponents of the Bolsheviks, such as the White movement. Later, from 1928 to the mid-1930s, during the Third Period, it was even applied to social democracy, which was called social fascism and even regarded by communist parties as the most dangerous form of fascism for a time. In Germany, the Communist Party of Germany, which had been largely controlled by the Soviet leadership since 1928, used the insult fascism to describe both the Social Democratic Party (SPD) and the Nazi Party (NSDAP). This position was abandoned at the Seventh Congress of the Comintern in 1935, with a turn to a Popular Front policy of allying with "bourgeois" parties against fascism. Georgi Dimitrov, the General Secretary of the Comintern, made a speech criticising the earlier ultra-left position:

there has been a tendency among us to contemplate fascism in general, without taking into account the specific features of the fascist movement in the various countries, erroneously classifying all reactionary measures of the bourgeoisie as fascism and going so far as calling the entire non-Communist camp fascist. The struggle against fascism was not strengthened but rather weakened in consequence. Even now we still have survivals of a stereotyped approach to the question of fascism. When some comrades assert that Roosevelt's 'New Deal' represents an even clearer and more pronounced form of the development of the bourgeoisie toward fascism than the 'National Government' in Great Britain, for example, is this not a manifestation of such a stereotyped approach to the question? One must be very partial to hackneyed schemes not to see that the most partial to reactionary circles of American finance capital, which are attacking Roosevelt, are above all the very force which is stimulating and organizing the fascist movement in the United States, Not to see the beginnings of real fascism in the United States behind the hypocritical outpourings of these circles 'in defence of the democratic rights of the American citizen' is tantamount to misleading the working class in the struggle against its worst enemy.

In Soviet usage, the German Nazis were described as fascists until 1939, when the Molotov–Ribbentrop Pact was signed, after which Nazi–Soviet relations started to be presented positively in Soviet propaganda. After the German invasion of the Soviet Union in 1941, fascist was used in the USSR to describe virtually any anti-Soviet activity or opinion. Later, the international investigation on Katyn massacre was described as "fascist libel" and the Warsaw Uprising as "illegal and organised by fascists". In Poland during the Polish People's Republic, communist propaganda referred to the Home Army (Polish: Armia Krajowa) as a fascist organization. Polish Communist Security Service (Polish: Służba Bezpieczeństwa) described Trotskyism, Titoism, and imperialism as "variants of fascism".

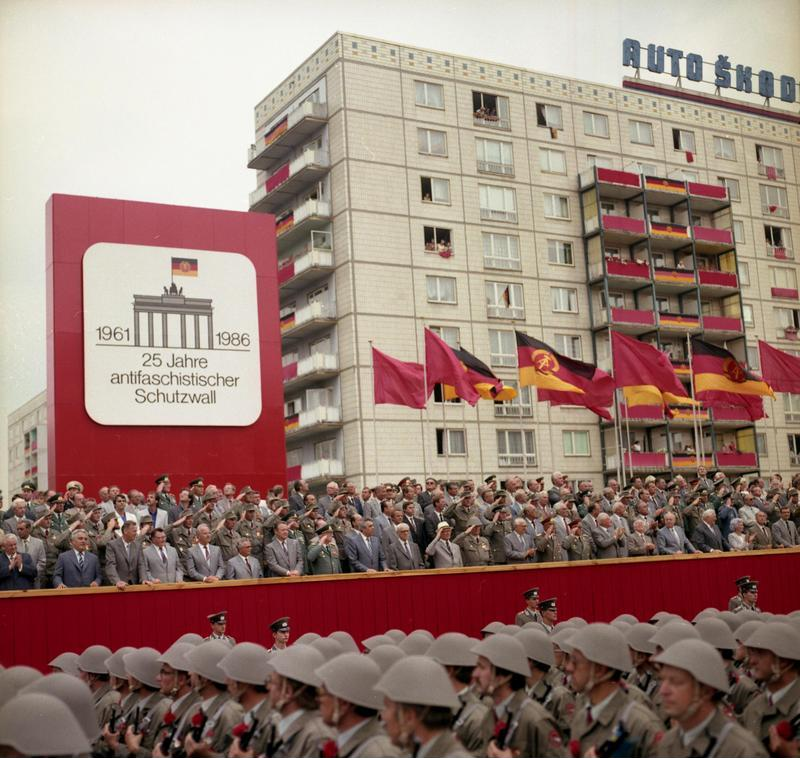
East German military parade in Karl-Marx-Allee, East Berlin in August 1986, celebrating the "25th anniversary of the Anti-Fascist Protection Wall", the official name of the Berlin Wall

This use continued into the Cold War era and up to the dissolution of the Soviet Union. The official Soviet version of the Hungarian Revolution of 1956 was described as "Fascist, Hitlerite, reactionary and counter-revolutionary hooligans financed by the imperialist West [which] took advantage of the unrest to stage a counter-revolution". Some rank-and-file Soviet soldiers reportedly believed they were being sent to East Berlin to fight German fascists. The Soviet-backed German Democratic Republic's official name for the Berlin Wall was the Anti-Fascist Protection Rampart (German: Antifaschistischer Schutzwall).

After the Warsaw Pact invasion of Czechoslovakia in 1968, Chinese Premier Zhou Enlai denounced the Soviet Union for "fascist politics, great power chauvinism, national egoism and social imperialism", comparing the invasion to the Vietnam War and the German occupation of Czechoslovakia. During the Barricades in January 1991, which followed the May 1990 "On the Restoration of Independence of the Republic of Latvia" independence declaration of the Republic of Latvia from the Soviet Union, the Communist Party of the Soviet Union declared that "fascism was reborn in Latvia".

In 2006, the European Court of Human Rights (ECHR) found contrary to the Article 10 (freedom of expression) of the ECHR fining a journalist for calling a right-wing journalist "local neo-fascist", regarding the statement as a value-judgment acceptable in the circumstances.

== Postwar Europe ==
In 1944, the English writer, democratic socialist and anti-fascist George Orwell wrote about the term's overuse as an insult, arguing:

It will be seen that, as used, the word 'Fascism' is almost entirely meaningless. In conversation, of course, it is used even more wildly than in print. I have heard it applied to farmers, shopkeepers, Social Credit, corporal punishment, fox-hunting, bull-fighting, the 1922 Committee, the 1941 Committee, Kipling, Gandhi, Chiang Kai-Shek, homosexuality, Priestley's broadcasts, Youth Hostels, astrology, women, dogs and I do not know what else. ... [T]he people who recklessly fling the word 'Fascist' in every direction attach at any rate an emotional significance to it. By 'Fascism' they mean, roughly speaking, something cruel, unscrupulous, arrogant, obscurantist, anti-liberal and benefit class. Except for the relatively Large number of Fascist sympathizers, almost any person would accept 'bully' as a synonym for 'Fascist'. That is about as near to a definition as this much-abused word has come.

In 1946, in his essay "Politics and the English Language", he wrote that "'Fascism' has now no meaning except in so far as it signifies something not desirable."

The American historian Stanley G. Payne has argued in the right-wing magazine First Things that after World War II fascism assumed a quasi-religious position within Western culture as a form of absolute moral evil. Payne further argued that it gave the term's use as an insult a particularly strong form of social power that any other equivalent term lacks, which encouraged its overuse as the term offered an extremely easy way to stigmatize and assert power over an opponent.

== Former Yugoslavia ==
During the 1990s, in the midst of the Yugoslav wars, Serbian media often disseminated inflammatory statements in order to stigmatize and dehumanize adversaries, with Croatians being denigrated as "Ustasha" (Croatian fascists). In modern Serbia, Dragan J. Vučićević, editor-in-chief of the tabloid and propaganda flagship Informer, holds the belief that the "vast majority of Croatian nation are Ustaše" and thus ''fascists'' and this notion is sometimes drawn in his tabloid's writing. After the EU banned Serbia from importing Russian oil through the Croatian Adriatic Pipeline in October 2022, the Serbian news station B92 wrote that the sanctions came after: "insisting of ustasha regime from Zagreb and its ustasha prime minister Andrej Plenković". Serbian politician Aleksandar Vulin has stated that modern-day Croatia is a "follower of Ante Pavelić's fascist ideology" and he has described the EU as "the club of countries which had their divisions under Stalingrad". In June 2022, Aleksandar Vučić was prevented from entering Croatia to visit the Jasenovac Memorial Site by Croatian authorities due to him not announcing his visit through official diplomatic channels which is a common practice. As a response, Serbian ministers labeled Andrej Plenković's government as "ustasha government" with some tabloids calling the Croatian nation fascist. German historian Alexander Korb compared these labels with Putin's labels of Ukraine being fascist as a pretext for his invasion of Ukraine.

In modern-day Bosnia and Herzegovina, the insult has been used by political opponents of Bosnian Serb leader Milorad Dodik, while Dodik himself has used it as a slur against the High Representative, Christian Schmidt.

It has also been used in the political discourse of Montenegro.

During the 2024–present Serbian anti-corruption protests, Vučić's pro-government media and members of Serbian Progressive Party labeled the protesting students and opposition figures as ustashe.

== United States ==
In the United States, fascist is used by both the left-wing and right-wing, and its use in American political discourse is contentious. Several U.S. presidencies have been described as fascistic. In 2004, Samantha Power, a lecturer at the John F. Kennedy School of Government at Harvard University, reflected Orwell's words from 60 years prior when she stated: "Fascism – unlike communism, socialism, capitalism, or conservatism – is a smear word more often used to brand one's foes than it is a descriptor used to shed light on them."

=== Use by the left ===
American leftists have often denounced parts of the American right as fascist. In her 1970 book Beyond Mere Obedience, radical activist and theologian Dorothee Sölle coined the term Christofascist to describe fundamentalist Christians.

In the 1980s, the term was used by leftist critics to describe the presidency of Ronald Reagan. The term was later used in the 2000s to describe the presidency of George W. Bush by its critics, and in the late 2010s and 2020s to describe the candidacy and presidencies of Donald Trump.

In response to multiple authors claiming that the then-presidential candidate Donald Trump was a fascist, a 2016 article for Vox cited five historians who study fascism, including Roger Griffin, author of The Nature of Fascism, who stated that Trump either does not hold and even is opposed to several political viewpoints that are integral to fascism, including viewing violence as an inherent good and an inherent rejection of or opposition to a democratic system.

A growing number of scholars have posited that the political style of Trump resembles that of fascist leaders, beginning with his election campaign in 2016, continuing over the course of his presidency as he appeared to court far-right extremists, including his failed efforts to overturn the 2020 United States presidential election results after losing to Joe Biden, and culminating in the 2021 United States Capitol attack. As these events have unfolded, some commentators who had initially resisted applying the label to Trump came out in favor of it, including conservative legal scholar Steven G. Calabresi and conservative commentator Michael Gerson. After the attack on the Capitol, the historian of fascism Robert O. Paxton went so far as to state that Trump is a fascist, despite his earlier objection to using the term in this way. Other historians of fascism such as Richard J. Evans, Griffin, and Stanley Payne continued to disagree that fascism is an appropriate term to describe Trump's politics.

Leading up to the 2024 presidential election, several political figures have described Trump as a fascist, including John F. Kelly, Mark Milley, Joe Biden, Tim Walz, and Kamala Harris. Following the attempted assassination of Donald Trump in Pennsylvania, Republican vice presidential nominee JD Vance wrote that "[t]he central premise of the Biden campaign is that President Trump is an authoritarian fascist who must be stopped at all costs. That rhetoric led directly to President Trump's attempted assassination". He also stated that Kelly and Milley are "disgruntled former employees".

=== Use by the right ===
In the American right wing, fascist is frequently used as an insult to imply that Nazism, and by extension fascism, was a socialist and left-wing ideology, which is contrary to the consensus among scholars of fascism. According to the History News Network, this belief that fascism is left-wing "has become widely accepted conventional wisdom among American conservatives, and has played a significant role in the national discourse". According to cultural critic Noah Berlatsky writing for NBC News, in an effort to erase leftist victims of Nazi violence, "they've actually inverted the truth, implying that Nazis themselves were leftists", and "are part of a history of far-right disavowal, projection and escalation intended to provide a rationale for retaliation".

An example of this belief is conservative columnist Jonah Goldberg's book Liberal Fascism, which depicts modern liberalism and progressivism in the United States as the children of fascism. Writing for The Washington Post, historian Ronald J. Granieri stated that this "has become a silver bullet for voices on the right like Dinesh D'Souza and Candace Owens: Not only is the reviled left, embodied in 2020 by figures like Sanders, Alexandria Ocasio-Cortez and Elizabeth Warren, a dangerous descendant of the Nazis, but anyone who opposes it can't possibly have ties to the Nazis' odious ideas. There is only one problem: This argument is untrue." Other examples include statements by Republican Representative Marjorie Taylor Greene, who has compared mask mandates during the COVID-19 pandemic to Nazi Germany and the Holocaust.

Rush Limbaugh and other conservatives have equated feminism with fascism by using the term “Feminazi.” Some on the right use the term "ecofascism" as a hyperbolic general pejorative against environmental activists, including more mainstream groups such as Greenpeace, prominent influencers such as Greta Thunberg, and government agencies tasked with protecting environmental resources. In the 2000s, neoconservatives popularised the term “Islamofascism” to equate Islam or Islamism with fascism.

== Russo-Ukrainian War ==
During the Euromaidan demonstrations in January 2014, the Slavic Anti-Fascist Front was created in Crimea by Russian member of parliament Aleksey Zhuravlyov and Crimean Russian Unity party leader and future head of the Republic of Crimea Sergey Aksyonov to oppose "fascist uprising" in Ukraine. After the February 2014 Ukrainian revolution, through the annexation of Crimea by the Russian Federation and the outbreak of the war in Donbas, Russian nationalists and state media used the term. They frequently described the Ukrainian government after Euromaidan as fascist or Nazi, at the same time using antisemitic canards, such as accusing them of "Jewish influence", and stating that they were spreading "gay propaganda", a trope of anti-LGBT activism.

In his 21 February speech, which started the events leading to the Russian invasion of Ukraine, Russian President Vladimir Putin falsely accused Ukraine of being governed by Neo-Nazis who persecute the ethnic Russian minority and Russian-speaking Ukrainians. Putin's claims about "de-Nazification" have been widely described as absurd. While Ukraine has a far-right fringe, including the neo-Nazi-linked Azov Battalion and Right Sector, experts have described Putin's rhetoric as greatly exaggerating the influence of far-right groups within Ukraine; there is no widespread support for the ideology in the government, military, or electorate. Russian far-right organizations also exist, such as the Russian Imperial Movement, long active in Donbas. Ukrainian president Zelenskyy, who is Jewish, rebuked Putin's allegations, stating that his grandfather had served in the Soviet army fighting against the Nazis. The United States Holocaust Memorial Museum and Yad Vashem condemned the abuse of Holocaust history and the use of comparisons with Nazi ideology for propaganda.

Several Ukrainian politicians, military leader and members of the Ukrainian civil society have also accused the Russian Federation of being a fascist country. Ukrainian propaganda also compares Vladimir Putin to Adolf Hitler, calling him a "Putler," and Russian troops to the Nazis, calling them a mixture of Russians and fascists, "ruscists".

== Chile ==
In Chile, the insult facho pobre ('poor fascist' or 'low-class fascist') is used against people of perceived working class status with right-leaning views, is the equivalent to class traitor or lumpenproletariat, and it has been the subject of significant analysis, including by figures such as the sociologist Alberto Mayol and political commentator Carlos Peña González. The origin of the insult can possibly be traced back to the massive use in Chile of social networks and their use in political discussions, but was popularized in the aftermath of the 2017 Chilean general election, where right-wing Sebastián Piñera won the presidency with a strong working class voter base. Peña González calls the essence of the insult "the worst of the paternalisms: the belief that ordinary people ... do not know what they want and betray their true interest at the time of choice", while writer Oscar Contardo states that the insult is a sort of "left-wing classism" (Spanish: roteo de izquierda) and implies that "certain ideas can only be defended by the priviledged [sic] class".

In 2019, left-wing deputy and President Gabriel Boric publicly criticized the phrase facho pobre as belonging to an "elitist left", and warned that its use may lead to political isolation.

== Gaza war ==
During the Gaza war, the state of Israel has been called fascist: Nicaragua broke relations with Israel on October 11, 2024, calling the Israeli government "fascist" and "genocidal".

Israeli leaders have also called Palestinian Islamist organization Hamas fascist. Israeli Prime Minister Benjamin Netanyahu called them the "new Nazis". On 27 November 2023, Israel's Finance Minister Bezalel Smotrich said that "there are 2 million Nazis" in the West Bank "who hate us, exactly as do the Nazis of Hamas-ISIS in Gaza". Former Israeli Prime Minister Naftali Bennett also made comparisons between the Nazis and Hamas.

Israeli historian Omer Bartov rebuked the analogy as Holocaust trivialization and weaponization of antisemitism condemning it as a dehumanizing, anti-Palestinian remark as it implies "therefore you don't talk with Nazis, you kill Nazis".

== See also ==
- Chaplinsky v. New Hampshire
- Definitions of fascism
- Godwin's law
- Nazi analogies
- Red-baiting
- Reductio ad Hitlerum
