= Cyber Rights =

1998 book about cyberlaw by Mike Godwin

Cyber Rights: Defending Free Speech in the Digital Age
- 2003 edition
- Author: Mike Godwin
- Original title: Cyber Rights: Defending Free Speech in the Digital Age
- Language: English
- Subject: Cyberlaw
- Genre: Non-fiction
- Publisher: Times Books
- Publication date: 1998
- Publication place: United States
- Media type: Hardback
- Pages: 352
- ISBN: 0-8129-2834-2
- OCLC: 37688296
- Followed by: What Every Citizen Should Know About DRM

Cyber Rights: Defending Free Speech in the Digital Age is a non-fiction book about cyberlaw, written by free speech lawyer Mike Godwin. It was first published in 1998 by Times Books. It was republished in 2003 as a revised edition by The MIT Press. Godwin graduated from the University of Texas School of Law in 1990 and was the first staff counsel for the Electronic Frontier Foundation. Written with a first-person perspective, Cyber Rights offers a background in the legal issues and history pertaining to free speech on the Internet. It documents the author's experiences in defending free speech online, and puts forth the thesis that "the remedy for the abuse of free speech is more speech". Godwin emphasizes that decisions made about the expression of ideas on the Internet affect freedom of speech in other media as well, as granted by the First Amendment to the United States Constitution.

The book was received favorably by Library Journal, where it was "Recommended for anyone concerned about expression on the Internet and democratic society." Publishers Weekly noted Godwin's "unusually broad view of free speech", and criticized the author for viewing issues "filtered through rose-colored screens". The Philadelphia Inquirer highlighted Cyber Rights among "1998's Best Reading".

== Contents ==
Cyber Rights: Defending Free Speech in the Digital Age analyzes the legal issues involved with communicating on the Internet, including those relating to Internet privacy and government involvement. The book is written with a first-person perspective: the reader learns of the author's morning ritual, the fact that his cat is named Francie and that he married a woman he met through a Bulletin Board System. Godwin's motivation was to keep the Internet safe from government actions that restrict freedom of speech. He asserts that the First Amendment to the United States Constitution should apply equally to the Internet as it does to other media.

The book's early chapters ground the reader in principles involving cyberspace and the law. The author provides enough background that a layperson can understand the relevant legal history, including explaining libel and the extent to which copyrighted text may be quoted and used under the fair use principle. Godwin explains his goal is "to show that striking a balance in favor of individual rights has always been the right decision for us and that it remains so even when technology gives us new ways to exercise those rights. Individual liberty has never weakened us; freedom of speech, enhanced by the Net, will only make us stronger". He instructs the reader on how to become proficient in dealing with mainstream news media, writing, "Learn how to hack all the media. Then put that knowledge to good use".

Subsequent chapters consider traditional challenges to broad free speech in the online context, including: defamation, sexual harassment, copyright and issues involving privacy. He dismisses these issues as less important than freedom of speech. Godwin argues that individuals maintain latitude when communicating over the Internet because "it's far more likely that they'll do good than otherwise. This is because freedom of speech is itself a good. The framers of the Constitution were right to give it special protection, because societies in which people can speak freely are better off than societies in which they can't".

The author discusses influential legal cases including a judgment involving Compuserve, where the court ruled that the Internet service provider should be deemed similar to a bookstore avoiding liability for publishing potentially offensive speech. He recounts Steve Jackson Games, Inc. v. United States Secret Service which followed a raid by the United States Secret Service in 1990 on Steve Jackson Games and his involvement influencing the media relating to the incident. He cites the LaMacchia case, which dealt with charges of copyright infringement of software subsequently dismissed. An incident at Santa Rosa Junior College which involved issues of free speech and gender discrimination is discussed and analyzed in the book.

Godwin analyzes the effects of a 1995 cover story "Cyberporn" in Time magazine and writings by Martin Rimm that discussed the effect of Internet pornography. He explains how the theories presented in the article were discredited. Godwin calls the incident following the Time article the "cyber-porn panic"; noting how the magazine published a cover story on a purported pornography "study" and how he and others exposed flaws in the piece.

He cites the Communications Decency Act of 1996 (CDA) as an example of U.S. government action which cramps free speech. Godwin describes the subsequent attempts to defeat CDA. The Supreme Court of the United States held two sections to be unconstitutional and Godwin recounts how he became emotional over the decision. Throughout the book Godwin emphasizes that "the remedy for the abuse of free speech is more speech". Cyber Rights puts forth the notion that "virtual communities" can be fostered on the Internet that serve the values of democracy, writing "The decisions we make about the Internet don't affect just the Internet – they are answers to basic questions about the relationship each citizen has to the government and about the extent to which we trust one another with the full range of fundamental rights granted by the Constitution".

== Reception ==
Cyber Rights: Defending Free Speech in the Digital Age was reviewed favorably in Library Journal, where it was described as "a provocative discussion of the social and legal issues concerning computer online communications". Booklist observed, "He wants us to understand that the principles upon which this country is founded are unquestionably worth the risk. He passionately defends, in clear, one-two-three soundbites, the online freedom he wants his daughter to inherit, and he insists that his readers untangle the meanings behind the use of words such as indecency and pornography to frighten and to confuse."

Cyber Rights: Defending Free Speech in the Digital Age also received a positive review in Salon, the Columbia Journalism Review, and the School Library Journal.

The New York Times Book Review was critical of Godwin's writing style in the book, and observed, "He writes in a strong, piercing voice that probably does wonders in a courtroom, but comes off increasingly shrill over several hundred pages of commentary, and at one point fairly warns his reader, 'Subtlety isn't my strong point.'" The Journal of Information Ethics wrote, "This is less an analytic study than a personal survey of situations or occurrences articulated in an informal, colloquial, and anecdotal fashion. It is not aimed at the intelligentsia or legal profession, although members of these groups would certainly benefit from the details."

== See also ==
- Godwin's law

Books

- Code and Other Laws of Cyberspace
- The Hacker Crackdown
- Internet and Technology Law Desk Reference
- Small Pieces Loosely Joined
- Who Controls the Internet?

Law centers

- Berkman Center for Internet and Society at Harvard Law School
- Norwegian Research Center for Computers and Law
- Stanford Center for Internet and Society, at Stanford Law School
