= Red-baiting =

Method of discrediting opponent's argument

Red-baiting, also known as reductio ad Stalinum (/ˈstɑːlɪnəm/; Latin for 'reduction to Stalin') and red-tagging (in the Philippines), is the act of attempting to discredit the validity of a political opponent and the opponent's logical argument by accusing, denouncing, attacking, or persecuting the target individual or group as anarchist, communist, Marxist, socialist, Stalinist, or fellow travelers towards these ideologies. In the phrase, red refers to the color that traditionally symbolized left-wing politics worldwide since the 19th century, while baiting refers to persecution, torment, or harassment, as in baiting.

Communist and associates, or more broadly socialist, have been used as a pejorative epithet against a wide range of individuals, political movements, governments, public, and private institutions since the emergence of the communist movement and the wider socialist movement. In the 19th century, the ruling classes were afraid of socialism because it challenged their rule. Since then, socialism has faced opposition, which was often organized and violent. During the 20th century, as socialism became a mainstream movement and communism gained power through communist parties, their main opponents were the political right, alongside organized anti-communists and critics of socialism. The United States is a notable exception among the Western world in not having had a major socialist party, and for having engaged in red-baiting, resulting in two historic Red Scare periods during the 1920s (First Red Scare) and 1950s (Second Red Scare). Such usage as an insult has been used as a tactic by the Republican Party against Democratic Party candidates, and has continued into the 21st century, including by conflating socialism with Nazism.

In the United States, the term red-baiting dates to as far back as 1927. In 1928, blacklisting by the Daughters of the American Revolution was characterized as a "red-baiting relic". A term commonly used in the United States, red-baiting in American history is most famously associated with McCarthyism, which originated in the two historic Red Scare periods. While red-baiting does not have quite the same effect it previously did due to the Revolutions of 1989, some pundits posit that notable events in 21st-century American politics indicate a resurgence of red-baiting consistent with the Cold War era. Other have noted parallels between red-baiting and attacks on other contemporary left-wing dissenters, such as pro-Palestinian students.

== Background ==
Both communist and socialist movements have faced hostility since their breakthrough in the 19th century. Friedrich Engels stated that in 1848, at the time when The Communist Manifesto was first published, socialism was respectable, while communism was not. The Owenites in England and the Fourierists in France were considered respectable socialists, while working-class movements that proclaimed the necessity of radical change denoted themselves communists; this latter branch of socialism produced the communist work of Étienne Cabet in France and Wilhelm Weitling in Germany. While democrat liberals looked to the Revolutions of 1848 as a democratic revolution, which in the long run ensured liberty, equality, and fraternity, communists denounced 1848 as a betrayal of working-class ideals by a bourgeoisie indifferent to the legitimate demands of the proletariat.

In countries such as 19th-century Germany and Italy, socialist parties have been banned, like with Otto von Bismarck's Anti-Socialist Laws. In the 1950s, West Germany and the United States banned the major communist party, the Communist Party of Germany and the Communist Party USA, respectively. (Note: The former's decision was upheld in a landmark case establishing limits on freedom of expression or speech by the European Commission of Human Rights in Communist Party of Germany v. the Federal Republic of Germany, while the latter was applied through the Communist Control Act of 1954, which remains standing even though it has not been enforced, apart from two minor cases in the states of New Jersey and New York.) With the expansion of liberal democracy and universal suffrage during the 20th century, socialism became a mainstream movement which expanded for most of the world, as center-left and left-wing socialist parties came to govern, become the main opposition party, or simply a commonality of the democratic process in most of the Western world; one major exception was the United States. In the Eastern world, communist parties came to power through revolution, civil war, coup d'état, and other means, coming to cover one-third of the world population by 1985, while in Western Europe communist parties were part of several post-war coalitions, before being ejected on the United States' orders, such as in Italy. Those parties in the West continued to be an important part of the multi-party democracy process; those in the East became an oppressive driving force for most of the 20th century due to the Soviet Union's role in World War II as part of the Allied powers against the fascist-led Axis powers, and later in the Cold War. In Western Europe Socialist parties greatly contributed to existing liberal democracy.

== History ==
=== Australia ===
In the early 1950s, Liberal Party leaders like Robert Menzies red-baited Labor politicians and described them as insufficiently tough on the People's Republic of China.

=== Peru ===
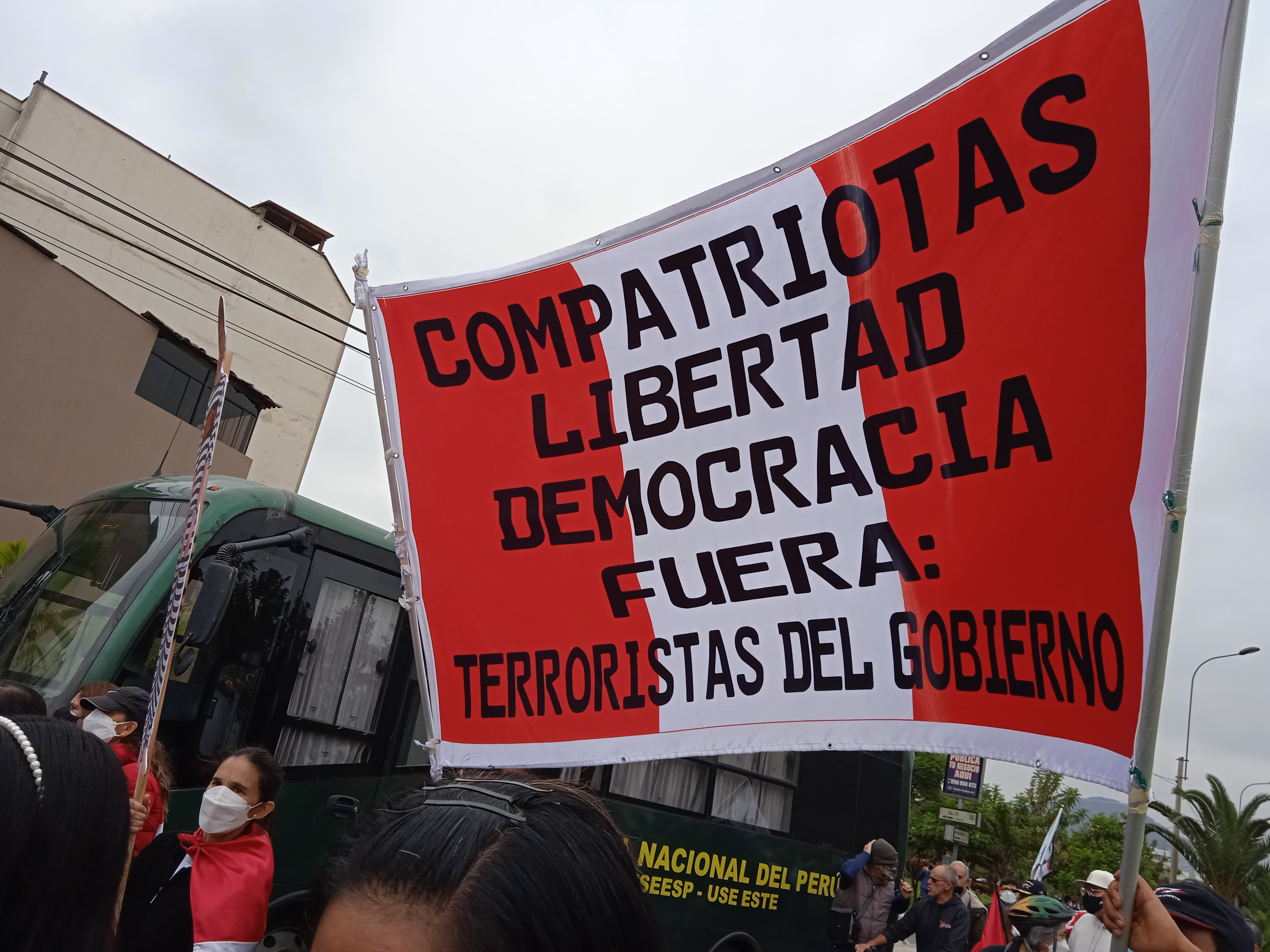
Protest sign against the administration of Peruvian president Pedro Castillo, stating "Get out: Terrorists of the government" (2022)

Since the 1930s, the political elite of Peru have used fearmongering tactics to influence the public by targeting foreign communist movements according to historian Antonio Zapata of the Pontifical Catholic University of Peru, beginning with Joseph Stalin and later with Fidel Castro. Terruqueos began to appear during the 1980s and would occur throughout the internal conflict in Peru. The basis of the terruqueo began during the presidency of Fernando Belaúnde when Legislative Decree 46 broadly defined terrorism as "any form of glorification or defense of the political discourse of subversive organizations". Into the 1990s, authoritarian president Alberto Fujimori utilized terruqueos with the help of the National Intelligence Service to discredit those who opposed him, including dissenters from his own government, with political scientist Daniel Encinas saying that this would evolve into conservative politicians using the attack to target those opposed to Fujimori's neoliberal economic policies and that the right-wing used the terruqueo as a "strategy of manipulating the legacy of political violence". Ultimately, a culture of fear was created by Fujimori according to Jo-Marie Burt, with individuals fearing that they would be described as a terrorist.

The terruqueo would then become so prominent that political discussions in Peru often devolved into the attacks, especially during elections. According to Fernando Velásquez Villalba, terruqueos are a latent phenomenon that appear more frequently in times of crisis. Terruqueos were intense against Pedro Castillo; he was portrayed as a "communist threat" that would bring "terrorism" and humanitarian disaster similar to Venezuela. When the 2022–2023 Peruvian political protests occurred, right-wing groups and the government of Dina Boluarte used the terruqueo to label protesters as terrorists, providing an excuse for authorities to use violence with impunity. Experts of the United Nations condemned its usage during the protests.

=== Philippines ===
In the Philippines, red-tagging poses threats to the lives or safety of its targets and impinges on the right to free expression and dissent. Red-tagged individuals also tend to become vulnerable to death threats and allegations of terrorism. The United Nations warns that red-tagging is a "criminalizing discourse" that undermines the value of the work of human rights defenders and places them at risk of violence and various forms of harassment.

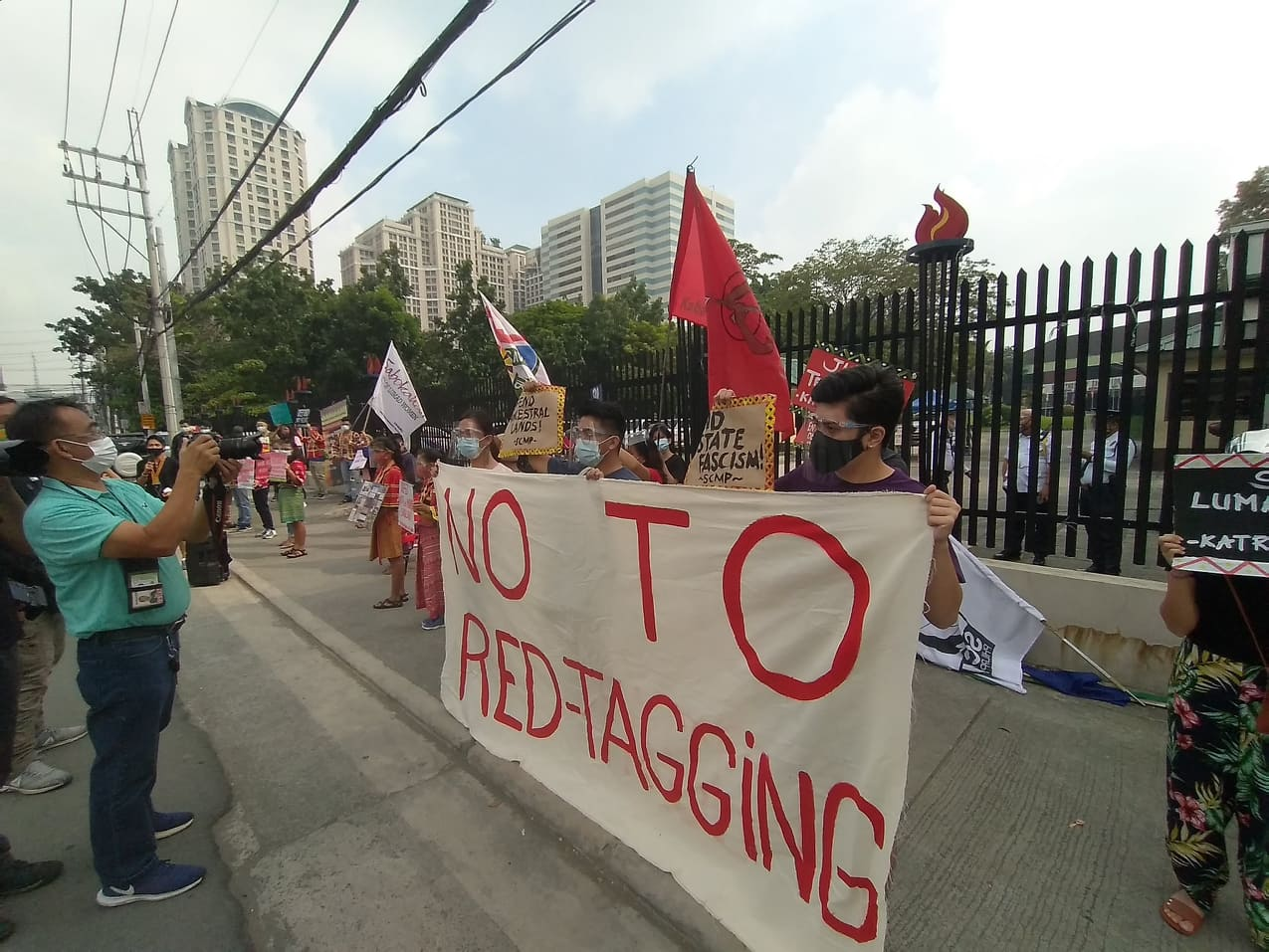
An anti-redtagging banner in a protest against the closure of Lumad schools in the Philippines, December 2020

Communism has generally been viewed with disfavor and particular distrust by large sectors of Philippine society ever since the country gained independence from the United States on 4 July 1946 through the Treaty of Manila. Shared ideological preferences with the United States, resulting from more than four decades of benevolent assimilation and exacerbated by the onset of the Cold War, have resulted in some Filipinos being predisposed to suspicion of communist sympathies. This predisposition makes red-tagging an effective fear appeal tool used by players in the political arena, given that it authorizes law-enforcement agencies and the military to act on the taggings.

Red-tagging is almost never employed in foreign relations of the Philippines, including members of ruling communist parties, owing to the principle in international law of Westphalian sovereignty in another country's domestic affairs. This can be seen especially in the government's cordial relations with the Lao People's Revolutionary Party and the Communist Party of Vietnam, both of which are ruling parties of ASEAN member states. (Note: Given the long and traumatic experience of European colonisation of Southeast Asia, ASEAN strongly upholds the principle of noninterference.) One of the notable exceptions to the nontagging of foreigners was United States citizen Brandon Lee, an ancestral-domain paralegal in the Cordillera Administrative Region. Lee was tagged as a communist and automatically an "enemy of the state" and was subsequently shot four times.

=== United States ===
==== 20th century ====
Red-baiting was employed in opposition to anarchists in the United States as early as the late 1870s when businessmen, religious leaders, politicians and editorial writers tried to rally poor and middle-class workers to oppose dissident railroad workers and again during the Haymarket affair in the mid-1880s. Red-baiting was well established in the United States during the decade before World War I. In the post-war period of 1919–1921, the United States government employed it as a central tactic in dealing with labor radicals, anarchists, communists, socialists, and foreign agents. These actions in reaction to the First Red Scare and the concurrent Red Terror served as part of the organizing principle shaping counter-revolutionary policies and serving to institutionalize anti-communism as a force in American politics.

The period between the first and second Red Scares was relatively calm owing to the success of government anti-communism, the suppressive effects of New Deal policies on radical organized labor and the patriotism associated with total mobilization and war effort during World War II. Red-baiting re-emerged in the late 1940s and early 1950s during the period known as the Second Red Scare due to mounting Cold War tensions and the spread of communism abroad. Senator Joseph McCarthy's controversial red-baiting of suspected communists and communist sympathizers in the United States Department of State and the creation of a Hollywood blacklist led to the term McCarthyism being coined to signify any type of reckless political persecution or witch-hunt.

The history of anti-communist red-baiting in general and McCarthyism in particular continues to be hotly debated and political divisions this controversy created continue to make themselves felt. Conservative critics contend that revelations such as the Venona project decryptions and the FBI Silvermaster File at least mute if not outright refute the charge that red-baiting in general was unjustified. Historian Nicholas von Hoffman wrote in The Washington Post that evidence revealed in the Venona project forced him to admit that McCarthy was "still closer to the truth than those who ridiculed him" but has continued to believe that McCarthy did not identify the correct people. A similar view was expressed by Senator Daniel Patrick Moynihan, who led the Moynihan Commission on Government Secrecy declassifying the Venona decryptions. Liberal scholars contend that even if someone could prove that the United States government was infiltrated by Soviet spies, McCarthy was censured by the Senate because he was in fact reckless and politically opportunistic, and his red-baiting ruined the lives of countless innocent people. In 1950, United States president Harry S. Truman had called McCarthy "the greatest asset the Kremlin has." Historian Ellen Schrecker wrote that "McCarthyism did more damage to the constitution than the American Communist Party ever did".

==== 21st century ====
Although red-baiting in the United States does not have quite the same effect it previously did due to the fall of most Marxist–Leninist governments in the 1990s, some pundits posit that events in 21st-century American politics indicates a resurgence of red-baiting consistent with the 1950s. The United States government's measures in 2008 to address the subprime mortgage crisis such as the Troubled Asset Relief Program were not only criticized as corporate welfare but red-baited as a "gateway to socialism". Political activist and author Tim Wise says that the emergence of such red-baiting may have been motivated by, and given additional force by, racism towards President Barack Obama and fear that the progressive policies of his administration would erode white privilege in the United States.

Some commentators posit that red-baiting was used by John McCain, Republican presidential nominee in the 2008 United States presidential election, when he commented that Obama's improvised comments on wealth redistribution to Joe the Plumber was a promotion of socialism. Journalist David Remnick, who wrote the biography The Bridge: The Life and Rise of Barack Obama, countered that it should be obvious that after one year in office Obama is a center-left president and the majority of his policies are in line with the center-left Democratic tradition. In July 2011, The Fiscal Times columnist Bruce Barlett wrote that an honest examination of the Obama presidency must conclude that he has in fact been a moderately conservative Democrat, and that it may take twenty years before Obama's basic conservatism is widely accepted. Author and columnist Chris Hedges posits that the Obama administration's policies have been mostly right-wing.

In April 2009, Representative Spencer Bachus made the claim that seventeen of his Congressional colleagues were socialists but could only name Senator Bernie Sanders, who has been openly describing himself as a democratic socialist for years. Sanders countered that American conservatives blur the differences between democratic socialism and authoritarian socialism, and between democracy and totalitarianism. For Sanders, the United States would benefit from a serious debate about comparing the quality of life for the middle class in the United States and in Nordic countries with a long social-democratic tradition.

In May 2009, a number of conservative members of the Republican National Committee were pressing the committee and by extension chairman Michael Steele to officially adopt the position that the Democratic Party is socialist. Over a dozen members of the conservative wing of the committee submitted a new resolution, to be eventually voted on by the entire committee, that would call on the Democratic Party to rename itself the Democrat Socialist Party; had this resolution been adopted, the committee's official view would have been that Democrats are socialists. On 20 May 2009, supporters of the resolution agreed to accept language urging Democrats to "stop pushing our country towards socialism and government control", ending a fight within the ranks of the Republican Party that reflected the divide between those who want a more centrist message and those seeking a more aggressive, conservative voice such as the one expressed by the Tea Party movement. Frank Llewellyn, the national director of Democratic Socialists of America, commented that Republicans never really define what they mean by socialism, and are simply engaging in the politics of fear.

In July 2009, talk show host Glenn Beck began to devote what would become many episodes on his TV and radio shows, focusing on Van Jones, a special advisor in President Obama's White House Council on Environmental Quality. Beck was especially critical of Jones' previous involvement in radical protest movements and referred to him as a "communist-anarchist radical". In September 2009, Jones resigned his position in the Obama administration after a number of his past statements became fodder for conservative critics and Republican officials. Time credited Beck with leading conservatives' attack on Jones, who characterized it as a "vicious smear campaign" and an effort to use "lies and distortions to distract and divide".

On March 5, 2020, an article was published by the New York Times about Bernie Sanders and his endeavors during his time as the mayor of Burlington, Vermont. The article mainly focused on his efforts to establish a sister-city relationship with the city of Yaroslavl of the Soviet Union in 1987–88. The Times opened with a direct quotation from a letter Sanders sent to Yaroslavl, showcasing Sanders' desire to bring the United States and Soviet Union closer to peaceful relations. The Times continued with "Unbeknownst to him," the Soviets intended "to exploit Mr. Sanders's anti-war agenda for their own propaganda purposes." The Times presented 89 new files consisting of "letters, telegrams, and internal Soviet government documents" to back their claims. The controversy arose from the Times' presentation and interpretation of these files, potentially intending to paint Sanders with communist political leanings. Jack F. Matlock Jr., The United States ambassador for the Soviet Union from 1987 to 1991, personally wrote the editor a letter upon reading the article, claiming it to be a "distortion of history." Matlock claimed the sister-city relationship Sanders developed was actively encouraged by the United States government, further insinuating the article to be an instance of Red-Baiting.

== Insult usage ==
Communist or socialist have been used as a pejorative within red-baiting, mainly in reference to authoritarian state socialist regimes and Communist states but also for any proposal that may further expand the role of the government, by anti-communists and the political right for both communists and socialists, and for those who are neither but are alleged to be adopting socialist policies, as is done by Republicans for Democratic candidates in the United States. Those terms have also been used as an insult for several left-wing politicians in center-left socialist parties to describe them as farthest left and more extreme than they actually are in an effort to marginalize them. (Note: Those politicians disagree with the politics of triangulation and the Third Way politics adopted by their own parties like through New Labour, such as by moving to the right in an attempt to regain political power and seeing a return to laissez-faire capitalism as a more pressing immediate concern; they are generally opposed to neoliberalism, or reject the Washington Consensus, and advocate a return along the lines of the social-liberal paradigm of the post-war consensus and the Golden Age of Capitalism, where Keynesian economics formed the base, and there was more economic interventionism and nationalization policies, in contrast to the deregulation and privatization of the neoliberal era. Those who left their center-left parties to found parties to their left are categorized by political scientist as Left parties within familles spirituelles, and as left-wing populist parties.) For some scholars, communist and socialist, and the memories of such authoritarian regimes, are used as an insult to dismiss any criticism of capitalism and support for socialism by positing that any form of communism or socialism would always and inevitably result in 20th-century Communism and authoritarian regimes.

=== Germany ===
The 1994 federal election saw a "red socks" campaign used by the center-right, including the CDU/CSU and the Free Democratic Party (FDP), to scare off a possible red–red–green coalition alliance (SPD–PDS–The Greens). Analysts have stated that such a strategy likely paid off, as it was seen as one of the decisive elements for the narrow victory of Helmut Kohl for the CDU/CSU–FDP. The red-baiting campaign was criticized as an obvious attempt to discredit the whole left; the PDS reinterpreted it for itself by printing red socks.

As the CDU/CSU was falling down while the SPD was surging in the polls, the 2021 federal election saw a Red Scare campaign against a possible red–red–green federal government, which was feared by conservatives, who engaged in red-baiting by promoting a Red Scare. A capital flight to Switzerland ensued due to fear of increased taxes for the very rich through higher inheritance taxes and a wealth tax. As The Left underperformed, a left-wing coalition was ruled out by just a few seats in the Bundestag, and the German financial market rallied as a result, as such threat was eliminated.

=== United Kingdom ===
In the United Kingdom, former Labour Party leader Jeremy Corbyn was often labelled a communist or Marxist, and a communist spy by commentators in mainstream national newspapers The Daily Mail, The Sun, The Telegraph, and The Times, despite experts and researchers stating that no evidence exists. During the 2017 general election campaign, Stephen Bush and George Eaton of the New Statesman commented that the Labour Party's manifesto was more Keynesian than anything, with Eaton stating that the adopted policies "would be regarded as mainstream in most European countries". According to some studies, media coverage of Corbyn has often been hostile and misrepresentative of his views.

=== United States ===
During the 20th century, the United States underwent two Red Scares, first in the late 1910s/early 1920s and then in the 1950s through McCarthyism. In a speech on 10 October 1952, (Note: Notable excerpts include: [Republican Senator Robert] Taft explained that the great issue in this campaign is "creeping socialism." Now that is the patented trademark of the special interest lobbies. Socialism is a scare word they have hurled at every advance the people have made in the last 20 years. Socialism is what they called public power. Socialism is what they called social security. Socialism is what they called farm price supports. Socialism is what they called bank deposit insurance. Socialism is what they called the growth of free and independent labor organizations. Socialism is their name for almost anything that helps all the people. When the Republican candidate inscribes the slogan "Down With Socialism" on the banner of his "great crusade," that is really not what he means at all. What he really means is, "Down with Progress—down with Franklin Roosevelt's New Deal," and "down with Harry Truman's fair Deal." That is what he means.) outgoing United States president Harry S. Truman (Democratic Party) lambasted Republicans for having "opposed almost all our programs to help the economic life of the country" and "having blindly turned [their] back on the tradition of public action for the public good", referencing then-Republican United States senator Robert A. Taft, who made the 1952 United States presidential election campaign about "creepy socialism", a scare word "they have hurled at every advance the people have made in the last 20 years" according to Truman. Socialism and socialization have been mistakenly used to refer to any state or government-operated industry or service (the proper term for such being either municipalization or nationalization); both terms have also been incorrectly used to mean any tax-funded programs, whether government-run or privately run.

Into the 21st century, with the rise in popularity and to the mainstream of self-declared democratic socialist United States senator Bernie Sanders, socialist has continued to be used as an insult, mainly by conservatives. Among conservatives, socialist is used as an insult to imply that Nazism, and by extension fascism, was a left-wing ideology, which is contrary to the consensus among scholars of fascism as a far-right ideology. An example of this is conservative columnist Jonah Goldberg's book Liberal Fascism, where modern liberalism and progressivism are described as the child of fascism, which is considered to be socialist. For conservative figures such as Dinesh D'Souza and Candace Owens, American Left figures like Alexandria Ocasio-Cortez, Sanders, and Elizabeth Warren are not only socialists but since the Nazis are wrongly considered to be socialists in this view, they are dangerous, and in turn any who oppose them cannot have any link to Nazism or the far right. The use of socialist as an insult to falsely imply that the Nazis were leftists is seen as a way to disavow far-right history, erase leftist victims of Nazi violence, and justify violence against leftists. Monopoly Socialism, a version of the Monopoly board game by Hasbro, was criticized for confusing socialism with communism, and mocking left-wing ideas in general. Some noted that the original game was created as a satire of capitalism, though by Georgists who were also critical of socialism, which is not widely known nowadays.

== See also ==
- Ad hominem
- Crypto-communism
- Cultural Marxism
- Fascist (insult)
- PROFUNC
- Reductio ad Hitlerum
- Redwashing
