= Winners Don't Use Drugs =

American anti-drug slogan

Screenshot of the slogan

"Winners Don't Use Drugs" is an anti-drug slogan that was included in arcade games imported by the American Amusement Machine Association (AAMA) into North America from 1989 to 2000. The slogan appeared during an arcade game's attract mode. The messages are credited to FBI Director William S. Sessions, whose name appears alongside the slogan. Sessions was dismissed from the FBI in July 1993. After 1993, the slogan was attributed to "FBI Director" (instead of naming his successor Louis Freeh) until the campaign was phased out in 2000. However, the phrase would be less commonly used in arcade games by 1995, and was afterwards only released in, at best, one new arcade game per year before 2000.

== History ==
The slogan was part of a long-term effort by the United States in its war on drugs started by President Richard Nixon in 1971. Part of this campaign was to publicize the message about the harm of drugs to the youth, with the FBI focusing on how to use public messaging to spread this message out widely. William S. Sessions, who became FBI Director in 1987, established the FBI's Drug Awareness Program to get these messages to reach the youth and teenagers. Sessions announced the "Winners Don't Use Drugs" program at a press event on January 10, 1989, in cooperation with the American Amusement Machine Association (AAMA), who agreed to require arcade video games to include the slogan message while in attract mode. The games Double Dragon, John Elway's Quarterback, and Tecmo Bowl were used on stage as examples for how the message would appear on the screen. AAMA executive vice president Robert Fay announced that of the 20 video game manufacturers, 17 agreed to include the message in their software for all new machines. At the time of the announcement, it had already been installed in 10,000 current machines with a prediction of reaching 100,000 of approximately 750,000 active machines by the end of 1989.

In 1989, Bob Davenport, the director of the FBI's Office of Public Affairs, was tasked by Sessions to get anti-drug public service announcements towards children. Various ideas were tried but without success. While at a dinner meeting with former FBI agent and Davenport's acquaintance Robert Fay, by then the president of the AAMA, the subject of this PSA came up. Fay's former role in the FBI had been part of a white collar crime unit who had led the investigation into a counterfeit video game ring, which led to Fay's transition to the AAMA. Fay had sway over the various companies in the AAMA due to having helped stop this counterfeit ring, and thus was able to get the AAMA to agree to include the message, once it was decided. Sessions, Davenport and Fay worked through several iterations of the slogan, eventually coming to "Winners Don't Use Drugs" as a short, uplifting message that not only applied to video games but other facets of life. The slogan was accompanied by the FBI's seal, which later helped to identify counterfeit arcade games for lacking the message, the seal, or an incorrect version of it.

The slogan was used through the 1990s, with Sessions' name replaced by simply "FBI Director" following Sessions' departure from office. The shift from George H. W. Bush to Bill Clinton as U.S. President also saw a dramatic shift in the desire to maintain the same national anti-drug strategy, opting to instead have less federal-based enforcement and more enforcement based on state and local laws. The "Winners Don't Use Drugs" slogan would lose influence by 1995, when it was only used in two arcade games, and would be only be used for one arcade game released in the years 1996, 1997 and 1999. By about 2000, the use of the slogan in arcade games waned, as the arcade market was waning, while the intensity of focus on the war on drugs fell.

A similar campaign called Recycle It, Don't Trash It! credited to then-EPA Administrator William K. Reilly was launched several years afterward.

== In popular culture ==
The slogan has been parodied in other games and media. In the 2010 video game Scott Pilgrim vs. the World: The Game, it contains a parody with a slogan saying "Winners Don't Eat Meat" in reference to vegan Todd Ingram, and in Futurama with the version "Winners don't play video games".

== See also ==
- "Just Say No"
- Seal of the FBI
