= Mike Godwin =

American attorney and author (born 1956)

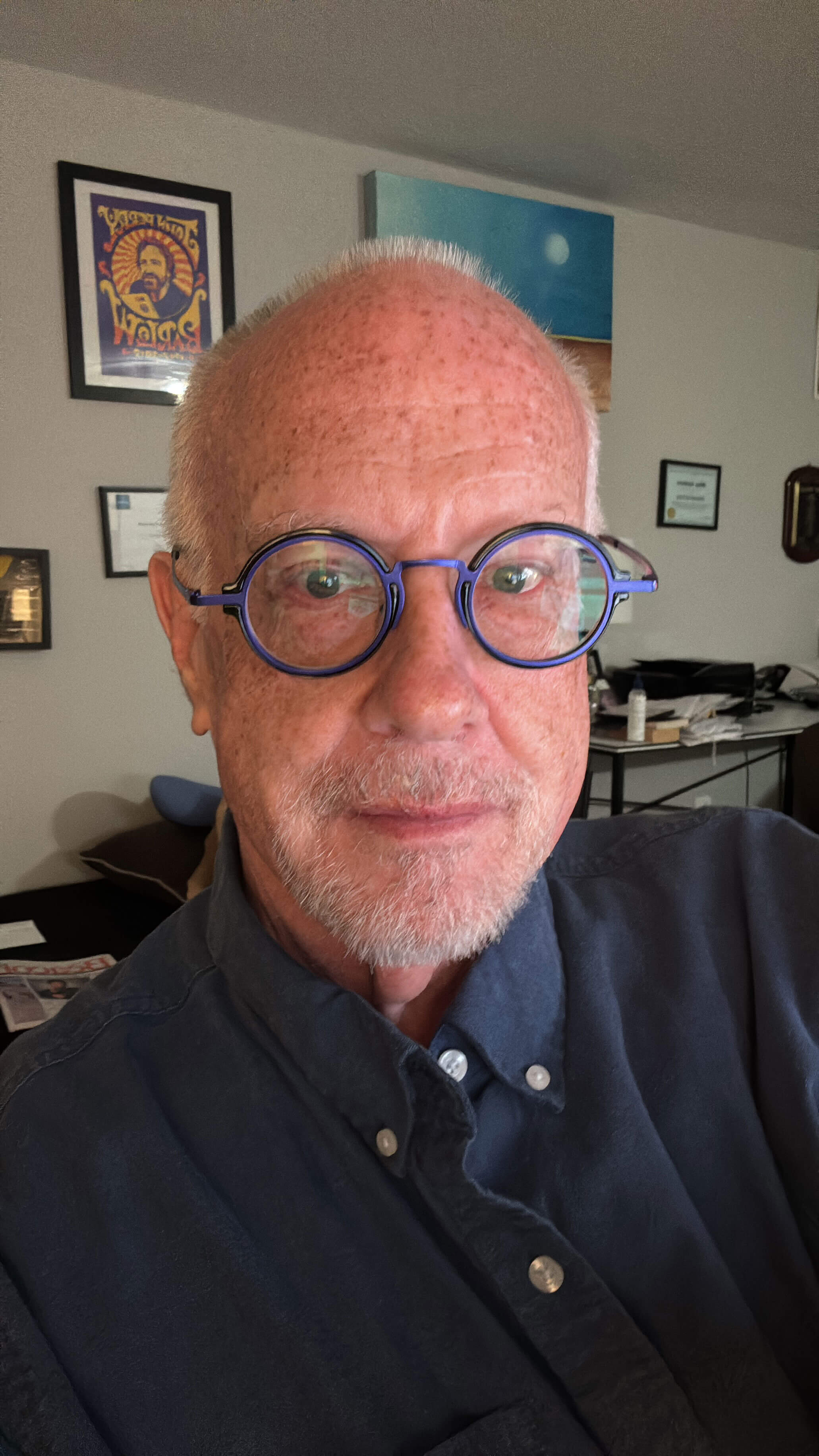
- Godwin in 2025
- Born: Michael Wayne Godwin; Houston, Texas, U.S.
- Education: University of Texas, Austin (BA, JD)
- Known for: Godwin's law

Michael Wayne Godwin is an American attorney and author. He was the first staff counsel of the Electronic Frontier Foundation (EFF), and he created the Internet adage Godwin's law and the notion of an Internet meme. From July 2007 to October 2010, he was general counsel for the Wikimedia Foundation. In March 2011, he was elected to the Open Source Initiative board. Godwin has been a contributing editor of Reason magazine since 1994. In April 2019, he was elected to the Internet Society board. From 2015 to 2020, he was general counsel and director of innovation policy at the R Street Institute. In August 2020, he and the Blackstone Law Group filed a lawsuit against the Trump administration on behalf of the employees of TikTok, where he went on to work from June 2021 until June 2022. Since October 2022, he has worked as the policy and privacy lead at Anonym, a "privacy-safe advertising" startup.

== Early life and education ==
Godwin attended Lamar High School in Houston, and graduated in 1980 from the University of Texas at Austin with a Bachelor of Arts degree in the Plan II Honors program. Godwin later attended the University of Texas School of Law, graduating with a Juris Doctor degree in 1990. While in law school, Godwin was the editor of The Daily Texan, the student newspaper, from 1988 to 1989.

In early 1990 in his last semester of law school Godwin, who knew Steve Jackson through the Austin bulletin board system community, helped publicize the Secret Service raid on Steve Jackson Games. His involvement is later documented in the non-fiction book The Hacker Crackdown: Law and Disorder on the Electronic Frontier (1992) by Bruce Sterling.

== Career ==
Godwin's early involvement in the Steve Jackson Games affair led to his being hired by the Electronic Frontier Foundation (EFF) in November 1990, when the organization was new. Shortly afterwards, as the first EFF in-house lawyer, he supervised its sponsorship of the Steve Jackson Games, Inc. v. United States Secret Service case. Steve Jackson Games won the case in 1993.

As a lawyer for EFF, Godwin was one of the counsel of record for the plaintiffs in the case challenging the Communications Decency Act in 1996. The Supreme Court decided the case for the plaintiffs on First Amendment grounds in 1997 in Reno v. American Civil Liberties Union. Godwin's work on this and other First Amendment cases in the 1990s is documented in his book Cyber Rights: Defending Free Speech in the Digital Age (1998), which was reissued in a revised, expanded edition by MIT Press in 2003.

Godwin has also been a staff attorney and policy fellow for the Center for Democracy and Technology; a chief correspondent at IP Worldwide, a publication of American Lawyer Media; and a columnist for The American Lawyer magazine. He is a contributing editor at Reason magazine, where he has published interviews of several science-fiction writers.

From 2003 to 2005, Godwin was staff attorney and later legal director of Public Knowledge, a non-governmental organization based in Washington, D.C., concerned with intellectual property law. Godwin has worked on copyright and technology policy, including the relationship between digital rights management and American copyright law. While at Public Knowledge, he supervised litigation that successfully challenged the Federal Communications Commission's broadcast flag regulation that would have imposed DRM restrictions on television.

From October 2005 to April 2007, Godwin was a research fellow at Yale University, holding dual positions in the Information Society Project (ISP) at Yale Law School, and at the Yale Computer Science Department's Privacy, Obligations and Rights in Technologies of Information Assessment (PORTIA) project.

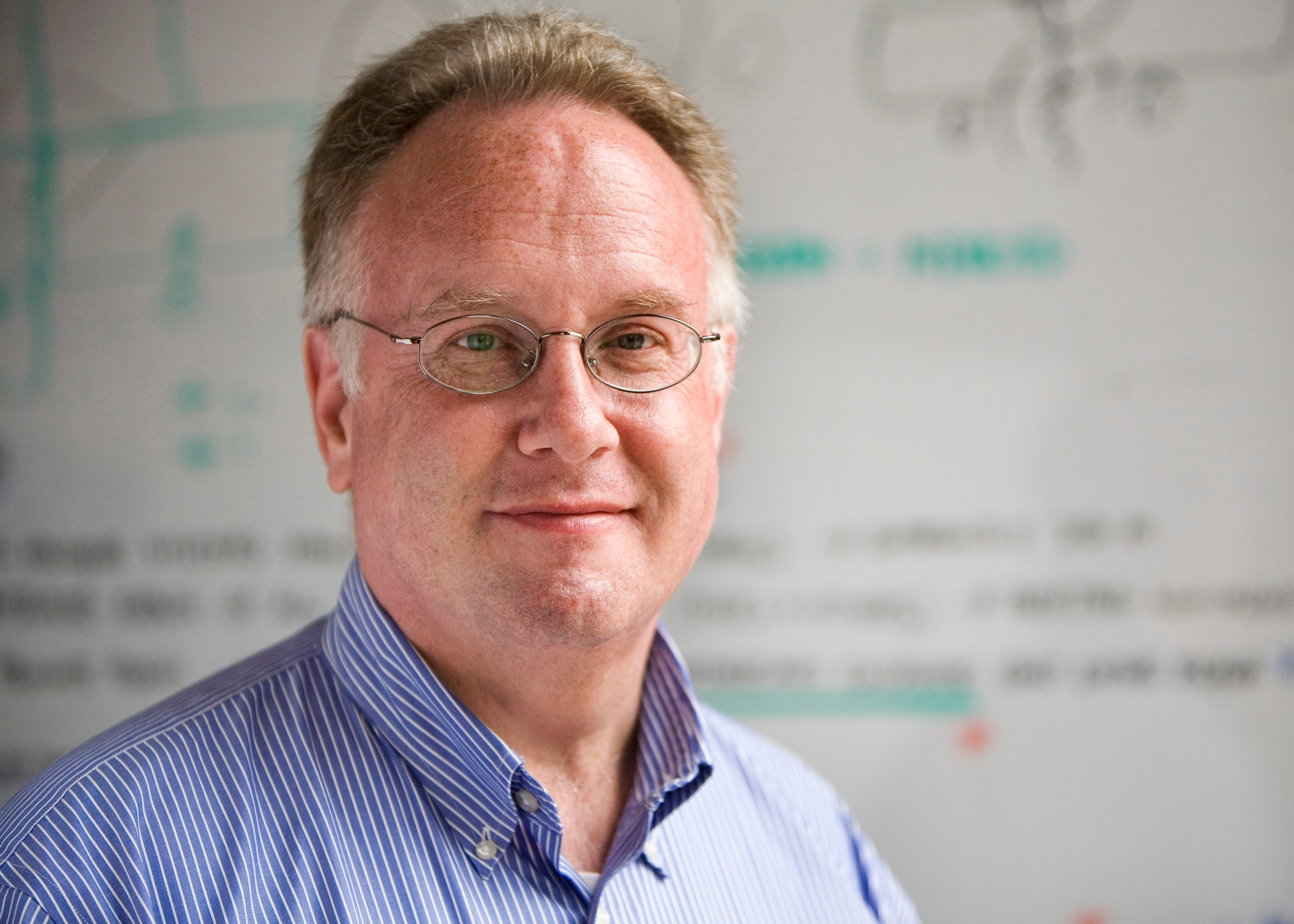
Staff photograph of Godwin (age 51; June 2008)

Godwin was general counsel for the Wikimedia Foundation from July 3, 2007, until October 22, 2010. Commenting on the self-correcting nature of Wikipedia in an interview with The New York Times in which he said that he had corrected his own Wikipedia article, Godwin said: "The best answer for bad speech is more speech." When the Federal Bureau of Investigation demanded in July 2010 that its seal be removed from Wikipedia, Godwin sent a "whimsically written letter" in response, denying the demand and describing the FBI's interpretation of the law as "idiosyncratic ... and, more importantly, incorrect."

Godwin has been a proponent of net neutrality since 2006, along with other internet advocates such as Vint Cerf. When the Wikimedia Foundation agreed with major telecommunications providers to create Wikipedia Zero, an application that violated the principles of net neutrality, Godwin believed that the benefits of the program outweighed its negatives. Wikipedia Zero was discontinued in 2018.

Godwin was named a member of the Student Press Law Center Board of Directors in January 2009, of the Open Source Initiative Board of Directors in March 2011, and the Internet Society Board of Trustees in April 2019.

In January 2020, Godwin and the rest of the Internet Society board attempted to sell the .org TLD to private equity.

In August 2020, he and the Blackstone Law Group filed a lawsuit against the Trump administration on behalf of the employees of the media company TikTok. In June 2021, Godwin took a role as director in trust & safety at TikTok. In October 2022, he began working at Anonym as the trust and safety lead.

== Popular culture ==
=== Character in The Difference Engine ===
The character "Michael Godwin" in the 1990 book The Difference Engine by Bruce Sterling and William Gibson was named after Godwin as thanks for his technical assistance in linking their computers to allow them to collaborate between Austin and Vancouver.

=== Godwin's law ===
Godwin originated Godwin's law in 1990, stating:

As an online discussion grows longer, the probability of a comparison involving Nazis or Hitler approaches 1.

Godwin believes the ubiquity of such comparisons trivializes the Holocaust, which he finds regrettable. He has since made it clear that, in his opinion, the alt-right, especially the participants in the 2017 Charlottesville Unite the Right rally, deserve comparisons to the Nazis. He has also stated in the press several times, from 2015 to 2023, that informed comparison of U.S. president Donald Trump to Hitler could be valid.

== Personal life ==
In 2017, Godwin married hotel leasing manager Sienghom "Jessy" Ches. According to Politico, he was in Cambodia in 2015 to help activists draft an "internet Bill of Rights", and they met in the business center of the hotel where she worked.

== Bibliography ==
- Ludlow, Peter, ed. (1996). "Introduction". High Noon on the Electronic Frontier: Conceptual Issues in Cyberspace. MIT Press. ISBN 0262621037.
- Cyber Rights: Defending Free speech in the Digital Age. Times Books. 1998. ISBN 0812928342.
- The Splinters of our Discontent: How to Fix Social Media and Democracy Without Breaking Them. Zenger Press. 2019. ISBN 9781939888754.

== See also ==
- List of Wikipedia people
