= Symbols of the Federal Bureau of Investigation =

Official symbols of the U.S. federal agency

Seal of the Federal Bureau of Investigation
- Armiger: Federal Bureau of Investigation
- Adopted: January 1, 1941
- Shield: Set of scales, five alternating red and white vertical bands
- Motto: Fidelity, Bravery, Integrity
- Use: To represent the organization and to authenticate certain documents

Federal Bureau of Investigation
- Use: Other
- Proportion: 3:5
- Design: The seal of the Federal Bureau of Investigation set against a blue background.
- Designed by: Federal Bureau of Investigation

This article details the official symbols in use by the Federal Bureau of Investigation (FBI), the domestic intelligence and security service of the United States.

The Seal of the Federal Bureau of Investigation is the symbol of the FBI. It is used by the FBI to represent the organization and to authenticate certain documents that it issues. The term is used both for the physical seal itself, and more generally for the design impressed upon it. The seal has also been used as part of the flag of the FBI.

The current version of the seal has been in use since 1941. Designed in 1940 by FBI Special Agent Leo Gauthier, it derives its design from the FBI's flag and symbolizes the values, standards and history of the Bureau through the various elements incorporated in the design. It should not be confused with the FBI badge, which is older and has a different design.

These symbols show how people can identify the Federal Bureau of Investigation.

== Design ==
The colors and symbol of the seal of the FBI represent the values and standards of the FBI and the United States and allude to the history of both the organization and the country. The center of the seal depicts a shield bracketed by two laurel branches, with an inscribed scroll below, set against a blue field. A gold-outlined strip occupies the circumference of the field, bearing the words "DEPARTMENT OF JUSTICE" above, and "FEDERAL BUREAU OF INVESTIGATION" below. A circle of thirteen golden stars surrounds the shield and laurels, representing unity of purpose and the original thirteen founding states of the United States. The laurel branches represent academic honors, distinction and fame. The two branches depict a total of 46 leaves, standing for the number of U.S. states when the FBI was founded in 1908.

The blue field behind the central shield represents justice, as do the scales set on a golden field at the shield's top. Five parallel vertical red and white stripes make up the rest of the shield, echoing the colors of the Flag of the United States. As with the flag, there is one more red stripe than white. The stripes symbolize the values of the FBI; the red stripes stand for courage, valor, and strength, while the white ones represent light, cleanliness, and truth.

Below the wreath and shield is a scroll bearing the words "Fidelity, Bravery, Integrity". This slogan, which was devised in 1935 by FBI Inspector W.H. Drane Lester, describes the high moral standards and high level of motivation the FBI expects from its staff. It also reflects the Bureau's own initials as a "backronym" of sorts. However, a Newsweek article from 2008 credits Edward Allen Tamm, once a top aide to J. Edgar Hoover who regularly briefed President Franklin Roosevelt on domestic intelligence matters with the invention of the motto: "He's credited in some bureau histories with inventing (in 1935) not only the bureau's name, but its official motto: Fidelity, Bravery, Integrity."

The outer edge of the seal consists of a series of beveled golden peaks. This represents the severe challenges that the FBI faces every day and alludes to the ruggedness of the organization. The gold color represents the richness and history of the Bureau's mission.

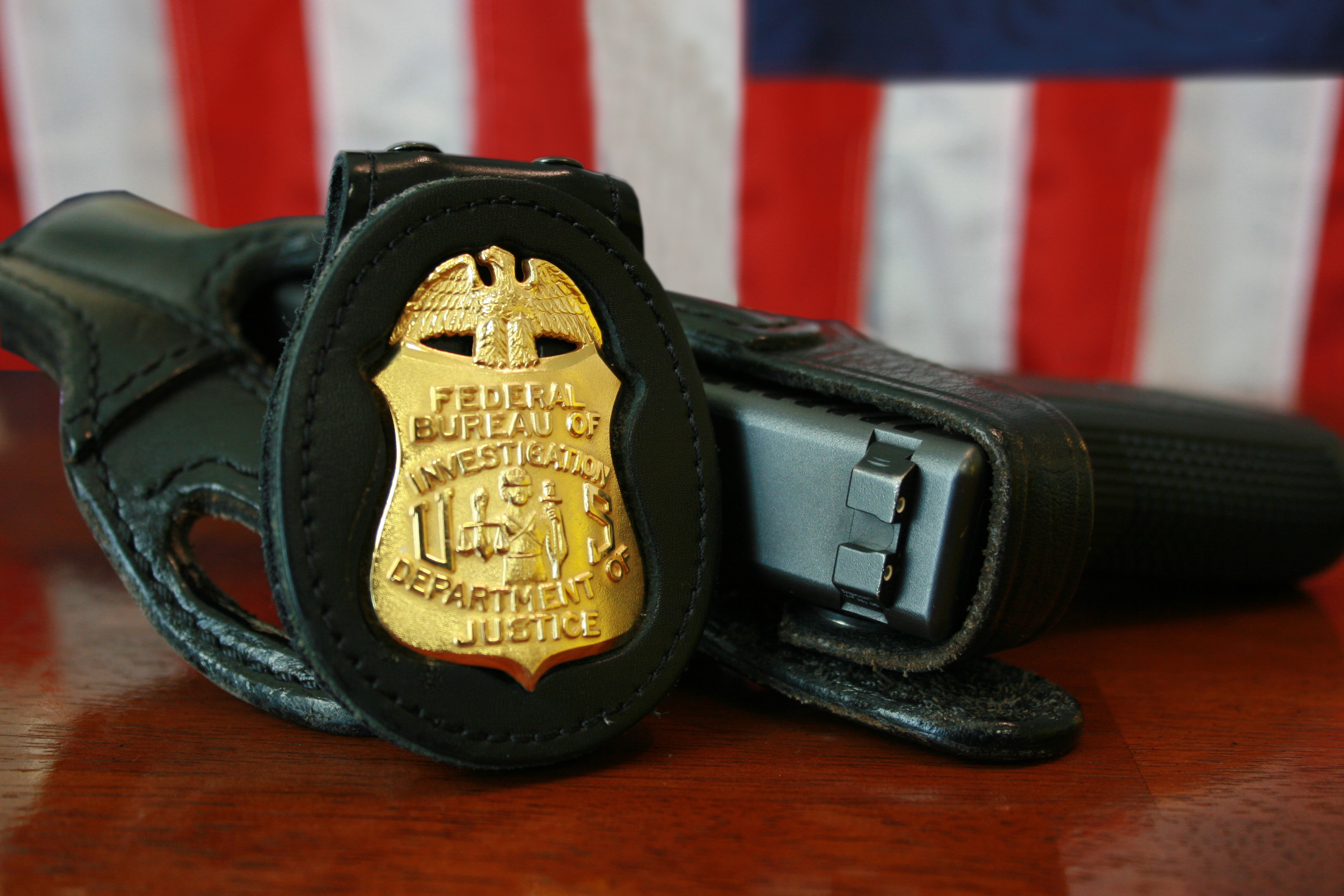
The FBI badge, which is distinct from the FBI seal and does not use the same design

The FBI seal should not be confused with the FBI badge, which dates from 1935 and has a very different design that does not incorporate the seal. The badge consists of a miniature shield crested by an eagle. The face of the shield depicts Justitia holding her scales and a sword, alongside the names of the FBI and the Department of Justice.

A modified version of the FBI seal is used by the Federal Bureau of Investigation Police, the uniformed division of the FBI tasked with the protection of the Bureau's facilities, properties and personnel. The FBI Police symbol is a golden shield with the seal set at the center flanked by twin laurel branches. At top and bottom are scrolls bearing the words "FBI" and "POLICE" respectively.

== History ==
The badge of an FBI special agent.

When the FBI was founded in 1908 as the Bureau of Investigation (later the Division of Investigation) it was a subordinate organization of the United States Department of Justice. It had no logo of its own but used the existing seal of the Department of Justice. In 1935 it became an independent service within the Department of Justice and changed its name to the present-day Federal Bureau of Investigation. To reflect its new identity it adopted a version of the Department of Justice seal with the words "Federal Bureau of Investigation" and "Fidelity, Bravery, and Integrity" added to the outer band.

Various proposals were floated over the next few years for a new FBI seal that would retain the connection with the Department of Justice while expressing the FBI's own values and distinct identity. The current version of the seal dates from 1940 and was designed by Special Agent Leo Gauthier, who was a draftsman, artist and illustrator. He had previously designed a flag for the Bureau and used elements of that design to create a new seal. It was accepted immediately.

== Usage ==
Since 1954, Federal law has protected the FBI seal against unauthorized commercial use. The unauthorized use of the seal is subject to prosecution under federal criminal law, including Sections 701 and 709 of Title 18 of the United States Code. The latter Section prohibits the use of the words "Federal Bureau of Investigation" or the initialism "F.B.I.",

in connection with any advertisement, circular, book, pamphlet or other publication, play, motion picture, broadcast, telecast, or other production, in a manner reasonably calculated to convey the impression that such advertisement, circular, book, pamphlet or other publication, play, motion picture, broadcast, telecast, or other production, is approved, endorsed, or authorized by the Federal Bureau of Investigation.

The FBI has taken action against commercial vendors making unauthorized use of the seal and other Federal agency seals and symbols, such as Smokey Bear. For instance, a New York toy manufacturer used the FBI seal on a toy water pistol. The manufacturer was warned by the FBI to remove the seal or face prosecution.

However, anyone using the name or seal in a non-commercial way, such as for purposes of satire or parody, where no remuneration is realized, is protected by the 1st Amendment.

=== Commercial works ===
The seal has, however, been used with permission in many commercial works of popular culture. An authorized history of the Bureau, The F.B.I. Story, was published in 1956 with the seal displayed on the book's dust jacket with the permission of FBI chief J. Edgar Hoover. Hoover also permitted the long-running ABC series The F.B.I., on which he was a consultant, to open and close every episode with the image of the seal.

Cast, painted or engraved versions of the seal are displayed on a number of properties associated with the FBI. J. Edgar Hoover's grave at Congressional Cemetery in Washington, D.C. is surrounded by a wrought-iron fence bearing a cast metal replica of the FBI seal. The "J. Edgar Hoover Bench" stands nearby bearing a modified version of the seal that represents the Society of Former Special Agents. A large engraved version of the FBI seal is displayed at the entrance of the J. Edgar Hoover Building, the FBI headquarters in Washington, D.C.

Uses of the FBI seal
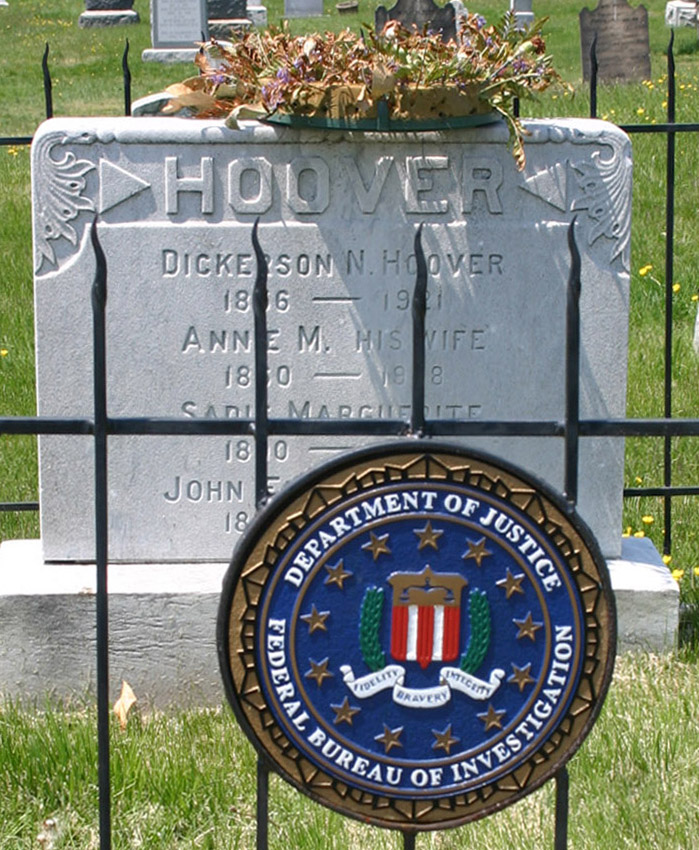
The FBI seal displayed at the grave of J. Edgar Hoover at Congressional Cemetery, Washington D.C.

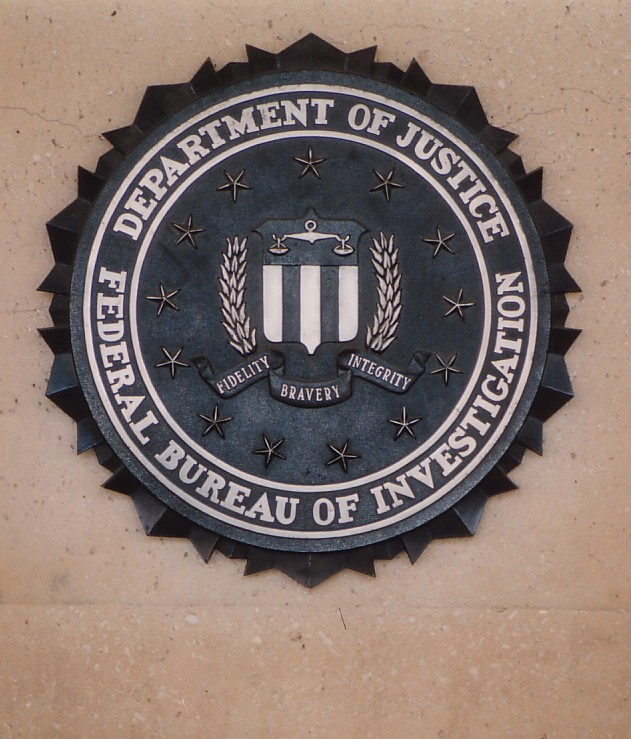
A metal-cast version of the FBI seal at the entrance of the J. Edgar Hoover Building in Washington D.C.

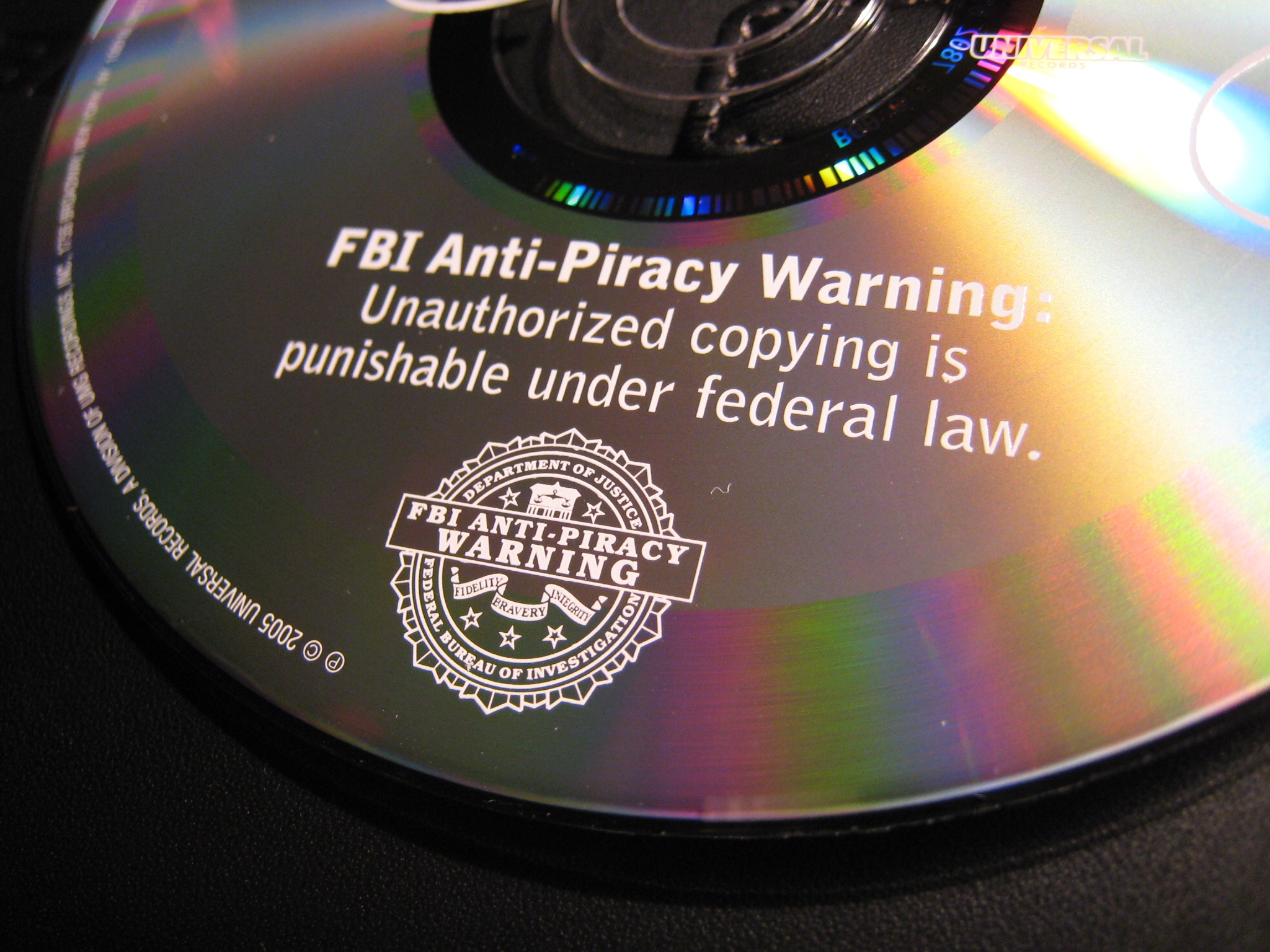
A DVD with the FBI Anti-Piracy Warning, incorporating a modified FBI seal

An example of a "Winners Don't Use Drugs" attract mode screen, featuring the FBI Seal in pixel art form

=== Anti-piracy campaign ===
The FBI seal has become a familiar sight for users of digital entertainment media in the United States due to its appearance on DVDs, CDs and video games. It appeared in arcade games during a late 1980s anti-drugs campaign, alongside the words "Winners Don't Use Drugs". In February 2004, the FBI announced a joint anti-piracy program with the Motion Picture Association of America, Recording Industry Association of America, Entertainment Software Association and the Software and Information Industry Association under which an "FBI Anti-Piracy Warning" would be displayed prominently on disks, sleeves and in DVD title cards. The warning notice displays the FBI seal defaced with a strip bearing the words "FBI ANTI-PIRACY WARNING", accompanied by a text warning of the illegality of unauthorized copying. The anti-piracy campaign was initiated following the passage by Congress of the Piracy Deterrence and Education Act of 2003, which ordered the FBI to develop a program against copyright infringement. The seal is used under a Memorandum of Understanding agreed between the FBI and the Recording Industry Association of America. Since August 13, 2012, the FBI has permitted all copyright holders to use the seal, subject to restrictions.

In particular, the seal must be used adjacent to the text "The unauthorized reproduction or distribution of a copyrighted work is illegal. Criminal copyright infringement, including infringement without monetary gain, is investigated by the FBI and is punishable by fines and federal imprisonment." or "Warning: Unauthorized duplication is a violation of applicable laws."

=== Wikimedia Commons ===
In July 2010, the FBI ordered the Wikimedia Foundation to remove the seal from Wikimedia Commons servers, stating that its unauthorized presence on the encyclopedia was illegal under 18 U.S.C. §701. Wikimedia's general counsel, Mike Godwin, declined to comply, stating that the FBI was misconstruing the law, which he said was intended to prevent people from using fake FBI badges or profiting from the use of the seal.

=== Logo ===
Uses of the FBI seal
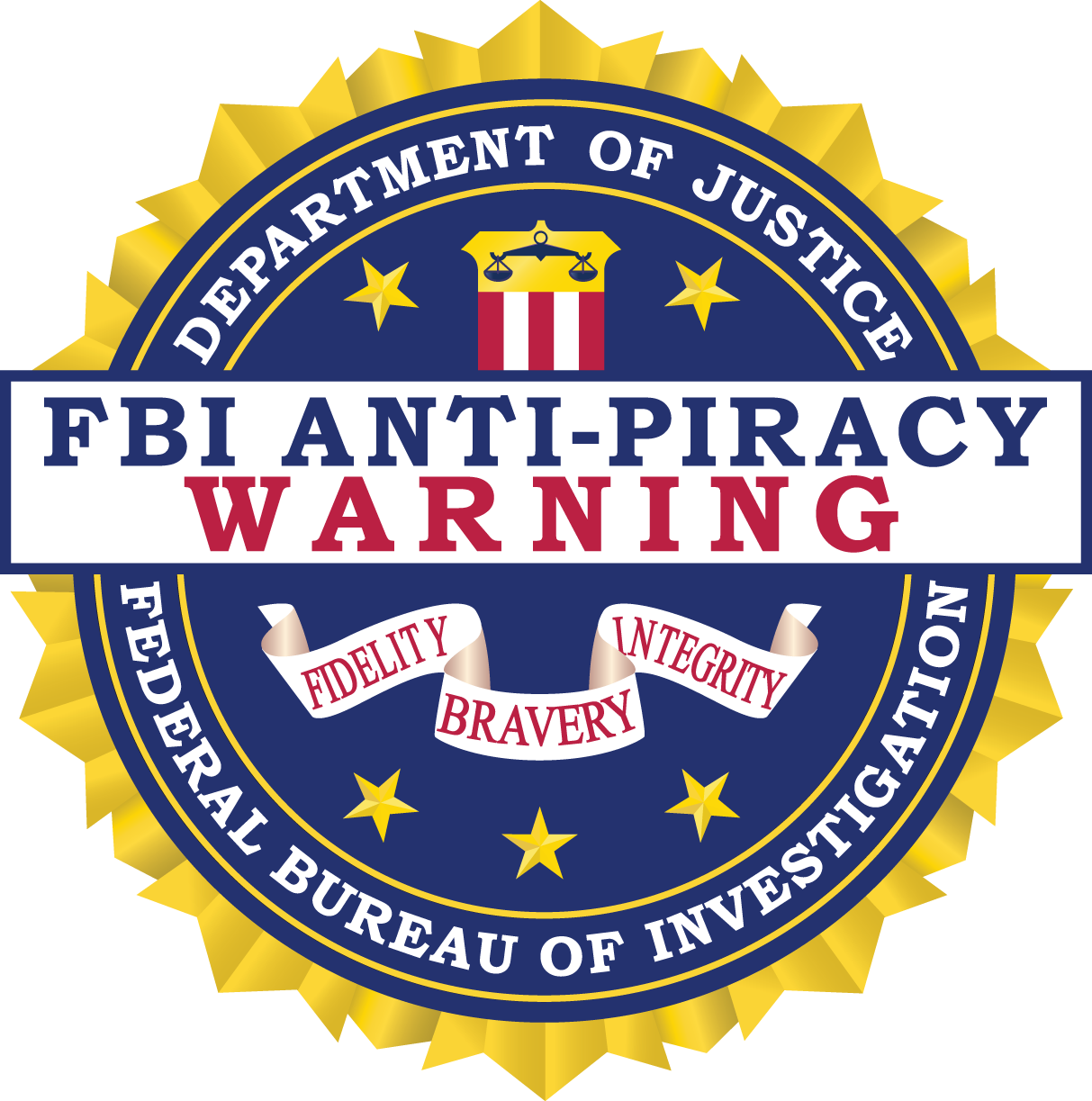
FBI Warning Old

FBI Warning New

== See also ==
- Copyright status of work by the U.S. government
- Great Seal of the United States
- Seal of the president of the United States
- Seal of the United States Senate
- Winners Don't Use Drugs
