= Internet and Technology Law Desk Reference =

1999 book by Michael Dennis Scott

- Book cover
- Author: Michael Dennis Scott
- Language: English
- Subject: Information technology law
- Genre: Law
- Publisher: Aspen Publishers
- Publication date: 1999
- Publication place: United States
- Pages: 1106
- ISBN: 0-7355-8309-9
- OCLC: 41548365

Internet and Technology Law Desk Reference is a non-fiction book about information technology law, written by Michael Dennis Scott. The book uses wording from legal cases to define information technology jargon, and gives citations to individual lawsuits. Scott received his B.S. degree from Massachusetts Institute of Technology and graduated with a J.D. from the University of California, Los Angeles. He has taught as a law professor at Southwestern Law School. The book was published by Aspen Law and Business in 1999. Multiple subsequent editions were published under the imprint Aspen Publishers. Internet and Technology Law Desk Reference was recommended by the Cyberlaw Research Resources Guide at the James E. Rogers College of Law, and has been used as a reference in law journals including University of Pennsylvania Journal of International Economic Law, and Berkeley Technology Law Journal.

== Author ==
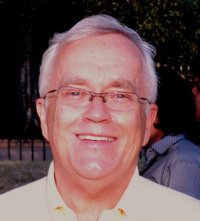
Michael D. Scott (2009)

Michael Dennis Scott is a lawyer; in 1999 he resided in Los Angeles. Scott graduated in 1967 from Massachusetts Institute of Technology with a Bachelor of Science degree in mathematics and computer science. He received his J.D. degree in 1974 from the University of California, Los Angeles. He is a member of the United States Patent Bar and the California State Bar. He was employed by Perkins Coie LLP in 1999. Comtex News Network described Scott in 1999 as, "a veteran Internet law expert". He taught as a professor in the subject of legal studies at Southwestern Law School. Scott was a cofounder of the World Computer Law Congress, and a director of the Computer Law Association.

== Contents ==
Internet and Technology Law Desk Reference is a reference work on the subject of law. The reference utilizes written opinions from judges in lawsuits and court-approved wording to provide definitions for information technology related legal jargon. Entries are organized in alphabetical order, with citations given to individual lawsuits.

== Publication history ==
Internet and Technology Law Desk Reference was published in 1999 by Aspen Law and Business. Subsequent editions were released by Aspen Law and Business as well as under the imprint Aspen Publishers.

== Reception ==
Shaun Esposito of the James E. Rogers College of Law recommended the reference work in his Cyberlaw Research Resources Guide, and wrote, "It could be useful both in defining unfamiliar terms and in starting research on any topic listed in the work." In 2000, board members of the CBA Journal Lawrence M. Friedman and John Levin used the book to compile a self-assessment tool for readers to determine their proficiency with technology and internet terminology. The University of Chicago Legal Forum described Internet and Technology Law Desk Reference as a publication involved in "compiling internet definitions used in court opinions".

== See also ==
- Code and Other Laws of Cyberspace
- Cyber Rights
- The Hacker Crackdown
- Small Pieces Loosely Joined
- Who Controls the Internet?
