= Nazi analogies =

Comparisons related to Nazism

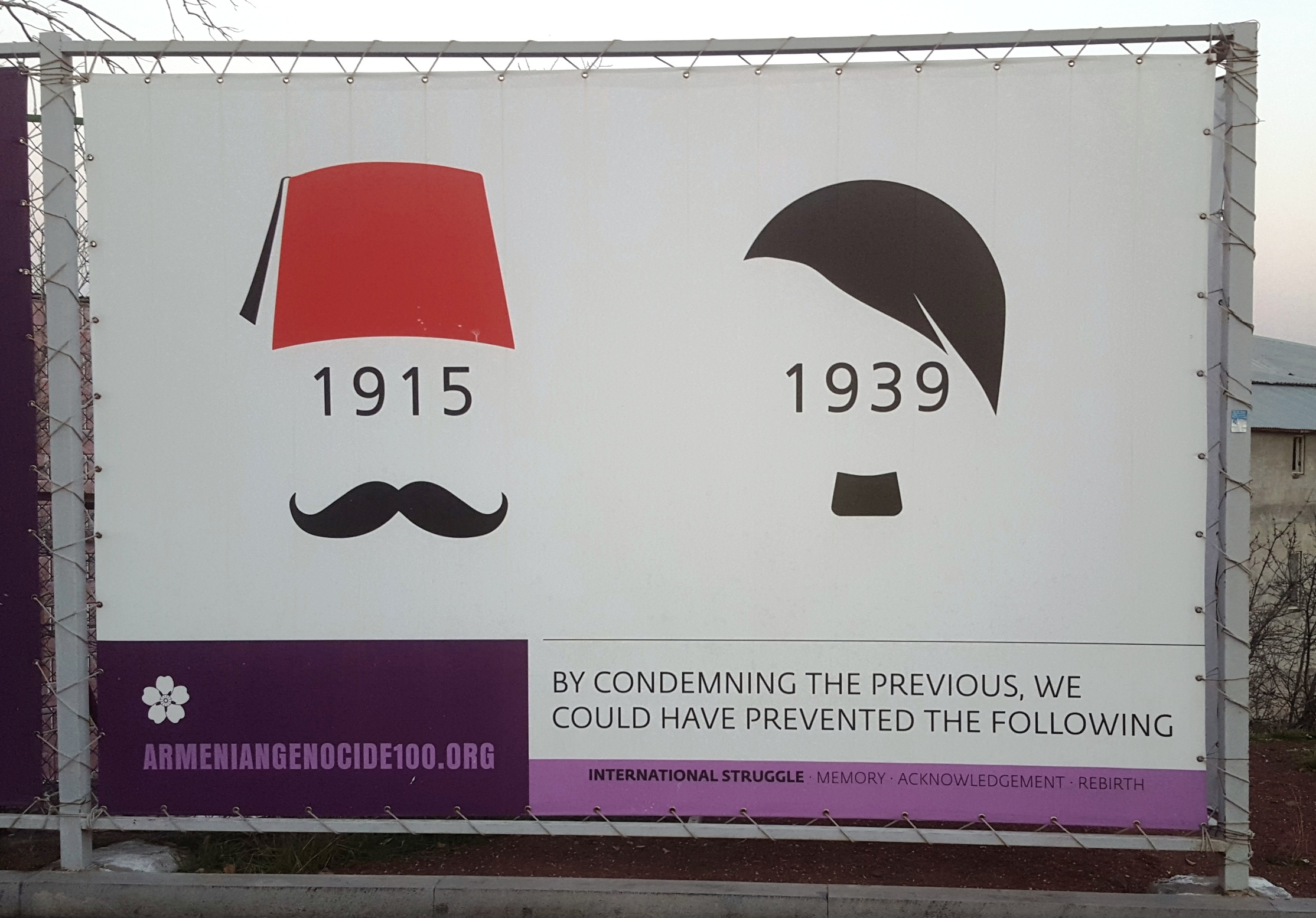
Poster comparing the Armenian genocide (perpetrated by the Ottoman Empire) to the Holocaust (perpetrated by Nazi Germany)

Nazi analogies or Nazi comparisons are any comparisons or parallels which are related to Nazism or Nazi Germany, which often reference Adolf Hitler, Joseph Goebbels, the SS, or the Holocaust. Despite criticism, such comparisons have been employed for a wide variety of reasons since Hitler's rise to power. Some Nazi comparisons are logical fallacies, such as reductio ad Hitlerum. Godwin's law asserts that a Nazi analogy is increasingly likely the longer an internet discussion continues; Mike Godwin also stated that not all Nazi comparisons are invalid.

== Origins ==
During the Nazi era, Adolf Hitler was frequently compared to previous leaders including Napoleon, Philip of Macedon, and Nebuchadnezzar. The comparers wanted to make Hitler understandable to their audiences by comparing him to known leaders, but according to historian Gavriel Rosenfeld the comparisons obscured Hitler's radical evil. When Hitler became Chancellor of Germany on 30 January 1933, Hitler was compared to Napoleon by The Brooklyn Eagle and Middletown Times. The Night of Long Knives was compared at the time to such events as the St. Bartholomew’s Day Massacre, a 1572 massacre of French Huguenots by Catholics. The comparison between Hitler and Philip of Macedon was used by some American journalists who advocated the United States's entry into World War II. Others felt that this did not go far enough and used other metaphors such as Nebuchadnezzar and Tamerlane: Harold Denny of The New York Times visited Buchenwald in 1945, writing "Tamerlane built his mountain of skulls ... Hitler’s horrors … dwarf all previous crimes". In a public radio broadcast of 24 August 1941, Winston Churchill compared Nazi war crimes in the Soviet Union to the Mongol invasion of Europe, saying "There has never [since] been methodical, merciless butchery on such a scale, or approaching such a scale."

Nazism has come to be a metaphor for evil, according to academic Brian Johnson, leading to Nazi comparisons. The Anti-Defamation League suggested that the Nazi era had become the "most available historical event illustrating right versus wrong." Rosenfeld noted that Hitler "gained immortality as a historical analogy" and that he became:

... a hegemonic historical analogy. He did not so much join the ranks of earlier historical symbols of evil as render them unusable. Indeed, perhaps because Western observers became convinced that wartime analogies had underestimated the Nazi dictator’s radicalism, they began to employ Hitler as the baseline for evaluating all new threats.

== Legal issues ==
According to the ACLU, calling someone a Nazi is protected free speech under the First Amendment to the United States Constitution. In 2008, British radio presenter Jon Gaunt called a guest a Nazi on a BBC radio, for which he was fired. An Ofcom complaint against Talksport, his employer, was upheld by the United Kingdom High Court of Justice in 2010. In 2019, the Ukrainian S14 group won a defamation suit against Hromadske, a newspaper which had labeled them neo-Nazi, despite such a characterization having been used by Reuters and The Washington Post. In Israel, a law was proposed in 2014 that would make it illegal to call someone a Nazi or use symbols associated with the Holocaust (such as striped clothing or yellow stars), in order to respect Holocaust survivors.

In April 2022, following Russia’s invasion of Ukraine in February 2022, an amendment was adopted in Russia to the law "On Perpetuating the Victory of the Soviet People in the Great Patriotic War of 1941–1945." This amendment prohibits "publicly equating the goals, decisions, and actions of the leadership, command, and military personnel of the USSR with the goals, decisions, and actions of representatives of the Third Reich." These restrictions apply to public statements as well as texts published in the media or on the internet. Penalties for violations include a fine ranging from 1,000 to 2,000 rubles or administrative detention for up to 15 days (Article 13.48 of the Code of Administrative Offenses of the Russian Federation).

== Fallacies ==
Reductio ad Hitlerum, first coined in 1951 by Leo Strauss, is a logical fallacy which discounts an idea because it was promoted by Hitler or Nazis. Godwin's law, coined in 1990 by Mike Godwin, asserts that "as an online discussion grows longer, the probability of a comparison involving Nazis or Hitler approaches 1". A related convention is "Whoever mentions Hitler first, loses the argument." However, Godwin has said that not all Nazi comparisons are invalid.

== List ==
=== Animals ===
Individuals and groups have drawn direct comparisons between animal cruelty and the Holocaust. The analogies began soon after the end of World War II, when literary figures, many of them Holocaust survivors, Jewish, or both, began to draw parallels between the treatment of animals by humans and the treatments of prisoners in Nazi death camps. The Letter Writer, a 1968 short story by Isaac Bashevis Singer, is a literary work often cited as the seminal use of the analogy. The comparison has been criticized by organizations that campaign against antisemitism, including the Anti-Defamation League (ADL) and the United States Holocaust Memorial Museum, particularly since 2006, when PETA began to make heavy use of the analogy as part of campaigns for improved animal welfare.

The use of the term holocaust in relation to the mass killing of animals predates the Nazi Holocaust. In 1897, American zoologist and animal-rights advocate J. Howard Moore published an essay titled "The Unconscious Holocaust", in which he applied the term to the killing of animals for food, clothing, and sport. At the time, holocaust was commonly used in the broader sense of complete or wholesale destruction, rather than as the later proper name for the Nazi genocide of Ashkenazi Jews.

=== Anti-smoking ===
Public health measures adopted since World War II in order to reduce smoking have been compared with anti-tobacco movement in Nazi Germany, which is considered by proponents of anti-smoking measures to be a fallacious reductio ad Hitlerum which often exaggerates how much the Nazis actually opposed smoking. Historian of science Robert N. Proctor speculates that Nazi associations "forestall[ed] the development of effective anti-tobacco measures by several decades".

=== Bioethics ===
According to an editorial by Arthur Caplan in Science, bioethics questions including "stem cell research, end-of-life care, the conduct of clinical trials in poor nations, abortion, embryo research, animal experimentation, genetic testing, or human experimentation involving vulnerable populations" are often compared to Nazi eugenics and Nazi human experimentation. According to Caplan, the Nazi analogy has the potential to shut down debate and its capricious use is unethical. Similar arguments were made by Nat Hentoff in 1988, writing for The Hastings Center Report.

=== Chinese Communist Party ===
Analogies between China and Nazi Germany have also been drawn by Australian politician Andrew Hastie. However, Edward Luce considers China–Nazi comparisons a form of anti-Chinese sentiment and he also considers them a potentially self-fulfilling prophecy. In July 2020, British Jewish leader Marie van der Zyl said that there were "similarities" between the treatment of the Uyghurs in China and the crimes which were committed by Nazi Germany. In 2020, Axel Dessein wrote that the Chinese Communist Party was better described as lowercase "national socialist"—in the vein of the Nazi Party and the Czech National Social Party—than communist, due to "its marriage between socialist means and national ends".

==== Chinazi flag ====
"Chinazi" flag

The "Chinazi" (赤納粹) flag — a blend of "China" and "Nazi" — was created by combining the flag of the People's Republic of China and that of the Nazi Party to draw comparisons between the Chinese and the 1933–1945 German Nazi governments. Variations include golden stars forming a Nazi swastika on a red background and Nazi swastikas replacing the golden stars on the Chinese flag. American journalist and political commentator Nicholas Kristof mentioned graffiti in Hong Kong using the 'Chinazi' label to denounce the influence of the Chinese government, he reported in The New York Times.

=== Donald Trump ===
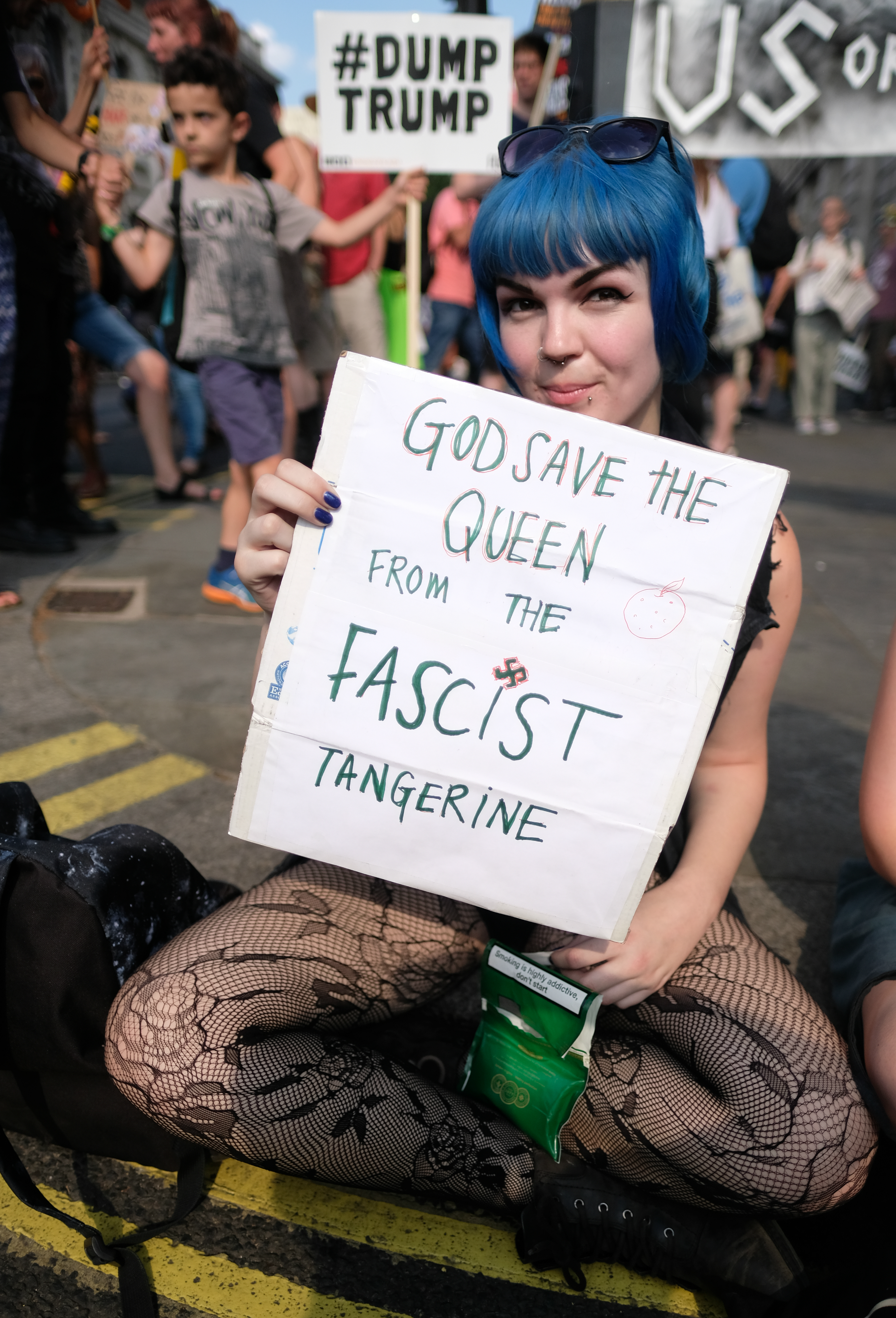
Protestor opposing the 2018 state visit of Donald Trump to the United Kingdom

While qualified comparisons between Hitler's rise to power and the victory of Donald Trump in the 2016 United States presidential election have been made by some historians, NeverTrump Republicans, and Democrats, the comparison is opposed by other scholars and commentators who cite reasons such as Trump lacking a coherent ideology, not supporting a dictatorship or political violence, and his rejection of interventionist foreign policy. According to Rosenfeld's research, the frequency of comparisons between Trump and Hitler in the media peaked in 2017 and the number of internet searches for "Trump and Hitler" has also decreased from a high point between mid-2015 and mid-2017.

=== European Union ===
Some Eurosceptic politicians, including UKIP's Gerard Batten and Finns Party MP Ville Tavio, have compared the European Union to Nazi Germany. Then Ukrainian politician Viktor Medvedchuk of the pro-Russia party Ukrainian Choice argues that "objectively" the European Union is the heir of Nazi Germany. In many Greek newspapers during the Greek government-debt crisis, caricatures appeared depicting the European troika and Angela Merkel as Nazis preparing to reenact the Axis occupation of Greece. Merkel was also depicted as Hitler during demonstrations against her 2016 visit to the Czech Republic; the demonstrators objected to her approach to the European migrant crisis. Opponents argue that the Nazi empire was formed by conquest and that joining the EU is voluntary, among other differences.

=== Indian Wars ===
The Nazi war of annihilation on the Eastern Front has been compared to the United States Army's conduct in the Indian Wars. However, Native American demographic collapse was mostly caused by introduced disease, rather than warfare, and historians disagree as to whether the Indian Wars, or parts thereof, can be considered a form of genocide.

=== Islamism and Islamic fundamentalism ===
Some historians, including Matthias Küntzel, Wolfgang G. Schwanitz and Barry Rubin, argue that there is a high degree of similarity between the ideologies of Nazism and Islamism, especially in their radical antisemitism and xenophobia. For Christopher Hitchens, "Islamofascism" is a form of clerical fascism analogous to Christian fascism.

=== Israel ===
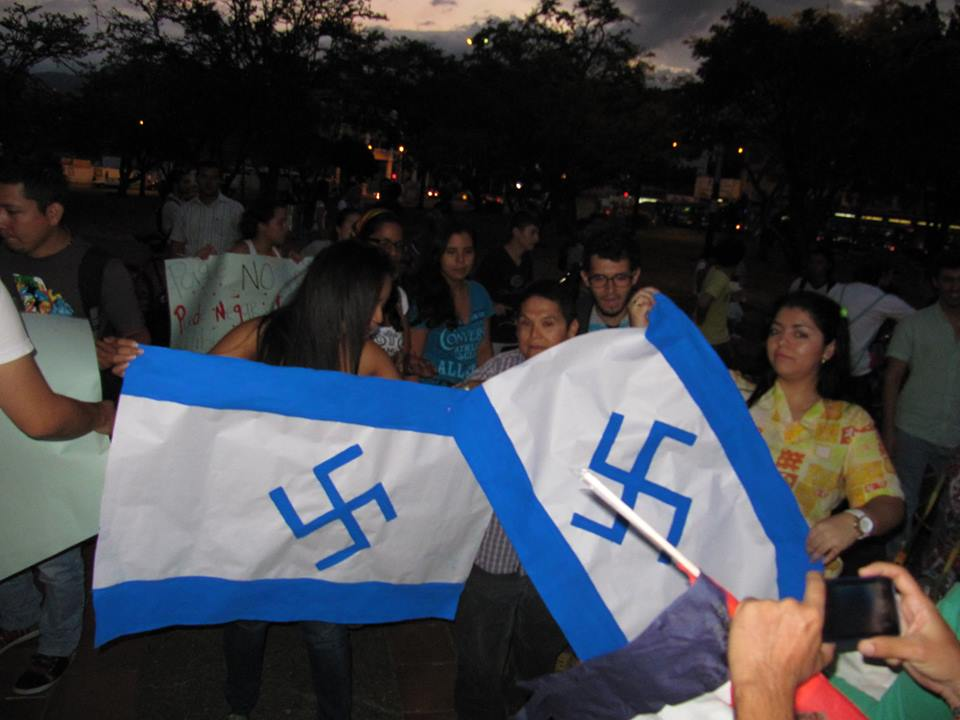
Pro-Palestine protest in Cali, Colombia

Comparisons between Israel and Nazi Germany occur frequently in the political discourse of anti-Zionism and as part of the broader criticism of Israel. Given the legacy of the Holocaust, the nature of these comparisons, and particularly whether they constitute antisemitism, is a matter of fervent controversy.

Comparisons between Zionism and Nazism have been made by academics, politicians, journalists, and public figures, both Jewish and not, since before the establishment of Israel. Some scholars suggest these comparisons can be rhetorical tools without any specific antisemitic intent, or that they can be an informed and necessary response to Israeli policies or actions. Others state such comparisons lack historical and moral equivalence, risk inciting antisemitism and may serve as a form of Holocaust inversion, denial or minimisation.

During the 20th century, a wide variety of political figures and governments, especially those on the left, have invoked comparisons between Israel or Zionism, and Nazism. In the 21st century, politicians who have made such comparisons include Turkish president Recep Tayyip Erdoğan, Brazilian president Luiz Inácio Lula da Silva, Venezuelan president Hugo Chávez, Colombian president Gustavo Petro and others.

=== LGBTQ issues ===
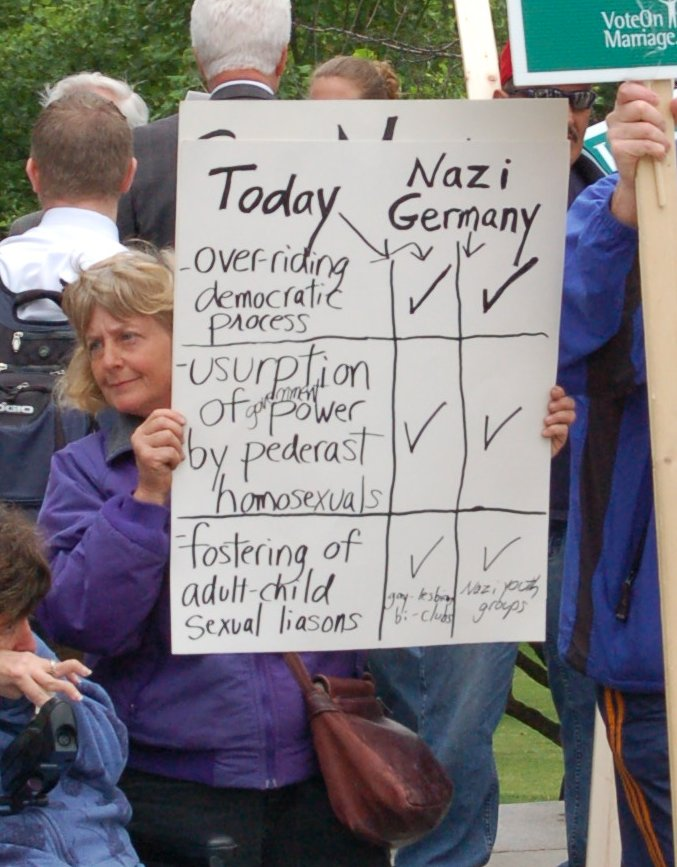
A protestor opposing gay marriage in Boston in 2007 makes a comparison between the contemporary United States ("Today") and Nazi Germany.

The AIDS–Holocaust metaphor can be controversial. While Susan Sontag said that "It's wrong to compare a situation in which there was real culpability to one in which there is none", it is also the case that homophobic views resulted in dismissal of the suggestion of research and treatment being supported, severely exacerbating the epidemic.

In 2017, Patriarch Kirill, the highest authority in the Russian Orthodox Church, compared same-sex marriage to Nazism because in his opinion both were a threat to traditional family. In 2019, Pope Francis criticized politicians who lash out at homosexuals, Romani people, and Jews, saying that it reminded him of Adolf Hitler's speeches in the 1930s.

Some advocates of trans-exclusionary radical feminism have compared transgender medical care to Nazi human experimentation or transsexuality to Nazism.

=== Paul Kagame ===
In a speech made on 9 December 2023, Félix Tshisekedi, the president of the Democratic Republic of the Congo, compared Rwandan President Paul Kagame to Hitler, saying that if he "[wants] to behave like Adolf Hitler by having expansionist aims, I promise he will end up like Adolf Hitler". A Rwandan government spokesperson condemned this statement, accusing Tshisekedi of making "a loud and clear threat". This remark was made in the context of an offensive in the DRC launched by the March 23 Movement, a rebel group widely considered to be directly supported by Rwanda, despite official Rwandan denials.

=== "Second Holocaust" ===
The term "second Holocaust" is used in reference to perceived threats to the State of Israel, Jews, and Jewish life. In 2018, Israeli Prime Minister Benjamin Netanyahu said "Iran wants a second Holocaust" and to "destroy another six million plus Jews", after his Iranian counterpart described Israel as a "malignant cancerous tumor". In 2019, Israeli education minister Rafi Peretz compared Jewish intermarriage to a "second Holocaust".

=== Stalinism ===
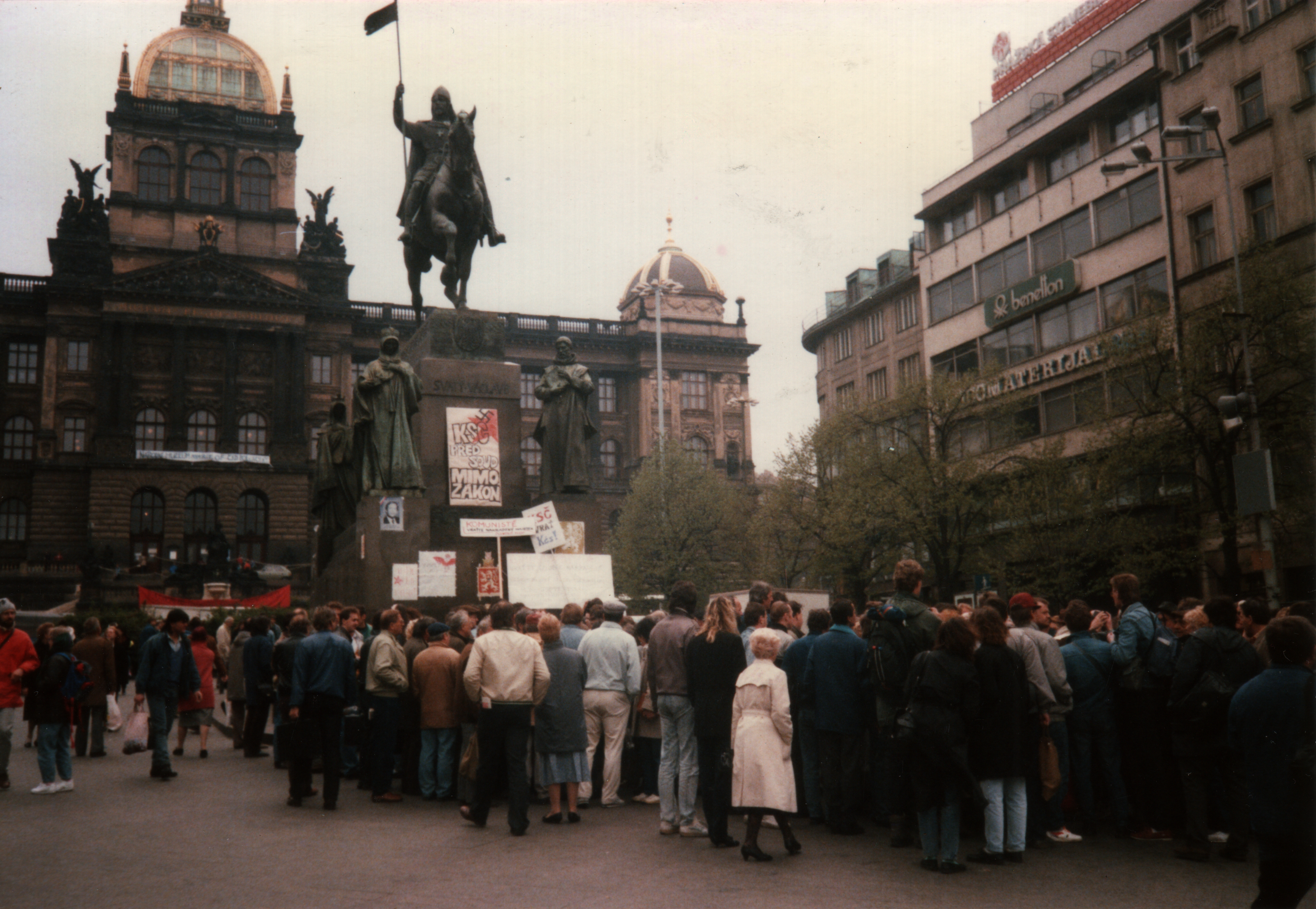
At a demonstration in Prague in April 1990, a swastika is drawn on an anti-KSČ (Communist Party of Czechoslovakia) election banner.

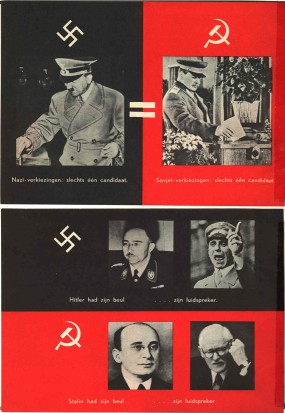
A document from the collection of Henri Max Corwin, equating propaganda images produced by Nazism with those produced by Stalinism

Various historians and other authors have carried out a comparison of Nazism and Stalinism, with particular consideration to the similarities and differences between the two ideologies and political systems, the relationship between the two regimes, and why both came to prominence simultaneously. During the 20th century, comparisons of Nazism and Stalinism were made on totalitarianism, ideology, and personality cult. Both regimes were seen in contrast to the liberal democratic Western world, emphasising the similarities between the two.

American political scientists Hannah Arendt, Zbigniew Brzezinski, and Carl Joachim Friedrich, and historian Robert Conquest were prominent advocates of applying the concept of totalitarianism to compare Nazism and Stalinism. Historians Sheila Fitzpatrick and Michael Geyer highlight the differences between Nazism and Stalinism, with Geyer saying that the idea of comparing the two regimes has achieved limited success. Historian Henry Rousso defends the work of Friedrich et al., while saying that the concept is both useful and descriptive rather than analytical, and positing that the regimes described as totalitarian do not have a common origin and did not arise in similar ways. Historians Philippe Burrin and Nicolas Werth take a middle position between one making the leader seem all-powerful and the other making him seem like a weak dictator. Historians Ian Kershaw and Moshe Lewin take a longer historical perspective and regard Nazism and Stalinism not as examples of a new type of society but as historical anomalies and dispute whether grouping them as totalitarian is useful.

Other historians and political scientists have made comparisons between Nazism and Stalinism as part of their work. The comparison has long provoked political controversy, and in the 1980s led to the historians' dispute within Germany known as the Historikerstreit. In April 2022, following Russia’s invasion of Ukraine in February 2022, an amendment was adopted in Russia to the law "On Perpetuating the Victory of the Soviet People in the Great Patriotic War of 1941–1945." This amendment prohibits "publicly equating the goals, decisions, and actions of the leadership, command, and military personnel of the USSR with the goals, decisions, and actions of representatives of the Third Reich." These restrictions apply to public statements as well as texts published in the media or on the internet. Penalties for violations include a fine ranging from 1,000 to 2,000 rubles or administrative detention for up to 15 days (Article 13.48 of the Code of Administrative Offenses of the Russian Federation)..

=== Vladimir Putin ===
Putler (Russian: Путлер), sometimes extended to Vladolf Putler (Владольф Путлер, pronounced [ˈvladəlʲf ˈputlʲɪr]), is a derogatory neologism and portmanteau formed by merging the names of Vladimir Putin and Adolf Hitler. Often used in the slogan "Putler Kaput!" (German: Putler kaputt!; Russian: Путлер Капут!) by people opposed to Putin, the term has a negative connotation.

=== Wealth ===
In 2014, venture capitalist and billionaire Thomas Perkins wrote to The Wall Street Journal to compare what he called "the progressive war on the American one percent" to what Jews faced during Kristallnacht. According to Jordan Weissmann, writing in The Atlantic, this is "the worst historical analogy you will read for a long, long time". Perkins was also criticized on Twitter, with The New York Times journalist Steven Greenhouse writing, "As someone who lost numerous relatives to the Nazi gas chambers, I find statements like this revolting & inexplicable". Perkins later apologized for the comparison.

== Criticism ==
According to a press release by the United States Holocaust Memorial Museum, "Careless Holocaust analogies may demonize, demean, and intimidate their targets." Jonathan Greenblatt, director of the Anti-Defamation League, said that "misplaced comparisons trivialise this unique tragedy in human history... particularly when public figures invoke the Holocaust in an effort to score political points."

In 2017, the German journalist Pieke Biermann argued that Nazi comparisons were undergoing a process which was akin to inflation due to the increased and inappropriate use of them.

Amanda Moorghen, a researcher for the English-Speaking Union, said that frequently, Nazi comparisons were not persuasive: "Wielding accusations of fascism as an insult doesn't help to get your audience on side - instead, you raise the stakes of the debate, forcing a polarisation between 'good' and 'evil' into a discussion that may have reasonable positions on both sides." Instead, she recommended criticizing the opponent's argument directly.

== See also ==
- Holocaust trivialization
- Holocaust uniqueness debate
- Never again

== Sources ==
- Geyer, Michael; Fitzpatrick, Sheila (2009). Beyond Totalitarianism: Stalinism and Nazism Compared. Cambridge University Press. doi:10.1017/CBO9780511802652. ISBN 978-0-521-72397-8.
- Kershaw, Ian; Lewin, Moshe, eds. (1997). Stalinism and Nazism: Dictatorships in Comparison. Cambridge University Press. doi:10.1017/CBO9780511815775. ISBN 978-0-521-56521-9.
- Lustick, Ian S. (2019). Paradigm Lost: From Two-State Solution to One-State Reality. University of Pennsylvania Press. ISBN 978-0-8122-5195-1.
- Rosenfeld, Gavriel (2019). The Fourth Reich: The Specter of Nazism from World War II to the Present. Cambridge University Press. ISBN 978-1-108-49749-7.
- Rousso, Henry; Golsan, Richard Joseph, eds. (2004). Stalinism and Nazism: History and Memory Compared. U of Nebraska Press. ISBN 978-0-8032-9000-6.
