= Godwin's law =

Internet adage about Nazi comparisons

Godwin's law (or Godwin's rule), short for Godwin's law of Nazi analogies, is an Internet proverb asserting: "As an online discussion grows longer, the probability of a comparison involving Nazis or Hitler approaches one." The law's creator, Mike Godwin, maintains these comparisons often trivialize the Holocaust. It is an example of the reductio ad Hitlerum fallacy.

== History ==
Promulgated by American attorney and author Mike Godwin in 1990, Godwin's law originally referred specifically to Usenet newsgroup discussions. He stated that he introduced Godwin's law in 1990 as an experiment in memetics, specifically to address the ubiquity of such comparisons which he believes regrettably trivialize the Holocaust. Later, it was applied to any threaded online discussion, such as Internet forums, chat rooms, and social-media comment threads, as well as to speeches, articles, and other rhetoric where reductio ad Hitlerum occurs.

In 2012, Godwin's law became an entry in the third edition of the Oxford English Dictionary.

In 2021, Harvard researchers published an article showing that the Nazi-comparison phenomenon does not occur with statistically meaningful frequency in Reddit discussions.

== Generalization, corollaries, and usage ==
Godwin's law can be applied mistakenly or abused as a distraction, a diversion, or even censorship, when miscasting an opponent's argument as hyperbole even when the comparison made by the argument is appropriate. Godwin has criticized the over-application of the adage, claiming that it does not articulate a fallacy, but rather is intended to reduce the frequency of inappropriate and hyperbolic comparisons:

Although deliberately framed as if it were a law of nature or of mathematics, its purpose has always been rhetorical and pedagogical: I wanted folks who glibly compared someone else to Hitler to think a bit harder about the Holocaust.

Godwin's law has many corollaries, some considered more "canonical" (by being adopted by Godwin himself) than others. For example, many newsgroups and other Internet discussion forums have a tradition that, when a Nazi or Hitler comparison is made, the thread is finished and whoever made the comparison loses whatever debate is in progress. This idea is itself sometimes mistakenly referred to as Godwin's law.

Godwin rejects the idea that whoever invokes Godwin's law has lost the argument, and suggests that, applied appropriately, the rule "should function less as a conversation ender and more as a conversation starter." In an interview with Time Magazine, Godwin said that making comparisons to Hitler would actually be appropriate under the right circumstances:

I urge people to develop enough perspective to do it thoughtfully. If you think the comparison is valid, and you've given it some thought, do it. All I ask you to do is think about the human beings capable of acting very badly. We have to keep the magnitude of those events in mind, and not be glib. Our society needs to be more humane, more civilized and to grow up.

In August 2017, while commenting on the Unite the Right rally in Charlottesville, Virginia, Godwin himself endorsed and encouraged social-media users to compare its alt-right participants to Nazis.

Godwin has denied the need to update or amend the rule. On June 24, 2018, he wrote, in an opinion piece for the Los Angeles Times: "It still serves us as a tool to recognize specious comparisons to Nazism – but also, by contrast, to recognize comparisons that aren't." Additionally, when a potential subject of Godwin's law seems "intent on making the Hitler comparison", the comparison with fascism may be appropriate rather than devaluing the argument; a "MAGA" corollary to the Law recognizes the pernicious embrace of Nazi-inspired tropes and phrases by the alt-right.

As an illustration, in an interview with Politico published on December 19, 2023, Godwin pointed out that Donald Trump might actually be using Hitler's rhetoric on purpose, for instance when accusing immigrants of "poisoning the blood" of the country or calling his political opponents "vermin":

You could say the 'vermin' remark or the 'poisoning the blood' remark, maybe one of them would be a coincidence. But both of them pretty much make it clear that there's something thematic going on, and I can't believe it's accidental."

In an opinion published the same day in The Washington Post, Godwin stated: "Yes, it's okay to compare Trump to Hitler. Don't let me stop you." In the article, Godwin says that "when people draw parallels between Donald Trump's 2024 candidacy and Hitler's progression from fringe figure to Great Dictator, we aren't joking. Those of us who hope to preserve our democratic institutions need to underscore the resemblance before we enter the twilight of American democracy."

== See also ==
- Association fallacy
- Law of truly large numbers
- List of eponymous laws
- Nazi analogies
- Poe's law
- Reductio ad Hitlerum
- Straw man
- Thought-terminating cliché
