= Reductio ad Hitlerum =

Logical fallacy

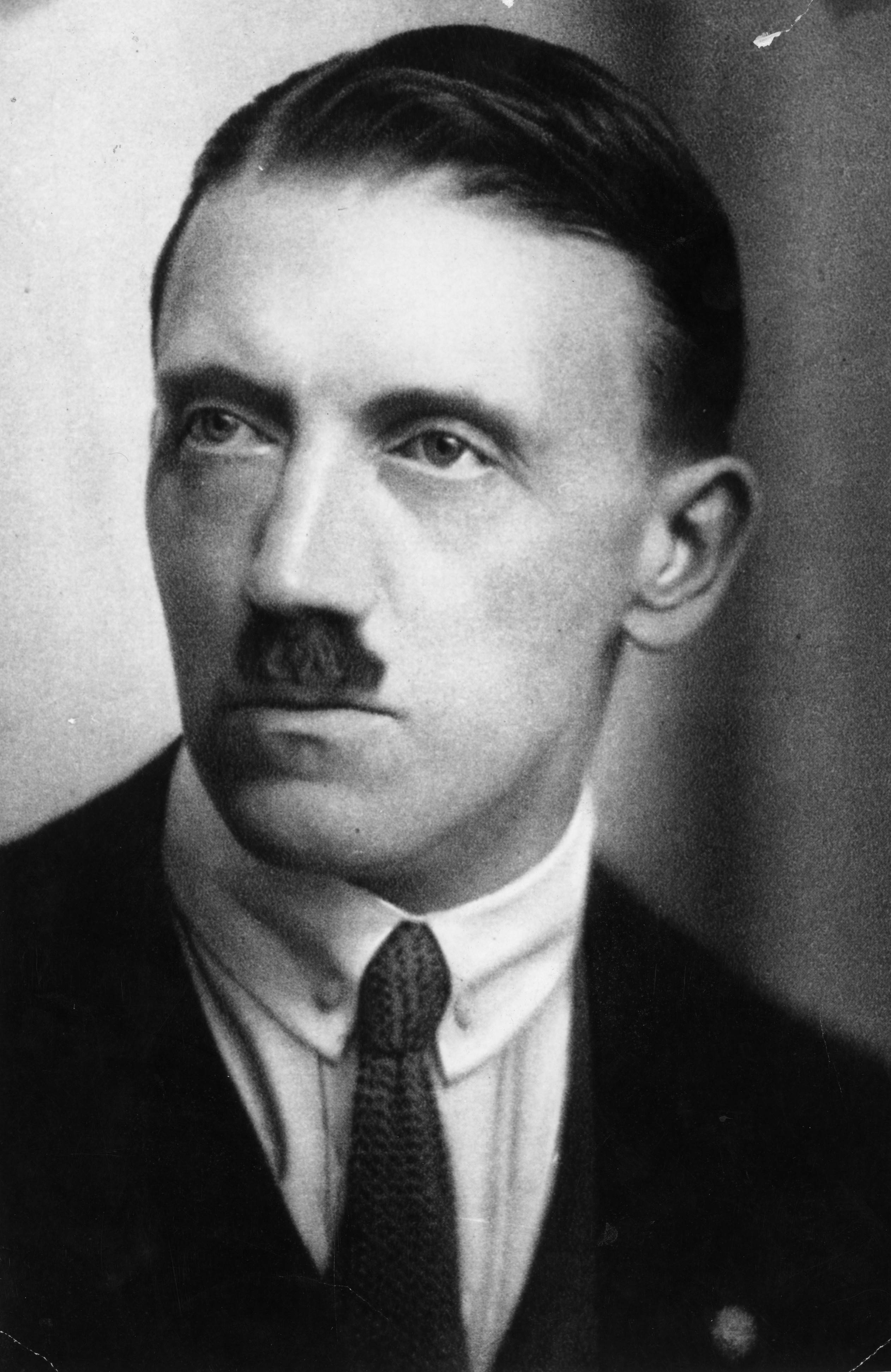
Portrait of Adolf Hitler, c. 1923, the dictator of Nazi Germany from 1933 to 1945

Reductio ad Hitlerum (Latin for 'reduction to Hitler'), also known as the Hitler fallacy or playing the Nazi card, is an attempt to invalidate someone else's argument on the basis that the same idea was promoted or practised by Adolf Hitler or the Nazi Party. Arguments may be termed reductio ad Hitlerum if they are fallacious (e.g., arguing that because Hitler abstained from eating meat or opposed smoking, anyone else who does so is a Nazi). Contrarily, straightforward arguments critiquing specifically fascist components of Nazism like Führerprinzip are not part of the association fallacy.

Formulated by Leo Strauss in 1953, reductio ad Hitlerum takes its name from the term used in logic called reductio ad absurdum ("reduction to absurdity"). According to Strauss, reductio ad Hitlerum is a type of ad hominem, ad misericordiam, or a fallacy of irrelevance. The suggested rationale is one of guilt by association. It is a tactic often used to derail arguments because such comparisons tend to distract and anger the opponent.

== Definition ==
Reductio ad Hitlerum is a type of association fallacy. The argument is that a policy leads to—or is the same as—one advocated or implemented by Adolf Hitler or Nazi Germany and so "proves" that the original policy is undesirable. Another type of reductio ad Hitlerum is asking a question of the form "You know who else...?" with the deliberate intent of impugning a certain idea or action by implying Hitler had that idea or performed such an action.

A comparison to Hitler or Nazism is not a reductio ad Hitlerum if it illuminates an argument instead of causing distraction from it. Straightforward comparisons can be used to criticize fascist components of Nazism such as the Führerprinzip. However, one could argue fallaciously that because Hitler abstained from eating meat or was opposed to smoking, ipso facto anyone else who has these opinions is a Nazi.

== History ==
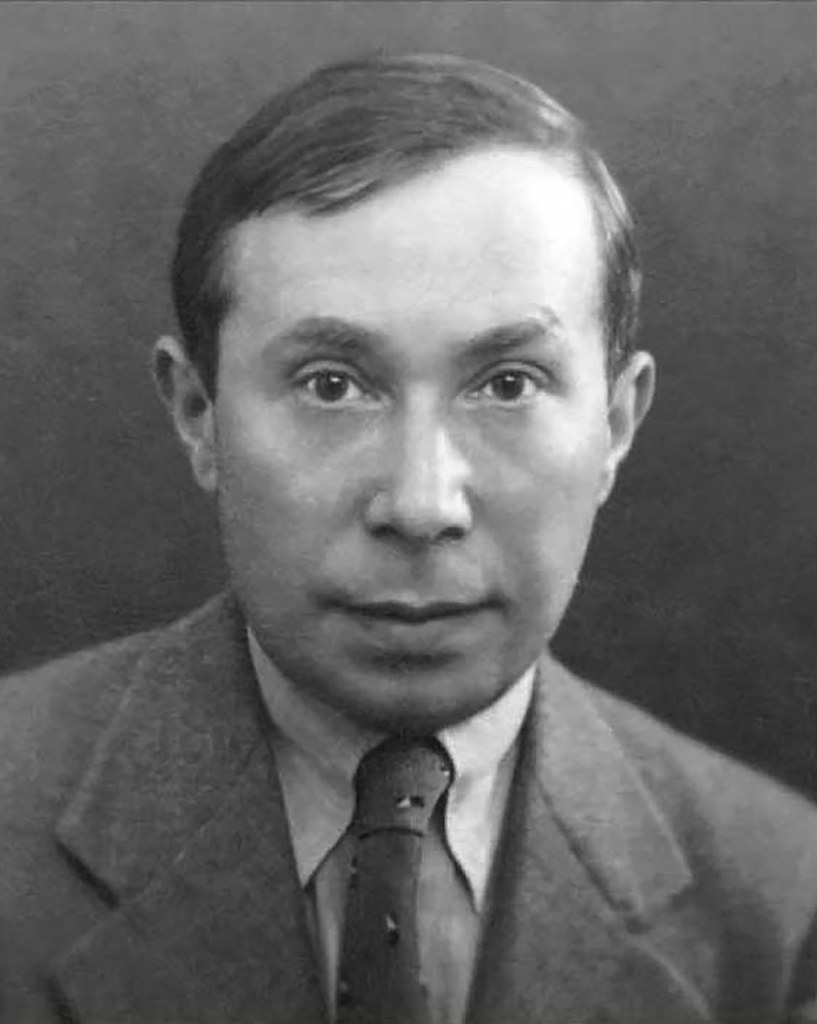
The phrase was coined by philosopher Leo Strauss.

The phrase reductio ad Hitlerum is first known to have been used in an article written by University of Chicago professor Leo Strauss for Measure: A Critical Journal in spring 1951, although it was made famous in a book by Strauss published in 1953 Natural Right and History, Chapter II:

In following this movement towards its end we shall inevitably reach a point beyond which the scene is darkened by the shadow of Hitler. Unfortunately, it does not go without saying that in our examination we must avoid the fallacy that in the last decades has frequently been used as a substitute for the reductio ad absurdum: the reductio ad Hitlerum. A view is not refuted by the fact that it happens to have been shared by Hitler.

The phrase was derived from the term reductio ad absurdum (a form of argumentation). The argumentum variant takes its form from the names of many classic fallacies such as argumentum ad hominem. The ad Nazium variant may be further humorously derived from argumentum ad nauseam.

== Limits to classification as a fallacy ==
Historian Daniel Goldhagen, who had written about the Holocaust, argues that not all comparisons to Hitler and Nazism are logical fallacies since if they all were, there would be nothing to learn from the events that resulted in the Holocaust. He argues in his book Hitler's Willing Executioners that many people who were complicit or active participants in the Holocaust and subsequently in fascist and neo-Nazi movements have manipulated the historical narrative to escape blame or to deny aspects of the Holocaust. Claims that allegations of antisemitism are reductio ad Hitlerum have also been employed by David Irving, a British Holocaust denier.

In 2000, Thomas Fleming claimed that reductio ad Hitlerum was being used by his opponents against his values:

Leo Strauss called it the reductio ad Hitlerum. If Hitler liked neoclassical art, that means that classicism in every form is Nazi; if Hitler wanted to strengthen the German family, that makes the traditional family (and its defenders) Nazi; if Hitler spoke of the "nation" or the "folk", then any invocation of nationality, ethnicity, or even folkishness is Nazi ...

== Antecedents ==
Although named for Hitler, the logical fallacy existed before World War II. Other individuals from history were used as stand-ins for evil. Author Tom Holland compares the use of Hitler as the standard of evil with earlier invocations of the Devil (such as the phrase 'Deal with the Devil'). During the 18th, 19th and early 20th centuries, the Pharaoh of the Book of Exodus was commonly considered the most villainous person in history. During the years prior to the American Civil War, abolitionists referred to enslavers as modern-day Pharaohs. After VE Day, Pharaoh continued to appear in the speeches of social reformers like Martin Luther King Jr.

Judas Iscariot and Pontius Pilate were also commonly held up as pure evil. However, there was no universal Hitler-like person, and different regions and times used different stand-ins. In the years after the American Revolution, King George III was often vilified in the United States. "King George" comparison was publicly used as recently as 1992 by Pat Buchanan when referring to president George H. W. Bush, in the course of the U.S. presidential campaign. During the American Civil War, some Confederates called Lincoln a "modern Pharaoh".

== Invocations ==
In 1991, Michael André Bernstein alleged reductio ad Hitlerum over a full-page advertisement placed in The New York Times by the Lubavitch community after the Crown Heights riot under the heading "This Year Kristallnacht Took Place on August 19th Right Here in Crown Heights". Henry Schwarzschild, who had witnessed Kristallnacht, wrote to The New York Times that "however ugly were the anti-Semitic slogans and the assaultive behavior of people in the streets [during the Crown Heights riots] ... one thing that clearly did not take place was a Kristallnacht".

Since Hitler was against smoking, some in the tobacco industry invoked the argument to compare those who are against smoking to Nazis.

In response to the perceived use of reductio ad Hitlerum in cancel culture, comedian Ricky Gervais has mocked those who commit the fallacy, implying that since Hitler was a vegetarian, those who argue in this way would have to see vegetarians as Nazis.

== See also ==
- Godwin's law
- List of fallacies
- Red-baiting (reductio ad Stalinum)
