= Free Culture =

Free Culture may refer to:

- Free Culture (book) by Lawrence Lessig
- Free-culture movement, a social movement for free culture (inspired partly by the book)
- Students for Free Culture, formerly FreeCulture.org, an international student organization supporting free culture

== See also ==
- Open society, a concept originally developed by philosopher Henri Bergson and then by Austrian and British philosopher Karl Popper
- Free content, any kind of functional work, artwork, or other creative content, which meets the free content definition, having no significant legal restriction relative to people's freedom to use, distribute copies, modify, and to distribute derived works of the content
- Creative Commons, a non-profit organization headquartered in San Francisco, California, United States devoted to expanding the range of creative works available for others to build upon legally and to share
- Remix culture
