= Mitch Glazier =

American lawyer and lobbyist

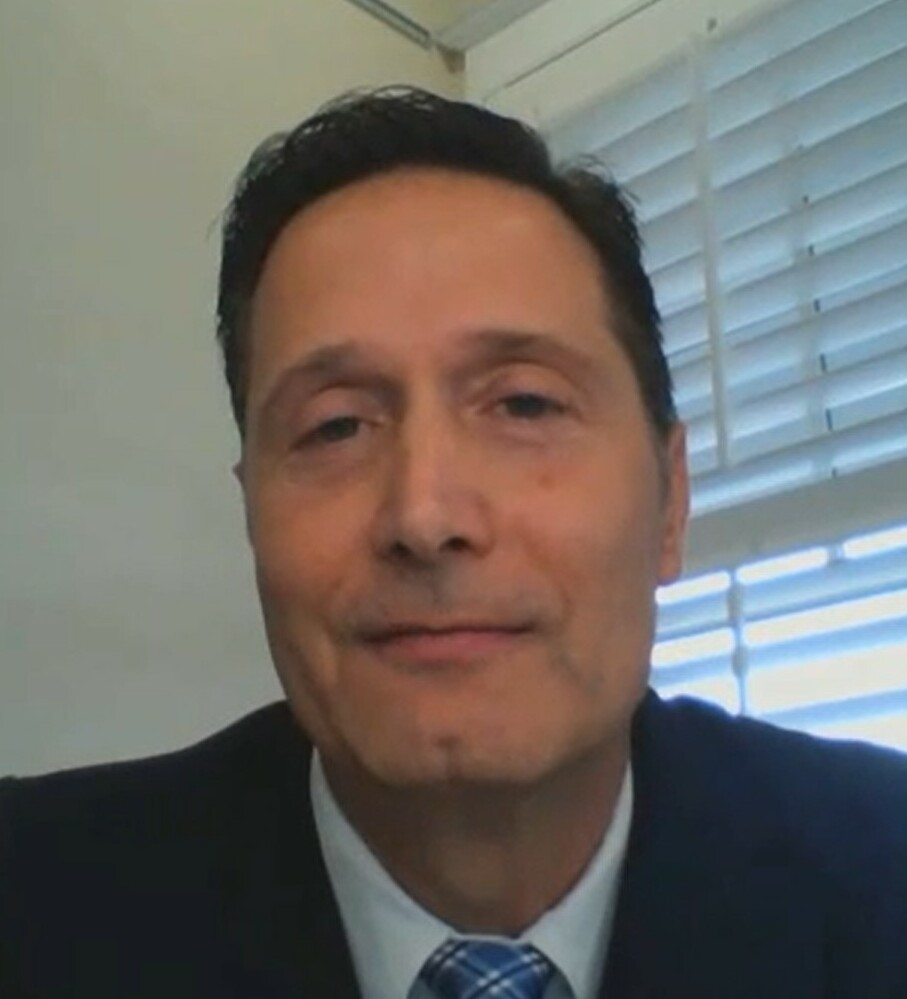
- Glazier in 2020
- Born: 1966 (age 59–60)
- Education: Northwestern University (BS); Vanderbilt University (JD)
- Occupation: Lobbyist

Mitch Glazier (born 1966) is an American lawyer and lobbyist. He is the chairman and CEO of the Recording Industry Association of America (RIAA).

== Education and career ==
Glazier received a B.S. in social policy from Northwestern University in 1987 and a J.D. from Vanderbilt University Law School. He has been admitted to the Illinois and Washington, D.C., bars. He served as law clerk to the Judge Wayne Andersen of the US District Court for the Northern District of Illinois.

Glazier practiced law at Chicago law firm Neal, Gerber & Eisenberg as a commercial litigator. He previously served on the boards of the American Association of People with Disabilities, the Internet Education Foundation, and is Chairperson Emeritus of Musicians on Call.

=== Chief Counsel to House Judiciary ===
He was chief counsel to the United States House Judiciary Subcommittee on Courts, the Internet, and Intellectual Property. He played a role in drafting the No Electronic Theft Act, the Digital Millennium Copyright Act, and the Copyright Term Extension Act.

==== Work for hire ====
In 1999, Glazier, a Congressional staff attorney, inserted, without public notice or comment, substantive language into the final markup of a "technical corrections" section of copyright legislation, classifying many music recordings as "works made for hire", thereby stripping artists of their copyright interests and transferring those interests to their record labels. Shortly afterwards, Glazier was hired as Senior Vice President of Government Relations and Legislative Counsel for the RIAA, which vigorously defended the change when it came to light. The battle over the disputed provision led to the formation of the Recording Artists' Coalition, which successfully lobbied for repeal of the change.

=== RIAA ===
In 2000, Glazier was hired by the Recording Industry Association of America where he handled the organization's government relations. In August 2011, he was named senior executive vice president. In January 2019, he was named Chairman and CEO.

=== The Capitol Hill Film Classic ===
In 2018, Glazier was appointed and presided over as the first Head of Jury for the Capitol Hill Film Classic, a short film competition in Washington, D.C.
