= Remix (book) =

2008 book by Lawrence Lessig

Remix: Making Art and Commerce Thrive in the Hybrid Economy
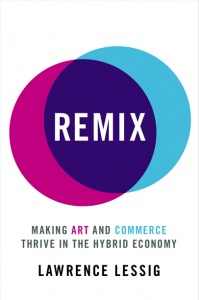
- Author: Lawrence Lessig
- Publisher: Penguin Press
- Publication date: 2008
- Pages: 352
- ISBN: 978-1-59420-172-1
- OCLC: 213308970
- Preceded by: Code: Version 2.0
- Followed by: Republic, Lost

Remix: Making Art and Commerce Thrive in the Hybrid Economy is Lawrence Lessig's fifth book. The book was made available for free download and remixing under the CC BY-NC Creative Commons license via Bloomsbury Academic. It is still available via the Internet Archive. It details a hypothesis about the societal effect of the Internet, and how this will affect production and consumption of popular culture to a "remix culture".

== Summary ==
In Remix, Lawrence Lessig, a Harvard law professor and a respected voice in what he deems the "copyright wars", describes the disjuncture between the availability and relative simplicity of remix technologies and copyright law. Lessig insists that copyright law as it stands now is antiquated for digital media since every "time you use a creative work in a digital context, the technology is making a copy". Thus, amateur use and appropriation of digital technology is under unprecedented control that previously extended only to professional use.

Lessig insists that knowledge and manipulation of multi-media technologies is the current generation's form of "literacy"- what reading and writing was to the previous. It is the vernacular of today. The children growing up in a world where these technologies permeate their daily life are unable to comprehend why "remixing" is illegal. Lessig insists that amateur appropriation in the digital age cannot be stopped but only 'criminalized'. Thus most corrosive outcome of this tension is that generations of children are growing up doing what they know is "illegal" and that notion has societal implications that extend far beyond copyright wars. The book is now available as a free download under one of the Creative Commons' licenses (CC BY-NC 3.0).

== Read-only culture vs. read/write culture ==
Lessig outlines two cultures - the read-only culture (RO) and the read/write culture (RW). The RO culture is the culture we consume more or less passively. The information or product is provided to us by a 'professional' source, the content industry, that possesses an authority on that particular product/information. Analog technologies inherently supported RO culture's business model of production and distribution and limited the role of the consumer to just that, 'consuming'.

Digital technology, however, does not have the 'natural' constraints of the analog that preceded it. "What before was both impossible and illegal is now just illegal"(38). Steve Jobs was the first to see potential in this new market made possible by digital technology. RO culture had to be recoded in order to compete with the "free" distribution made possible by the Internet. iTunes Music store was proof of this. While it provided digital music it was protected by a digital rights management (DRM) code from re-distribution. Lessig uses this key example to show that it is possible to achieve a business model which balances access and control and is equally attractive to both the consumers and the creators. In addition, digital technologies have changed the way we think about 'access'. Today, most of us would never structure our day around a particular program because we know that it is most likely available online - even if it is not necessarily free of charge. Lessig insists, using Amazon as his premiere example, that the future of entertainment and advertising lies in accumulating information about a consumer and tailoring the product to their preferences.

As opposed to RO culture, Read/Write culture has a reciprocal relationship between the producer and the consumer. Taking works, such as songs, and appropriating them in private circles is exemplary of RW culture, which was considered to be the 'popular' culture before the advent of reproduction technologies. The technologies and copyright laws that soon followed, however, changed the dynamics of popular culture. As it became professionalized people were taught to defer production to the professionals.

Lessig posits that digital technologies provide the tools for reviving RW culture and democratizing production. He uses blogs to explain the three layers of this democratization. Blogs have redefined our relationship to the content industry as they allowed access to non-professional content. The 'comments' feature that soon followed provided a space for readers to have a dialogue with the amateur contributors. 'Tagging' of the blogs by users based on the content provided the necessary layer for users to filter the sea of content according to their interest. The third layer added bots that analyzed the relationship between various websites by counting the clicks between them and, thus, organizing a database of preferences. The three layers working together established an "ecosystem of reputation"(61) that served to guide users through the blogosphere. Lessig uses the blog model to demonstrate a wider conclusion - while there is no doubt many amateur online publications cannot compete with the validity of professional sources, the democratization of digital RW culture and the 'ecosystem of reputation' provides a space for many talented voices to be heard that was not available in the pre-digital RO model.

== Hybrid economies ==
There are three economies that Lessig introduced in his book. The first is the commercial economy. He says that commercial economies at their very center value money the most and build value around the monetary. Second to this is the sharing economy which completely ignores money as an item of value and instead focuses on valuing things that are not monetary. But settled in between the two is a third, the hybrid economy. He asserts that the hybrid economy will be the dominant force with the rise of the web, and in order for it thrive the two economies from which it borrows from must be preserved. Conceptually the monetizing nature from the commercial, and the 'lending' quality of the sharing economy are necessary to ensure that the hybrid doesn't lose sight of economic gain or doesn't lose the willingness to obtain economic resources.

=== The internet and commons ===
The internet is essentially the hub for this type of economy. With more people utilizing it as a platform for sharing and monetizing, the internet's primary function is split in two. In order for people to 'Remix' they need the internet for its open and free design.

Remix, according to Lessig, is not solely digital, but also relates to the act of reading and applying texts to their personal life. Culturally, critically taking in what is going on (the original content) and developing an opinion that can be shared and given transformed meaning, is also considered remixing.

Most of the debate in Remix is in regard to ownership. Due to the fact that remixing is limitless, it becomes difficult to end. Every mix becomes a resource for another new mix and expands to others even if they are never seen. When it comes to the internet, ownership has become a murky subject. Companies who originated a piece of work are owners of that product, but only if it is copyrighted and protected legally. That being said, people without access to these legalities are unprotected and liable to get their ideas and content stolen. This is where the commons becomes prevalent.

He defines the commons as resources that are available for everyone equally in a certain group. The internet was invented for flexible accessibility and thus facilitates innovation. This is Lessig's philosophy, however the issue comes with a price tag. The fight to define who owns a creative work of art if it contains other works not owned by the party is what Lessig says is "killing creativity". Although people have become used to this, he argues that it is for this reason that he claims that it is an attempt at "counterrevolution".

=== Free software ===
Richard Stallman is vocal about his stance on the positive repercussions of utilizing free software, namely Linux. Essentially both Stallman and Lessig are on the same page. When it comes to 'hybrid' economies, Linux fits the description with its selling point being "benefits", instead of "features". This on its own has no standing for 'justice' but rather the profitability of such a software.

Remixing is this software's very nature. The appeal is to "sell" the benefits of its use. People no longer have to wait for a company to fix bugs, or other issues with the software and instead they can collaborate and ultimately do it themselves. This can be done with other software, but the downside is that legally with paid proprietary software there are repercussions to prevent, the software from being "remixed" and sold as an alternative "original"'.

== The prevalence of YouTube ==
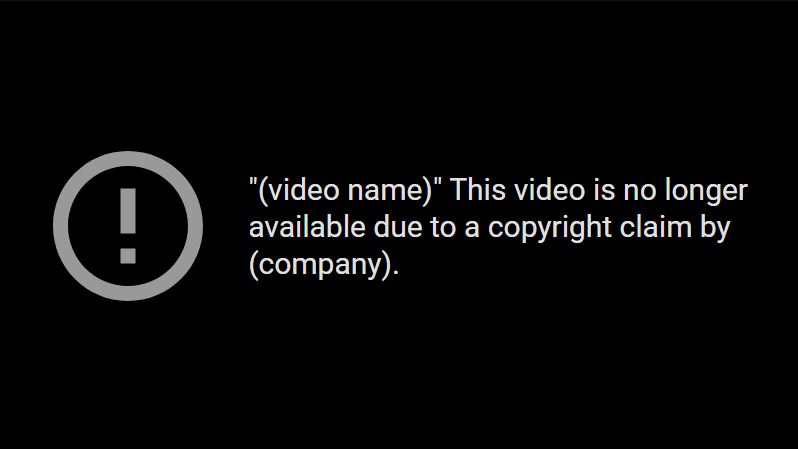
YouTube's growing issue in copyright claims

With the internet comes what Lessig described as community spaces, with site YouTube up for major debate for its ability to both provide original content and exist as an open bank for content to Remix. The website provides users a domain to not only consume, but to make creative content. Creativity in this sense, relates to the combining of elements or materials with an individual's original ideas to create a unique product. Lessig has had his own fight with the platform when his Lecture got taken down in 2013 on grounds of violating Copyright laws due to a song from the band Phoenix being used in part of the presentation. However, due to the non-commercialized and transformed nature of his usage, the video should have fallen under Fair use. This issue is an example of exactly what he is fighting for.

In addition to the Digital Millennium Copyright Act of 1998, YouTube also allows the claimant to place advertisements on the video. This is done as retribution for using or allowing copyrighted media in the video, and allows the user to keep the video up without having to deal with legalities. The website is taking the emphasis off of the creation, and placing it on the monetary value that it holds. Lessig argues that these issues should be separated when it comes to amateur non commercialized content.

With growing frequency, YouTube has begun copyright striking, and taking down videos that appear to have claimed content in them in any way. Without the claim in question, to be the main feature in the video, it can merely be a song playing in the background that can take a user's work off the web. While original content featuring sole a user's own ideas and content does exist, this is not the focus of Remixing, or Lessig's point. It is not solely creating new and unique ideas with novelty resources, but instead pulling from multiple sources to give way to new products.

To that Lessig's rebuttal is that the work made on such platforms should be free of legal ownership aside from its originator. These new products leverage the references in their original work in order to build a new and different meaning; which has no implications of being 'better' or 'worse' than its origin.

== The remix ==
Lessig argues that today digital culture permeates our lifestyle to such extent - an average teenager will spend an hour per weekend day using the computer for leisure and only 7 minutes reading - that "it is no surprise that these other forms of 'creating' are becoming an increasingly dominant form of 'writing'"(69). Previous generations used textual quotes to build on writings before them. Today, this process of quoting or collage is manifest through digital media. The remix utilizes the (multi-media) language through which the current generations communicate. They quote content from various sources to create something "new". Thus, the remix provides a commentary on the sounds and images it utilizes the same way a critical essay provides commentary on the texts it quotes. One of Lessig's favorite remix examples is the "Bush and Blair Love Song" which remixes images of President Bush and Tony Blair to make it appear as if they are lip-synching Lionel Richie's "Endless Love". "The message couldn't be more powerful: an emasculated Britain, as captured in the puppy love of its leader for Bush" (74). This remix in Lessig's eyes is exemplary of the power this type of expression holds - to not tell but show. Using preexisting images is vital to the art form because the production of meaning draws heavily on cultural reference an image or sound brings with it.

Their meaning comes not from the content of what they say; it comes from the reference, which is expressible only if it is the original that gets used.

Lessig describes the remix phenomenon instrumental in creating cultural literacy and a critical view of media and advertising that permeates our daily lives. But, as it stands today, copyright law will inhibit education employing these digital forms of literacy for institutions will shy away from use that might be deemed 'illegal'. Yet, Lessig reiterates, the remix form of expression cannot be killed, only criminalized.

== Commercial economies vs. sharing economies ==
In addition to describing two cultures Lessig also proposes two economies: the commercial and the sharing. The commercial economy is governed by the simple logic of the market, where products and services have a tangible economic value, be it money or labor. The Internet has been extremely successful as a portal for commercial economies to flourish - improving existing businesses and serving as a platform for thousands of new ones. It has been exceptionally fruitful of businesses that cater to a niche market - exemplified by such companies as Amazon and Netflix which provide a range of items that could not be accommodated by one physical space. This dynamic has been outlined by Wired''s editor in chief, Chris Anderson, in his book The Long Tail (book). Another obvious success story of a digital commercial economy is Google, which has managed to create value from value others have already created.

The sharing economy functions outside monetary exchange. We all belong to sharing economies - most obvious examples are our friendships and relationships. This economy is regulated not by a metric of price but by a set of social relations. Like the commercial economy, the sharing economy extends into the digital realm. Lessig's favorite example is Wikipedia itself. The top ten most visited website relies on user contribution - from creation to editing - for its content and gives no monetary incentive for this contribution. While providing the option of anonymity, the users of Wikipedia have been remarkably consistent with the site's suggestions - be it regarding consistent aesthetic or neutral point of view. A vital characteristic of a successful sharing economy is people are in it because they want to be.

== Hybrids ==
Lessig does a number of case studies of three types of successful hybrids.

=== Community spaces ===
Lessig cites sites such as Dogster, Craigslist, Flickr, and YouTube as successful internet community spaces that answer demand of the users who, in turn, reciprocate through sharing content and self-regulating by flagging inappropriate content. At the same time the sites make revenue through advertisements but are extremely careful to not overwhelm the users and disrupt the sense of community.

=== Collaboration spaces ===
Collaboration hybrids center on the belief of the users that they are working towards a common goal or building something together. Lessig's notable examples are volunteers of Usenet that help those technologically in need solve computer problems – from minor to complex. They are not paid or recognized by Microsoft yet they are instrumental in building value for the company. Similarly, Yahoo! Answers launched in December 2005 has gathered an enormous following of people answering other people's questions for free. They do not participate for any incentive other than to share their expertise and help others. In this category Lessig also cites the now infamous Heather Lawver 2000 case after the teenager started a fan site for J.K. Rowling's Harry Potter series, only to be constantly 'threatened' by Warner for illegal use of copyrighted content. Eight years later many large corporations have, at least in part, learned from Warner's mistake and Lawver's persuasive argument of the Potter Wars: fans are "a part of your marketing budget that you don't have to pay for". Thus lighter control of content use allows fans to share their appropriation of content while promoting it free. Everyone wins.

=== Communities ===
Lessig's third category lacks the 'spaces' qualification of the previous two because they create a community on a much grander, or more comprehensive scale. One such community is Second Life through which users can immerse themselves in a virtual environment and build a multi-faceted life not unlike real life but without the same limitations, while creating value by producing and sharing new codes for the program.

Lessig concludes that a feeling of ownership and contribution is vital to making hybrid communities function. These communities are not built on sacrifice but on mutual satisfaction in which both the consumer and producer benefit.

Parallel economies can coexist, the author insists, and are not mutually exclusive. In fact, crossover is not uncommon, particularly in the world of the Creative Commons which Lessig helped found. Many artists that have initially licensed their work under a CC license, that allowed others to share and remix their work as long as they were credited, have used the momentum from this visibility to crossover to the commercial economy.

Lessig warns that hybrid economies will do well to avoid what he calls sharecropping, that is corporations forcing the remixer to give up the right to his/her creation (providing they don't own the rights to all/some of its components) even if they plan to use their work for commercial purposes.

The hybrid that respects the rights of the creator - both the original creator and the remixer - is more likely to survive than the one that doesn't.

== Reforming copyright law ==
Lessig outlines five steps toward copyright reform.

1. Deregulating Amateur Activity. Primarily this means exempting noncommercial and, particularly amateur, use from the rights granted by copyright. In addition, this loosening of control will, in turn, remove some of the burden from the corporations' monitoring for misuse of their content.
2. Clear Title. As of now, there is no comprehensive and accessible registry that lists who owns rights to what. In addition to making the above clear, Lessig insists that author/owner should have to register their work in order to extend the copyright after a shorter period of time and for the work, otherwise, to enter public domain. He insists that this change would be instrumental to digital archiving and access for educational purposes.
3. Simplify. Building on his previous suggestions, Lessig insists that the system should be simplified. If a child is expected to comply with copyright law, they should be able to understand it.
4. Decriminalizing the Copy. As mentioned before the production of the 'copy' is a commonplace in daily transaction within the digital realm. If our daily activity triggers federal regulation on copyright law, it means that this regulation reaches too far. Thus the law must be rearticulated as to not include uses that are irrelevant to copyright owner's control.
5. Decriminalizing File Sharing. Lessig suggests this should be done either by "authorizing at least noncommercial file sharing with taxes to cover a reasonable royalty to the artists whose work is shared, or by authorizing a simple blanket licensing procedure, whereby users could, for a low fee, buy the right to freely file-share"

== Conclusion ==
In his final chapter "Reforming Us", Lessig insists that in order to move towards ending the senseless copyright wars, which are mostly harming our children, we must understand that governmental control has its limits.

The children growing up in a digital age are seeing these laws as senseless and corrupt and, more importantly, trivial as they continue to remix and download despite it. Lessig warns that this phenomenon can have a larger trickle-down effect towards a child's view of law in general. When put in this light, copyright reform carries much larger implications for the morality of the digital age generations.

Aside from morality of the generation, Lessig asserts that due to legislation being either too passive or too stern it creates the lack of understanding from policy makers. This assertion leads to the true meaning of fair use.

== In popular culture ==
On an episode of The Colbert Report with Lessig as a guest, Stephen Colbert made fun of the book's status under Creative Commons by taking a copy, signing it, and then proclaiming it the 'Colbert' edition for sale. Lessig laughed.

== See also ==
- Remix Culture
- An Army of Davids
- Free Culture
