= The Future of Ideas =

2001 book by Lawrence Lessig

- Author: Lawrence Lessig
- Publisher: Random House
- Publication date: 2001
- ISBN: 0-375-50578-4
- OCLC: 46969861
- Preceded by: Code and Other Laws of Cyberspace
- Followed by: Free Culture

The Future of Ideas: The Fate of the Commons in a Connected World (2001) is a book by Lawrence Lessig, at the time of writing a professor of law at Stanford Law School, who is well known as a critic of the extension of the copyright term in US. It is a continuation of his previous book Code and Other Laws of Cyberspace, which is about how computer programs can restrict freedom of ideas in cyberspace.

While copyright helps artists get rewarded for their work, Lessig warns that a copyright regime that is too strict and grants copyright for too long a period of time (e.g. the current US legal climate) can destroy innovation, as the future always builds on the past. Lessig also discusses recent movements by corporate interests to promote longer and tighter protection of intellectual property in three layers: the code layer, the content layer, and the physical layer.

The code layer is that which is controlled by computer programs. One instance is Internet censorship in mainland China by sorting out geographical IP addresses. The content layer is notoriously illustrated by Napster, a peer-to-peer file sharing service. Lessig criticizes the reaction of music companies and Hollywood. The physical layer is the one that actually conveys information from one point to another, and can be either wired or wireless. He discusses particularly the regulation of the radio spectrum in the United States.

In the end, he stresses the importance of existing works entering the public domain in a reasonably short period of time, as the Founding Fathers intended.

On 15 January 2008, Lessig announced on his blog that his publishers agreed to license the book under a Creative Commons Attribution-Noncommercial license, and the book in PDF format can be downloaded freely.

== Editions ==
- US 1st hardcover edition (Random House): ISBN 0-375-50578-4
- US paperback (Vintage books): ISBN 0-375-72644-6
- On-line version (PDF, free, under a Creative Commons Attribution-Noncommercial licence)
