= Kirby Ferguson =

Canadian filmmaker, writer, and speaker

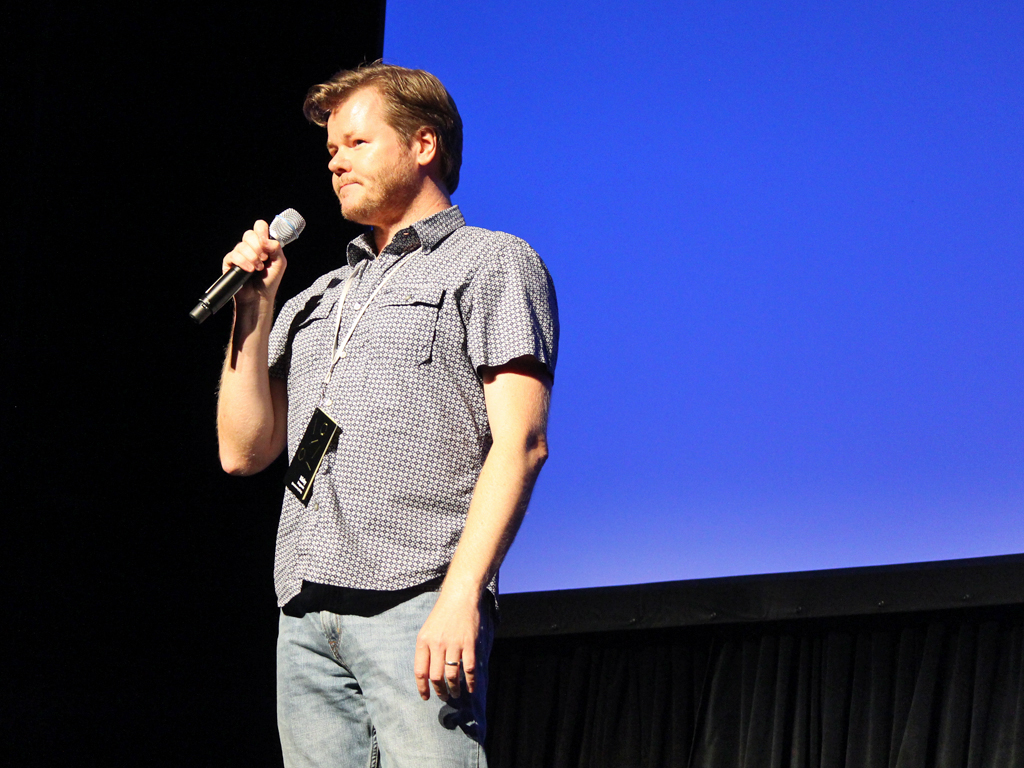
- Ferguson at XOXO 2015
- Years active: 2010–present
- Known for: Documentarian
- Website: kirbyferguson.com

Kirby Ferguson is a Canadian filmmaker, writer, and speaker whose work covers creative works and popular culture; particularly remix culture. He is best known for his documentary series Everything is a Remix and This is Not a Conspiracy Theory.

== Career ==
In 2010, Ferguson created the four-part web series Everything is a Remix, which discussed issues of fair use and how creative works derive inspiration from existing works. The inspiration for the series came from Ferguson seeing the media portray derivative works as taboo.

Defining remix culture, Ferguson states, "It's about whether or not you can recognize chunks of other people’s work. And if you look closely enough, every work contains pieces from previous works." Ferguson believes that creativity is based upon three elements: "copy, transform, and combine". These building blocks are the basis for all novel ideas. On the topic of music samples in popular music, Ferguson points out that the reuse and inspiration from other musical sources has happened since the early days of popular music. He argues that musicians have been doing this across genres and time, most clearly with the reuse of classical folk music in rock music.

In a follow-up to Everything is a Remix, Ferguson explored Star Wars: The Force Awakens as an example of remixing in popular culture. Ferguson's work led to a TED talk titled Embrace the Remix, which expands upon the ideas in Everything is a Remix.

Ferguson's second documentary series, This is Not a Conspiracy Theory, covers the culture and tools surrounding conspiracy theories.

From 2021-2022, he updated his "Everything is a Remix" series.

== Filmography ==
Years	Project	Credit
2010–2012	Everything is a Remix	writer, director, producer
2014–2018	This is Not a Conspiracy Theory	writer, director, producer
