= Recombinant culture =

Recombinant culture is when cultural productions such as television shows are rehashed in a series of sequels. The term was introduced by Todd Gitlin in 1983 to describe how in American television networks would create and promote sequels and spin-offs over original shows, with "hits" being very rare and "a blatant imitation stands a good chance of getting bigger numbers than a show that stands on its own". The phenomenon has been attributed to advertising-supported media. Examples include the Superman series. Positive examples of recombinant culture have included sampling in music.

== See also ==
- Culture – Social behavior and norms of a society
- Cultural bias – Interpretation and judgement of phenomena by the standards of one's culture
- Culture war – Conflict between cultural values
- Cultural dissonance – Sense of discord caused by a change in a cultural environment
- Cultural imperialism – Cultural aspects of imperialism
- Remix culture – Culture encouraging the creation of derivative works
