= Code and Other Laws of Cyberspace =

1999 book by Lawrence Lessig

- Author: Lawrence Lessig
- Publisher: Basic Books
- Publication date: 1999
- Pages: 297
- ISBN: 0-465-03912-X
- OCLC: 43836713
- Followed by: The Future of Ideas

Code and Other Laws of Cyberspace is a 1999 book by Lawrence Lessig on the structure and nature of regulation of the Internet.

== Summary ==
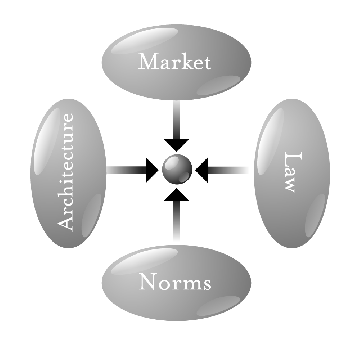
The pathetic dot theory

The primary idea of the book, as expressed in the title, is the notion that computer code (or "West Coast Code", referring to Silicon Valley) regulates conduct in much the same way that legal code (or "East Coast Code", referring to Washington, D.C.) does. More generally, Lessig argues that there are actually four major regulators (Law, Norms, Market, Architecture) each of which has a profound impact on society and whose implications must be considered (sometimes called the "pathetic dot theory", after the "dot" that is constrained by these regulators.)

The book includes a discussion of the implications for copyright law, arguing that cyberspace changes not only the technology of copying but also the power of law to protect against illegal copying. It goes so far as to argue that code displaces the balance in copyright law and doctrines such as fair use. If it becomes possible to license every aspect of use (by means of trusted systems created by code), no aspect of use would have the protection of fair use. The importance of this side of the story is generally underestimated and, as the examples in the book show, very often, code is even (only) considered as an extra tool to fight against "unlimited copying."

== Other books ==
The Future of Ideas is a continuation of Code's analysis of copyright, where Lessig argues that too much long term copyright protection hampers the creation of new ideas based on existing works, and advocates the importance of existing works entering the public domain quickly.

== Revision ==
In March 2005, Lessig launched the Code V.2 Wiki to update the book with current information, which he then adapted into a second edition of the book, Code: Version 2.0, in 2006.

== Influence ==
The book has been widely cited, and Lessig has repeatedly achieved top places on lists of most-cited law school faculty. It has been called "the most influential book to date about law and cyberspace", "seminal", and in a critical essay on the book's 10th anniversary, author Declan McCullagh (subject of the chapter "What Declan Doesn't Get") said it was "difficult to overstate the influence" of the book.

== See also ==
- Cyberspace
- Digital rights management
- Government by algorithm
- Information society
- Free Culture
- Internet and Technology Law Desk Reference
