= Free Culture (book) =

Book by Lawrence Lessig

- Original cover
- Author: Lawrence Lessig
- Language: English
- Genre: Non-fiction
- Publisher: Penguin Press
- Publication date: 2004
- Publication place: United States
- Media type: Print (Hardcover and Paperback)
- ISBN: 978-1-59420-006-9
- Preceded by: The Future of Ideas
- Followed by: Code: Version 2.0

Free Culture: How Big Media Uses Technology and the Law to Lock Down Culture and Control Creativity (published in paperback as Free Culture: The Nature and Future of Creativity) is a 2004 book by law professor Lawrence Lessig that was released on the Internet under the Creative Commons Attribution/Non-commercial license on March 25, 2004.

This book documents how copyright power has expanded substantially since 1974 in five critical dimensions:

- duration (from 32 to 95 years),
- scope (from publishers to virtually everyone),
- reach (to every view on a computer),
- control (including "derivative works" defined so broadly that virtually any new content could be sued by some copyright holder as a "derivative work" of something), and
- concentration and integration of the media industry.

It also documents how this industry has successfully used the legal system to limit competition to the major media corporations through legal action against:

- College students for close to $100 billion, because their improvements of search engines made it easier for people in a university intranet to find copyrighted music placed by others in their "public" folder.
- Lawyers who advised MP3.com that they had reasonable grounds to believe streaming an MP3 uploaded by a customer only to computers that the customer has logged-in on for the service is legal, and
- Venture capitalists who funded Napster.

The result is a legal and economic environment that stifles "the Progress of Science and useful Arts", exactly the opposite of the purpose cited in the US Constitution. It may not be possible today to produce another Mickey Mouse, because many of its early cartoon themes might be considered "derivative works" of some existing copyrighted material (as indicated in the subtitle to the hardback edition and in numerous examples in this book).

== Summary ==
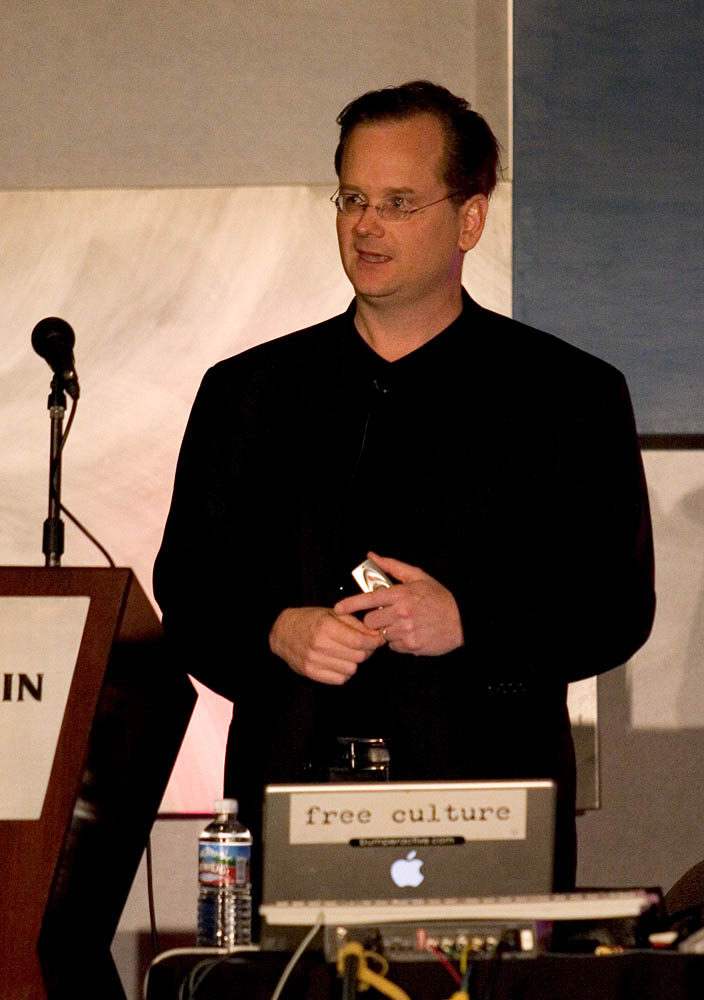
The law professor Lawrence Lessig

This book is an outgrowth of the U.S. Supreme Court decision in Eldred v. Ashcroft, which Lessig lost. Article I, Section 8, Clause 8 of the U.S. Constitution says, "The Congress shall have Power... to promote the Progress of Science and useful Arts, by securing for limited Times to Authors and Inventors the exclusive Right to their respective Writings and Discoveries." Several times in the past century, Congress has extended the copyright law in several ways. One way was to extend the term "on the installment plan". Another was to broaden the scope to include not only copying but creating "derivative works". This latter broadening is so ambiguous that it provides a foundation for massive abuse of power by companies holding large copyright portfolios. For example, the Recording Industry Association of America sued a freshman at Rensselaer Polytechnic Institute (RPI) for $12,000 for improving a search engine used only inside RPI. Lessig cites another example where Fox demanded $10,000 for the rights to use a 4.5 second video clip with The Simpsons playing on a television in a corner of a scene in a documentary. Anyone producing a collage of video clips can potentially be similarly sued on the grounds the collage is a "derivative work" of something copyrighted or that the collage contains a shot that is copyrighted. Lessig argues that this substantially limits the growth of creative arts and culture, in violation of the US Constitution; the Supreme Court ruled that Congress has the constitutional authority to properly balance competing interests on cases like this.

In the preface of Free Culture, Lessig compares this book with a previous book of his, Code and Other Laws of Cyberspace, which propounded that software has the effect of law. Free Culture's message is different, Lessig writes, because it is "about the consequence of the Internet to a part of our tradition that is much more fundamental, and, as hard as this is for a geek-wanna-be to admit, much more important." (pg. xiv)

Professor Lessig analyzes the tension that exists between the concepts of piracy and property in the intellectual property realm in the context of what he calls the present "depressingly compromised process of making law" that has been captured in most nations by multinational corporations that are interested in the accumulation of capital and not the free exchange of ideas.

The book also chronicles his prosecution of Eldred and his attempt to develop the Eldred Act, also known as the Public Domain Enhancement Act or the Copyright Deregulation Act.

Lessig concludes his book by suggesting that as society evolves into an information society there is a choice to be made to decide if that society is to be free or feudal in nature. In his afterword he suggests that free software pioneer Richard Stallman and the Free Software Foundation model of making content available is not against the capitalist approach that has allowed such corporate models as Westlaw and LexisNexis to have subscribers to pay for materials that are essentially in the public domain but with underlying licenses like those created by his organization Creative Commons.

He also argues for the creation of shorter renewable periods of copyright and a limitation on derivative rights, such as limiting a publisher's ability to stop the publication of copies of an author's book on the internet for non-commercial purposes or create a compulsory licensing scheme to ensure that creators obtain direct royalties for their works based upon their usage statistics and some kind of taxation scheme such as suggested by professor William Fisher of Harvard Law School that is similar to a longstanding proposal of Richard Stallman.

== Themes ==
=== Introduction and identification of a cultural shift ===
Lessig defines "free culture" as analogous to "free speech" – that is, unrestricted. A free culture supports and protects its creators and innovators directly and indirectly. It directly supports creators and innovators by granting intellectual property rights. It indirectly supports them by ensuring that follow-on creators and innovators remain as free as possible from the creators of the past by limiting how extensive intellectual property rights are. A "permission culture" is the opposite of a free culture; in a permission culture, creators and innovators are only able to create and innovate with the permission of creators of the past – whether they are powerful creators or not.

Lessig presents two examples that provide some insight into the nature of these dueling cultures. In the first, an example of "free culture", he describes how aircraft operators did not have to abide by an old law that land owners also owned the air above the property and thus could forbid overflight. In the second, an example of a "permission culture", he describes how David Sarnoff, president of RCA, managed to persuade the United States government to delay the deployment of the rival wideband FM radio, invented by Edwin Howard Armstrong. He describes this as an example of how the inventor of a new invention can be forced to request "permission" from a previous inventor.

The disparate features of a free culture and a permission culture affect how culture is made. In a free culture, innovators are able to create – and build upon past creations – without the worry of infringing upon intellectual property rights. In a permission culture, innovators must first request "permission" from past creators in order to build upon or modify past creations. Oftentimes, the innovator must pay the past creator in order to obtain the permission needed to proceed. If the past creator refuses to grant permission to the innovator, the past creator may appeal to the government to enforce their intellectual property rights. Typically, intellectual property rights protect culture that is produced and sold, or made to be sold. This type of culture is "commercial culture", and the focus of the law is typically on commercial creativity rather than "non-commercial activity". Initially, the law, "protected the incentives of creators by granting them exclusive rights to their creative work, so that they could sell those exclusive rights in a commercial marketplace." This protection has become far more extensive, as is evinced in the Armstrong/RCA example.

Lessig argues that the United States is rapidly becoming a permission culture, though he sees the internet as a modern-day Armstrong: it challenges the traditional innovator and seeks to break free of any permissions or strict regulations. The internet can provide a vastly more vibrant and competitive innovation culture, and this is troublesome for any large corporations that have invested in fortifying their intellectual property rights: "Corporations threatened by the potential of the internet to change the way both commercial and noncommercial culture are made and shared have united to induce lawmakers to use the law to protect them." The internet has facilitated the mass production of culture, both commercial and noncommercial. Corporations that had traditionally controlled this production have reacted by pressuring legislators to change the laws to protect their interests. The protection that these corporations seek is not protection for the creators, but rather protection against certain forms of business that directly threaten them. Lessig's worry is that intellectual property rights will not be protecting the right sort of property, but will instead come to protect private interests in a controlling way. He writes that the First Amendment protects creators against state control and copyright law, when properly balanced, protects creators against private control. Expansive intellectual property rights stands to dramatically increase all regulations on creativity in America, stifling innovation by requiring innovators to request permission prior to their creative work.

Free Culture covers the themes of piracy and property. Lessig writes at the end of the preface, "... the free culture that I defend in this book is a balance between anarchy and control. A free culture, like a free market, is filled with property. It is filled with rules of property and contract that get enforced by the state. But just as a free market is perverted if its property becomes feudal, so too can a free culture be queered by extremism in the property rights that define it."

=== Piracy ===
"How free is this culture?" According to Lessig, the United States has been but is decreasingly a free culture. Free cultures leave content open for expansion by others. Purportedly, this is not a new practice, but one that is increasingly challenged, mostly for economic reasons by creators and industry. The conflict or "war against piracy" emerges from efforts to regulate creative property in order to delimit the use of creative property without permission. As Lessig sees it, "the law's role is less and less to support creativity, and more and more to protect certain industries against competition."

This new role of law is meant to protect copyright owners from "pirates" who share their content for free, effectively "robbing" the creator of any profit. Lessig acknowledges piracy is wrong and deserving of punishment, however he is concerned the concept, as it appears in the context of "internet piracy", has been used inappropriately. This problematic conception follows a certain chain of reasoning: creative work has value; when an individual uses, takes or builds upon someone else's creative work they are appropriating something of value from the creator. If someone appropriates something of value from a creator without the creator's expressed permission, then that someone is "pirating" the creator's work, and this is wrong. Rochelle Dreyfuss, an NYU Professor of Law, has termed this conception of piracy the "if value, then right" theory of creative property – namely, "if there is value, then someone must have a right to that value."

First defining and then pointedly critiquing a prevalent "if value, then right" notion of creative property, Lessig emphasizes that American law recognizes intellectual property as an instrument. Lessig points out that if "if value, then right" is correct, then film, recorded music, radio, and cable TV each is built on a history of piracy. Lessig details the history of these four "pirates" as examples of how pervasive has been the practice of making use of others' creative property without permission. Importantly, Lessig points out, throughout human history, "every society has left a certain bit of its culture free for the taking." This free culture has historically been deliberate, and widely appreciated. In fact, "creators here and everywhere are always and at all times building upon the creativity that went before and that surrounds them now."

Lessig goes on to suggest that the advent of the Internet has changed culture, and along with it the expectation and acceptance of creative piracy. In particular, the internet has brought about a war against piracy. At the heart of the issue is a question about the reach, benefit, and burden of copyright law. The internet challenges the "natural limit to the reach of the law", and therein lies the quandary. The presence of the internet instigates and fans the flames of the piracy war by virtue of its inherent ability to very quickly and indiscriminately spread content.

Lessig states that "even if some piracy is plainly wrong, not all 'piracy' is." Finding the balance is, has been, and needs to continue to be the process of U.S. law; internet use, as exemplified by peer-to-peer file sharing, pushes the envelope.

For centuries, copyright holders have complained about "piracy". In 1996, the American Society of Composers, Authors and Publishers (ASCAP) sued "the Girl Scouts for failing to pay for the songs that girls sang around Girl Scout campfires." The suit was a public relations disaster for ASCAP, and they dropped the suit. However, the law still remains: If you sing a copyrighted song in public, you are legally required to pay the copyright holder.

Copyright law has also been extended to threaten the very creativity that is a central value of our society, burdening it "with insanely complex and vague rules and with the threat of obscenely severe penalties." Copyright law at its birth only protected inappropriate copying. Today it also covers

"building upon or transforming that work... [W]hen the law regulates as broadly and obscurely as it does, the extension matters a lot. The burden of this law now vastly outweighs any original benefit... [T]he law's role is less and less to support creativity, and more and more to protect certain industries against competition."

=== Property ===
Lessig explains that copyright is a kind of property, but that it is an odd kind of property for which the term can sometimes be misleading – the difference between taking a table and taking a good idea, for example, is hard to see under the term 'property'. As late as 1774, publishers believed a copyright was forever. A copyright at that time was more limited than it is today, only prohibiting others from reprinting a book; it did not cover, as today, other rights over performance, derivative works, etc. Modern technology allows people to copy or cut and paste video clips in creative new ways to produce art, entertainment, and new modes of expression and communication that didn't exist before. The resulting potential for media literacy could help ordinary people not only communicate their concerns better but also make it easier for them to understand when they are being suckered into things not in their interests. However, current copyright law effectively restricts the use of this to very wealthy individuals and corporations for two reasons: (1) the vagueness of "fair use". (2) The costs of negotiating legal rights for the creative reuse of content are astronomically high. "You either pay a lawyer to defend your fair use rights or pay a lawyer to track down permissions so you don't have to rely on fair use rights."

Drawing on an argument Lessig made in Code and Other Laws of Cyberspace he applies the model of four different modalities of regulation that support or weaken a given right or regulation. The four means of regulation are law, market, architecture and norms. These four modalities constrain the target group or individual in different ways, and law tends to function as an umbrella over the other methods. These constraints can be changed, also a restriction imposed by one constraint may allow freedoms from another. Lessig maintains that before the internet these constraints remained in balance with each other in regulating copying of creative works.

However, government support of established companies with an older form of doing business would preclude innovation induced competition and overall progress. Lessig says it best ' it is the special duty of policy makers to guarantee that that protection not become a deterrent to progress' He specifies that his argument is not about justification of protection of copyrights but the effects of changing the law regarding copyright in the face of the internet. In this regard he brings the example of the unforeseen effects on the environment of using the chemical pesticide DDT despite its initial promise for commercial agriculture. Following this allusion he calls for an almost environmentalist awareness for the future of the creative environment.

Copyright has changed from covering just books, maps and charts to any work today that has a tangible form including music to architecture and drama and software. Today, it gives the copyright holder the exclusive right to publish the work and control over any copies of the work as well as any derivative work. Additionally, there is no requirement to register a work to get a copyright; it is automatic, whether or not a copy is made available for others to copy. Copyright law does not distinguish between transformative use of a work and duplication or piracy. The change in copyright scope today means law regulates publishers, users, and authors, simply because they are all capable of making copies. Before the internet, copies of any work were the trigger for copyright law, but Lessig raises the point of whether copies should always be the trigger, especially when considering the way digital media sharing works.

In 1831, the term of copyright increased from a maximum of 28 years to a maximum of 42; in 1909 the renewal term was extended from 14 years to 28. Beginning in 1962, the term of existing copyright was extended eleven times in the last 40 years. After 1976, any works created were subject to only one term of copyright, the maximum term, which was the life of the author plus fifty years, or seventy five years for corporations. According to Lessig, the public domain becomes orphaned by these changes to copyright law. In the past thirty years the average term has tripled and has gone from about 33 years to 95.

There are uses of copyrighted material that may involve copying that do not invoke copyright law; these are deemed fair uses. Fair use law denies the owner any exclusive right over such fair uses for public policy. The internet shifts the use of digital creative property, to one that is now regulated under copyright law. There is almost no use that is presumptively unregulated.

Relatively recent changes in technology and copyright law have dramatically expanded the impact of copyright in five different dimensions:

- The duration increased from an average of 32.2 years to 95 (for copyrights owned by corporations) between 1974 and 2004, and it may yet be extended further, in violation of the constitutional requirement that the exclusive rights be "for limited times".
- The scope has increased from regulating only publishers to now regulating just about everyone.
- The reach has expanded, because computers make copies with every view, and these copies are presumptively regulated.
- The control the copyright holder has over use has expanded dramatically, using the Digital Millennium Copyright Act to prosecute people with software that could defeat the limits built into the code used to distribute the product. The latter may limit how many times a person can view the material, whether copy and paste is allowed, whether and how much can be printed, and whether the copy can be loaned or given to anyone else.
- Increases in the concentration and integration [of] media ownership provides unprecedented control over political discourse and the evolution of culture. "[F]ive companies control 85 percent of our media sources... [F]our companies control 90 percent of the nation's radio advertising revenues... [T]en companies control half of the nation's [newspapers]... [T]en film studios receive 99 percent of all film revenue. The ten largest cable companies account for 85 percent of all cable revenue."

Lessig argues that some of these changes benefited society as a whole. However, the combined effects of the changes in these five dimensions has been to restrict, rather than promote, the progress of science and useful arts, in apparent violation of the constitutional justification for copyright law. The negative impact on creativity can be seen in numerous examples throughout this book. An example of its impact on political discourse is the refusal by the major TV networks to run ads critical of the Bush administration's claims of Saddam Hussein's weapons of mass destruction during the period prior to the U.S. invasion of Iraq in 2003, enforced by Supreme Court decisions that give stations the right to choose what they will and will not run. Lessig claims this kind of environment is not democratic, and at no point in our history have people had fewer "legal right[s] to control more of the development of our culture than now."

== Outline ==
The following summarizes the different sections of the book.

=== Preface ===
Lessig insists that the future of society is being threatened by recent changes in US law and administration, including decisions by the US Federal Communications Commission that allow increased Concentration of media ownership. Lessig claims to defend a free culture that is balanced between control – a culture that has property, rules, and contracts pertaining to property that are enforced by the state — and anarchy — a culture that can grow and thrive when others are allowed to use and build upon the property of others. However, this culture can become puzzling and perplexing when the extremism about property rights begins to mimic the feudal property of a free market.

=== Introduction ===
Lessig provides two examples that portray the difference between a free culture and a permissions culture — two themes that will develop throughout the book. (See Introduction and Identification of cultural Shift)

==== Chapter 1. Creators ====
Lessig devotes the first chapter to defining creators as 'copycats' who borrow and "build upon the creativity that went before and that surrounds them now ... partially done without permission and without compensating the original creator." Throughout the chapter Lessig develops on a theme that "all cultures are free to some degree," by expounding on key examples from the American and Japanese cultures, namely Disney and doujinshi comics, respectively.

The first commercial success of Mickey Mouse came with Steamboat Willie, released in 1928. In part, it parodied the silent film Steamboat Bill, Jr., released earlier that year by Buster Keaton. Under current US law, Steamboat Willie might be challenged for copyright violation as a "derivative work" of Steamboat Bill, Jr. However, under copyright laws in 1928, this type of cultural production was unproblematic. This change has had a chilling effect on creativity, serving to reduce competition to the established media companies, as suggested by the subtitle to the original hardback edition of Free Culture.

Similarly, in the vigorous Japanese comic market, where "Some 40 percent of publications are comics, and 30 percent of publication revenue derives from comics", one main driving force is 'doujinshi', which is a kind of copycat technique. However, to qualify as doujinshi, "the artist must make a contribution to the art he copies ... Doujinshi are plainly 'derivative works.'" The doujinshi artists almost never get the permission of those who own the works they modify, though their work is seen to contribute to the overall cultural production.

The doujinshi market operates alongside Japan's mainstream comic industry, with both markets maintaining relationship with derivative works can contributbe to the visibility of original publications. Although the maket frequently incorporates copyrighted material with autorization, the practice has generally been tolerated by mainstream publishers.

Lessig concludes with a thought that "ours was a free culture [that] is becoming much less so." So, would the US have a more vibrant industry in creating comics if the law were not used as often here to punish and intimidate small competitors to the big business producing comics?

==== Chapter 2. "Mere Copyists" ====
Chapter 2 is a discussion about the influence of technology on culture, and the legal environment that impacts its reach. Lessig recounts George Eastman's invention of Kodak as a technology that advanced the invention of photography, and brought about significant social change by giving the average citizen access to what began as an elite form of expression. Lessig traces the simultaneous legal environment that permitted its genius: Given the challenge of deciding whether photographers would need to get permission before taking aim, the legal system decided "in favor of the pirates ... Freedom was the default."

Lessig presses to suggest that, had the legal atmosphere been different, "nothing like the growth in a democratic technology of expression would have been realized." Democracy of expression is a main theme for this chapter, as Lessig examines various examples of the technologies that are developed to promote so-called "media literacy", the understanding and active use of media for learning, living, and communicating in the twenty-first century; he describes media literacy as a tool for empowering minds and reversing the digital divide.

The Internet is introduced as a prime example of a technology that develops the culture. For Lessig, the Internet is a "mix of captured images, sound, and commentary [that] can be widely spread practically instantaneously." With e-mail and blogging, the Internet creates a dimension for democracy of speech that is widespread and far-reaching. Lessig's lament is that the freedom that the Internet and similar technologies offer is increasingly challenged by the restrictions that are placed upon them through laws that "close down that technology."

==== Chapter 3. Catalogs ====
In chapter 3, Lessing shares an account of Jesse Jordan, a 2002 freshman at Rensselaer Polytechnic Institute (RPI) who made a significant contribution to the free culture debate through tinkering to develop a search engine which indexed pictures, research, notes, movie clips and a variety of other RPI network materials. When the Recording Industry Association of America (RIAA) sued Jesse (and three other students) for piracy, forcing him into a settlement that cost him all of his $12,000 savings, Jesse became an activist for free culture.

==== Chapter 4. "Pirates" ====
In chapter 4 Lessig advises that "the history of the content industry is a history of piracy. Every important sector of the 'big media' today — film, records, radio, and cable TV — was born of a kind of piracy so defined." This includes the film industry of Hollywood who used piracy in order to escape the controls of Thomas Edison's patents. Similarly, the record industry grew out of piracy due to a loophole in the law permitting composers exclusivity to copies of their music and its public performance, but not over reproduction via the new phonograph and player piano technologies. Radio also grew out of piracy since the radio industry is not required to compensate recording artists for playing their works. As such, "the law gives the radio station the right to take something for nothing," though radio is required to pay the composer. Cable TV is yet another example of big media that grew out of piracy. For decades, cable companies were not required to pay for their broadcast content. As in the case with recorded music, law ultimately settled this score by setting a price at which cable companies would pay copyright holders for their content.

According to Lessig, "every industry affected by copyright today is the product and beneficiary of a certain kind of piracy ... Every generation welcomes the pirates from the last ... until now."

==== Chapter 5. "Piracy" ====
Lessig contextualizes piracy, noting that "even if some piracy is plainly wrong, not all 'piracy' is ... Many kinds of 'piracy' are useful and productive ... Neither our tradition nor any tradition has ever banned all 'piracy'."

Lessig compares the examples of piracy that were previously treated:

Case	Whose value was 'pirated'	Response of the courts	Response of Congress
Recordings	Composers	No protection	Statutory license
Radio	Recording artists	N/A	Nothing
Cable TV	Broadcasters	No protection	Statutory license
VCR	Film creators	No protection	Nothing

Bringing the discussion to an up-to-date example, Lessig gives an overview of Napster peer-to-peer (p2p) sharing and outlines benefits and harms of this kind of piracy through sharing. He cautions that laws should be tempered according to how much benefit and how harm such sharing might cause. According to Lessig, "[t]he question is a matter of balance. The law should seek that balance ..."

Lessig emphasizes the role of copyright law, pointing out that as it stands, copyright law impacts all kinds of piracy, and hence is a part of the piracy war that challenges free culture. On the one hand, copyright supporters indiscriminately recognize cultural content as sharing the same attributes as tangible property. On the other hand, creators shun the notion of having their intellectual property at the disposal of pirates, and so agree to delimit commonality through strict copyright laws. Ultimately, Lessig calls for changes in US copyright law that balance the support of intellectual property with cultural freedom.

=== "Property" ===
A copyright is an odd kind of property, because it limits free use of ideas and expression. Chapters 6–9 offer four stories to help illustrate what it means to say that a copyright is property.

==== Chapter 6. Founders ====
In the majority of European countries, copyright law began with the efforts of spiritual and temporal authorities to control the production of printers. This was often done by granting monopolies. "Henry VIII granted a patent to print the bible". In England, the Crown's practice of handing out monopolies became quite unpopular and was one of the issues that motivated the English Civil War of 1642–1651.

As late as 1774, publishers believed a copyright was forever. This was in spite of the fact that "[t]he Statute of Anne [of 1710 tried to limit this by declaring] that all published works would get a copyright term of fourteen years, renewable once if the author was alive, and that all works already published ... would get a single term of twenty-one additional years." (A copyright at that time was more limited than it is today, only prohibiting others from reprinting a book; it did not cover, as today, other rights over performance, derivative works, etc.) In spite of the Statute of Anne, publishers still insisted they had a perpetual copyright under common law. This claim was controversial. "Many believed the power the [publishers] exercised over the spread of knowledge was harming that spread". In 1774 the House of Lords, functioning like the Supreme Court of the United States today determined that in granting a copyright, "The state would protect the exclusive right [to publish], but only so long as it benefited society." "After 1774, the public domain was born."

==== Chapter 7. Recorders ====
A film made by Jon Else in 1990 includes a 4.5 second segment with a television in a corner playing The Simpsons. Before releasing the film, Else contacted The Simpsons's creator, Matt Groening for copyright permission. Groening agreed but asked Else to contact the producer, Gracie Films. They agreed but asked Else to contact their parent company, Fox. When he contacted Fox, someone there claimed that Groening didn't own The Simpsons, and Fox wanted $10,000 to allow him to distribute his documentary with The Simpsons playing in the background of a 4.5 second scene about something else. "Else was sure there was a mistake. He worked his way up to someone he thought was a vice president for licensing, Rebecca Herrera. She confirmed that copyright permission would cost $10,000 for that 4.5 second clip in the corner of a shot, and added, "And if you quote me, I'll turn you over to our attorneys."

==== Chapter 8. Transformers ====
In 1993, Starwave, Inc., produced a retrospective on compact disc (CD-ROM) of the career of Clint Eastwood, who had made over 50 films as an actor and director. The retrospective included short excerpts from each of Eastwood's films. Because this was not obviously "fair use", they needed to get clear rights from anyone who might have a copyright claim to those film clips, actors, composers, musicians, etc. CD was a new technology, not mentioned in any of the original contracts with the people involved. The standard rate at that time for that kind of use of less than a minute of film was about $600. A year later, they had collected signatures from everyone they could identify in the clips they had chosen, "and even then we weren't sure whether we were totally in the clear."

Similarly, in "2003, DreamWorks Studios announced an agreement with Mike Myers and Austin Powers [to] acquire the rights to existing motion picture hits and classics, write new story-lines and — with the use of state-of-the-art digital technology — insert Myers and other actors into the film, thereby creating an entirely new piece of entertainment."

These two examples expose a major threat to the creativity of our society: Modern technology allows people to copy or cut and paste video clips in creative new ways to produce art, entertainment, and new modes of expression and communication that didn't exist before. The resulting potential for media literacy could help ordinary people not only communicate their concerns better but also make it easier for them to understand when they are being suckered into things not in their interests (as indicated in chapter 2 of this book). However, current copyright law effectively restricts the use of this to very wealthy individuals and corporations for two reasons: (1) the vagueness of "fair use". (2) The costs of negotiating legal rights for the creative reuse of content are astronomically high. "You either pay a lawyer to defend your fair use rights or pay a lawyer to track down permissions so you don't have to rely on fair use rights."

==== Chapter 9. Collectors ====
Lessig complained, "While much of twentieth-century culture was constructed through television, only a tiny portion of that culture is available for anyone to see today." Lessig suggests that this is a violation of the spirit of the Constitution: Early American copyright law required copyright owners to deposit copies of their work in libraries. "These copies were intended both to facilitate the spread of knowledge and to assure that a copy of the work would be around once the copyright expired".

However, starting with film in 1915 the government has allowed copyright holders to avoid depositing a copy permanently with the Library of Congress. As a result, most of the copyrighted material from the twentieth century is unavailable to the public in any form.

This is starting to change. In 1996 Brewster Kahle founded the Internet Archive, a non-profit digital library to provide "universal access to all knowledge".

However, congress continues to extend the copyright period. In 1790, a copyright lasted 14 years, and owners could get a 14-year extension for a fee. Since then, the copyright period was extended in 1831, 1909, 1954, 1971, 1976, 1988, 1992, 1994, and 1998. The media industry that got the previous extensions can be expected to try for yet another extension.

==== Chapter 10. "Property" ====
Chapter 10 examines the relatively recent changes in technology and copyright law have dramatically expanded the impact of copyright in five different dimensions: Duration, Scope, Reach, Control, Concentration.

=== Puzzles ===
==== Chapter 11. Chimera ====
A chimera is an animal (e.g., human) with double the standard DNA formed by the fusion of two embryos. Chimeras were discovered when genetic testing of mothers failed to match the DNA of a child. Further testing revealed that the chimeric mothers had two sets of DNA.

[In] "the copyright wars," ... we're dealing with a chimera ... [I]n the battle over ... "What is p2p sharing?" both sides have it right, and both sides have it wrong. One side says, "File sharing is just like two kids taping each other's records ..." That's true, at least in part ... But the description is also false in part ... [M]y p2p network [gives anyone] access to my music ... [I]t stretches the meaning of "friends" beyond recognition to say "my ten thousand best friends".

The section then goes on to describe how, according to the RIAA, downloading a CD could leave you liable for damages of one and a half million dollars. Lessig then suggests that content owners are gaining a level of control they never previously had.

==== Chapter 12. Harms ====
In this chapter Lessig describes three consequences of what he terms a "war". This war has been launched by the content industry to protect "property".

Constraining Creators: This section explores how the current law makes the use of new digital technologies, such as e-mailing a Comedy Central clips, "presumptively illegal". He goes on to describe how it is impossible to determine where the line between legal and illegal lies but that the consequences of crossing the line can be extreme, such in the case of four college students threatened with a $98 billion lawsuit by RIAA. He states "[F]air use in America simply means the right to hire a lawyer ..."

Constraining Innovators: In this section Lessig describes how innovators are being constrained, and amongst the examples he uses he gives the company MP3.com. In 2000 this company launched a service that would allow users to have a "lockbox" to which they could upload their music and access it anywhere. Shortly after the service was launched several major record companies sued the company and judgement was later entered for Vivendi against MP3.com. A year later Vivendi bought MP3.com. He also describes how innovators are hampered both the uncertainty in the law and the content industry's attempt to use to law to regulate the internet in an attempt to protect their interests. Also in this section he describes how, when new technologies are invented, Congress has attempted to strike a balance so as to protect these new technologies from the older ones. He suggests that this balance has now changed and uses as an example Internet radio which he suggests has been burdened by regulations and royalty payments that broadcasters have not been.

Corrupting Citizens: Here Lessig describes how, according to the New York Times 43 million Americans had downloaded music in 2002, thus making 20 percent of Americans criminals.

=== Balances ===
==== Chapter 13. Eldred ====
This chapter summarizes Eldred v. Ashcroft. The lead petitioner, Eric Eldred, wanted to make public domain works freely available on the Internet. He was particularly interested in a work that was slated to pass into the public domain in 1998. However, the Sonny Bono Copyright Term Extension Act (CTEA) meant that this work would not be in the public domain until 2019 – and not even then if Congress extended the term again, as it had eleven times since 1962. Further extension seems likely, because it makes good business sense for organizations owning old works that still generate revenue to spend a portion of that money on campaign contributions and lobbying to extend the terms even further. "Copyrights have not expired, and will not expire, so long as Congress is free to be bought to extend them again.

Lead counsel in Eldred v. Ashcroft was Lessig. He lost this case due, he says, to a strategic blunder in arguing that repeated extensions effectively granted perpetual copyright in violation of the constitutional specification that copyrights and patents be "for limited times".

This was a high-profile case, and many different groups had filed briefs.

[T]he Nashville Songwriters Association wrote that the public domain was nothing more than 'legal piracy.'

One "brief was signed by seventeen economists, including five Nobel Prize winners ... [spanning] the political spectrum. Their conclusions were powerful: There was no plausible claim that extending the terms of existing copyrights would do anything to increase incentives to create. Such extensions were nothing more than “rent-seeking” - the fancy term economists use to describe special-interest legislation gone wild."

Lessig believes that if he had instead argued that this extension caused net harm to the US economy and culture, as numerous people had advised, he could have won. Lessig insists that, "The real harm is to the works that are not famous, not commercially exploited, and no longer available as a result."

The structure of current law makes it exceedingly difficult for someone who might want to do something with an old work to find the copyright owner, because no central list exists. Because these old works no longer seem commercially viable to the copyright holder, many are deteriorating. Many old "films were produced on nitrate-based stock, and nitrate stock dissolves over time. They will be gone, and the metal canisters in which they are now stored will be filled with nothing more than dust."

=== Conclusion ===
In conclusion, Lessig uses the disproportionate number of HIV and AIDS victims in Africa and other poor countries to further his argument that the current control of intellectual property—in this case, patents to HIV drugs—defy "common sense." AIDS is no longer a mortal illness for individuals who can afford between $10,000 and $15,000 per year, but few in poor countries can afford this. Lessig cites drug company lobbying in the U.S. to prevent reduced prices for their drugs in Africa, but he holds the government and society responsible for failing to "revolt" against this injustice. In 1997 the US government threatened South Africa with possible trade sanctions if it attempted to obtain the drugs at the price at which they were available in these few other poor countries. In response, Lessig calls for a "sensible patent policy" that could support the patent system but enable flexibility in distribution, a "sense of balance" he says once existed historically but has now been lost. He supports the rights of companies to charge whatever they want for innovative products, but says we need patents to encourage others to invest in the research needed to develop such products. He points out, however, that offering AIDS drugs at a much reduced price in Africa would not directly impact the profits of pharmaceutical companies.

=== Afterword ===
In the afterword, Lessig proposes practical solutions to the dispute over intellectual property rights, in hope that common sense and a proclivity toward free culture be revived. His ideas include emulating the structure of the Creative Commons in complement to copyright; invoking more formalities for in the exercise of creativity online (marking copyrighted work, registering copyrights, and renewing claims to copyright); limiting the role of the Copyright Office in developing marking systems; shorter copyright terms (enough to incentivize creativity, but no more) and simpler language; and moving the concerns of copyright out of the purview of expensive lawyers and more into public sphere.

The balance of this book maps out what might be done about the problems described earlier. This is divided into two parts: what anyone can do now and what requires help from lawmakers.

Us, Now: If current trends continue, 'cut and paste' will become 'get permission to cut and paste'.

Them, Soon: This chapter outlines five kinds of changes in law suggested by the analysis of this book.

1. More Formalities: It is suggested that all copyright work should be registered so as to lower the costs involved in obtaining the rights to a work. He further suggests that until a work has a complainant copyright notice the work should be usable by anyone.

2. Shorter Terms In this section it is proposed that copyright terms should be shorter. Although not suggesting an actual time Lessig does suggest four principles of any copyright term:

It should be (1) short, (2) simple, (3) alive (i.e., require a renewal), and (4) prospective (i.e., do not authorize retrospective extension).

3. Free Use Vs. Fair Use: Lessig suggests that what constitutes a derivative work should be narrowed.

4. Liberate the Music —Again: Here Lessig argues that the law on file-sharing music should be reformed and that any reform that attempts to limit file sharing in lieu of purchasing must also ensure it does not hamper the sharing of free content. He also suggests a law should be developed that allows the sharing of music no longer available in other media but ensure artists still receive a small royalty.

5. Fire Lots of Lawyers: Lessig opines that the costs involved in the legal system are too high and that it only works effectively for the top 1% and that a cheaper system would be more just.

== Critical reception ==
=== In news media ===
In a review in The New York Times, Adam Cohen found Free Culture to be a "powerfully argued and important analysis," where Lessig argues persuasively that we are in a crisis of cultural impoverishment. However, he says that "after taking us to this point, 300 pages into his analysis," Lessig "fails to deliver," and his proposals are both "impractical and politically unattainable."

David Post in Reason argued that Lessig shows that "free culture" has always been a part of our intellectual heritage and illuminates the tension between the already created and not yet created. Although Post generally agrees with Lessig's argument, he does point out that copyrights are property rights, arguing "property rights are, as a general rule, a good thing" and that Lessig does not do enough in his book to address this side of the debate.

=== In academia ===
Stuart Weinstein and Charles Wild reviewed the book for the International Review of Law Computers & Technology. They wrote that Lessig's claim that "the Internet and intellectual property law are being used by powerful media forces as a tool for suppressing creativity in the pursuit of pure economic benefit" is too bleak and perhaps exaggerated when it comes to the present situation, but they agreed that the trends he illustrates are real and can become increasingly problematic in the future.

Peter Decherney reviewed the book for The Moving Image: The Journal of the Association of Moving Image Archivists. He declared it "an important book for many reaadership": artists, policymakers, college students, but most importantly, film historians and archivists. He found Lessig's argument generally convincing, although perhaps a bit too pessimistic. Decherney wrote that while historically the law is slow to change, it nonetheless does change, and thanks to Lessig's commendable activism for bringing the problems with the copyright law before the public, the change may be swifter and more positive than in the past.

Michael O'Hare in his review for the Journal of Cultural Economics noted that that while the book has a few minor flaws (for example, the ebook version reviewed was a poorly formatted PDF with no hyperlinks), the work is an "extremely thoughtful and well-informed" analysis of modern state of culture and the law. For the "most distinctive contribution of the book", he singled out the argument that technology can take content or activities that were historically free (such as reading or lending) and make them subject to unfair control by the provider of new mediums or services, therefore reducing our freedom to act.

Frederick Pinto reviewed the book for the Harvard International Review. He states that the book's "main strengths lie in its empirical richness and in Lessig's mastery at placing current legal developments in a wide historical context". He concludes that while Lessig's may be suffering from a "tunnel vision", the book "retains enough objectivity and academic rigor to make it an interesting and important read in this debate".

Julia D. Mahoney in the Virginia Law Review was more critical. She found Lessig's arguments not convincing, as according to her, our current world "is a vibrant place where technological innovation, creative endeavors, and public discussion of political issues flourish", and Lessig exaggerates the scope of the problems faced, and fails to present reasonable solutions to the issues he describes.

Lawrence B. Solum reviewed the book for Texas Law Review. He wrote that Lessig's work is a sophisticated work, but it is should not be seen as academic book, but rather one addressed to the general audience, as next to "deeply illuminating" arguments it also contains emotional "cheap shots" and simplifies some arguments into a black versus white situation. The book, he writes, successfully asserts: "how an excess of intellectual property can lead to results that seem silly, pernicious or wrong", how "our legal traditions actually sanction unauthorized copying", and how "the social forces that are pushing for further expansion of copyright, the big media companies, are the bad guys". He notes, however, that "what Lessig opposes is clear, but why and what he favors instead are much murkier". In the end, he concludes, the book, while obviously written to advance a particular point of view, is "a model of restraint", presenting "an account that, while opinionated, is nuanced, fair, and balanced" and calling the result "intelligent, entertaining and moving".

== Derivative works ==
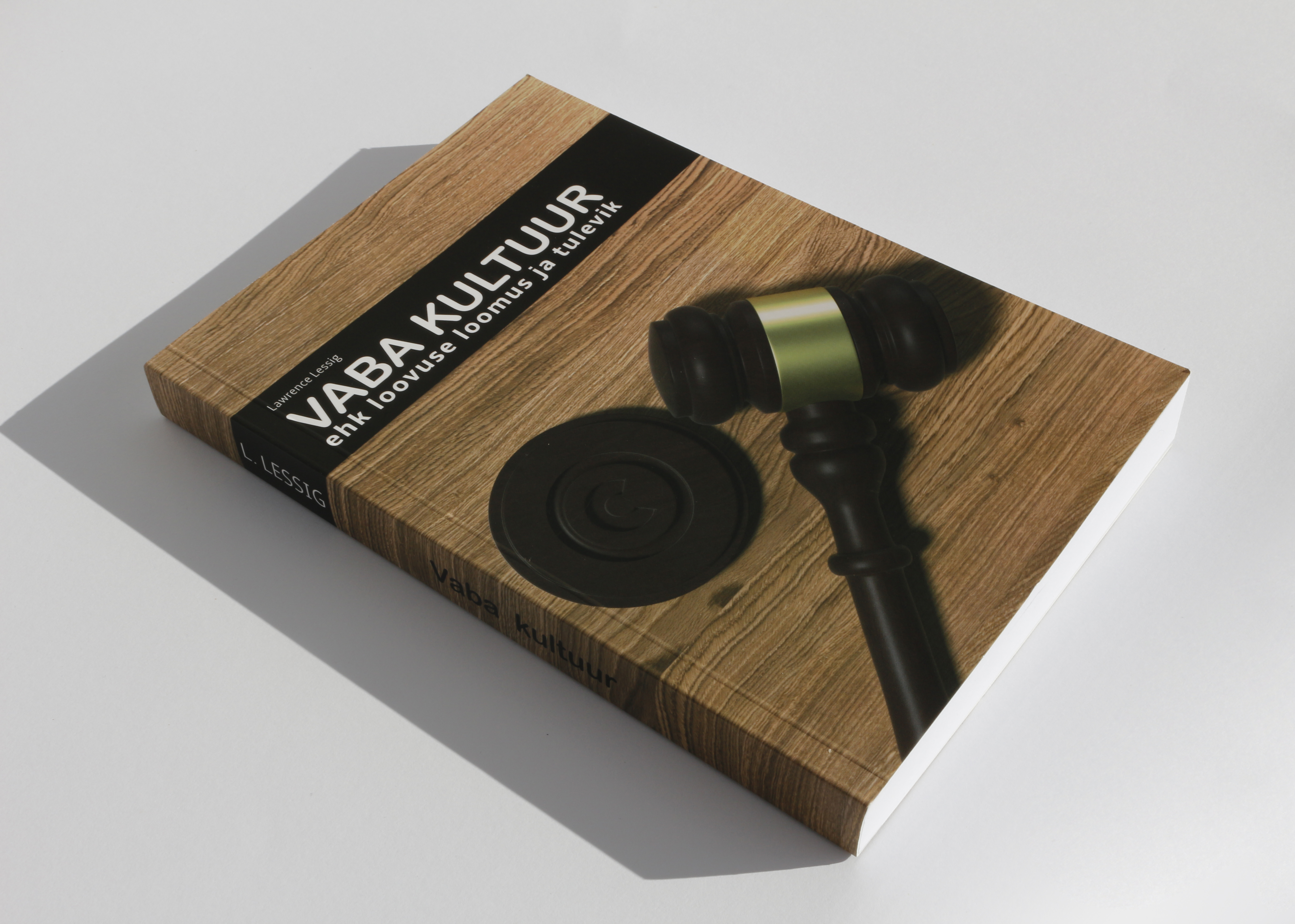
Estonian translation of the book was published in 2017

A day after the book was released online, blogger AKMA (A. K. Adam) suggested that people pick a chapter and make a voice recording of it, partly because they were allowed to. Users who commented volunteered to narrate certain chapters. Two days later, most of the book had been narrated.

Besides audio production, this book was also translated into Chinese, a project proposed by Isaac Mao and completed as a collaboration involving many bloggers from mainland China and Taiwan. Other translations include Catalan, Czech, French, Hungarian, Italian, Polish, Portuguese and Spanish.

== Different editions ==
- Lessig, Lawrence (2004). Free Culture: How Big Media Uses Technology and the Law to Lock Down Culture and Control Creativity (US 1st hardcover ed.). Penguin Press HC. ISBN 1-59420-006-8.
- Lessig, Lawrence (2004). Free Culture: How Big Media Uses Technology and the Law to Lock Down Culture and Control Creativity (PDF) (PDF ed.). Internet Archive. Archived from the original (PDF) on 2015-10-13.
- Lessig, Lawrence (2005). Free Culture: The Nature and Future of Creativity (US 1st paperback ed.). Penguin Books (Non-Classics). ISBN 0-14-303465-0.
- Lessig, Lawrence (2015). Free Culture: How Big Media Uses Technology and the Law to Lock Down Culture and Control Creativity (US paperback ed.). Petter Reinholdtsen. ISBN 978-82-690182-0-2.
