= Code: Version 2.0 =

2006 book by Lawrence Lessig

- Author: Lawrence Lessig
- Publication date: 2006
- Pages: 410
- ISBN: 978-0-465-03914-2
- OCLC: 133467669
- Preceded by: Free Culture
- Followed by: Remix

Code: Version 2.0 is a 2006 book by Harvard law professor Lawrence Lessig which proposes that governments have broad regulatory powers over the Internet. The book is released under the CC BY-SA 2.5 Creative Commons license.

== The book ==
The book is an update to Lessig's book Code and Other Laws of Cyberspace, which was written in response and opposition to the notion that state governments could not regulate cyberspace and the Internet. The original argument that Lessig took issue with was weakened in the years following the book's release, as it became widely acknowledged that government regulation of the Internet was imminent, and so the author thought it necessary to update the work. Lessig acknowledges that there are those who continue to disagree with his viewpoint, but adamantly maintains that the Internet will increasingly evolve in a more regulable direction.

== Dedication ==
The book is dedicated to Wikipedia with the words:

Dedicated to Wikipedia, the one surprise that teaches more than everything here.

== Collaboratively writing the book ==
Code: Version 2.0 was developed by Lessig and a group of Stanford Law School students with the help of the Jotspot Code V2 wiki.

== See also ==
- Free Culture
