= Remix culture =

Culture encouraging the creation of derivative works

Building blocks icon as symbol for remixing, proposed by Creative Commons and derived from FreeCulture.org.

Remix culture, also known as read-write culture, is a term describing a culture that allows and encourages the creation of derivative works by combining or editing existing materials. Remix cultures are permissive of efforts to improve upon, change, integrate, or otherwise remix the work of other creators. While combining elements has always been a common practice of artists of all domains throughout human history, the growth of exclusive copyright restrictions in the last several decades limits this practice more and more by the legal chilling effect. In reaction, Harvard law professor Lawrence Lessig, who considers remixing a desirable concept for human creativity, has worked since the early 2000s on a transfer of the remixing concept into the digital age. Lessig founded the Creative Commons in 2001, which released a variety of licenses as tools to promote remix culture, as remixing is legally hindered by the default exclusive copyright regime applied on intellectual property. The remix culture for cultural works is related to and inspired by the earlier Free and open-source software for software movement, which encourages the reuse and remixing of software works.

== Description ==
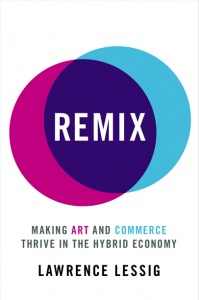
Remix: Making Art and Commerce Thrive in the Hybrid Economy by Lawrence Lessig in 2008 describes the remix culture. The book itself is open for remix due to its availability under a CC BY-NC license.

Lawrence Lessig described the Remix culture in his 2008 book Remix. Lawrence characterized the default media culture of the 20th century using computer technology terminology as Read Only culture (RO), and called for a shift to Read/Write culture (RW).

In the usual Read Only media culture, the culture is consumed more or less passively. The information or product is provided by a 'professional' source, the content industry, that possesses an authority on that particular product/information. There is a one-way flow only of creative content and ideas due to a clear role separation between content producer and content consumer. The emergence of Analog mass production and duplication technologies (pre-Digital revolution and internet like radio broad-casting) enabled the RO culture's business model of production and distribution and limited the role of the consumer to consumption of media.

Digital technology does not have the 'natural' constraints of the analog that preceded it. RO culture had to be recoded in order to compete with the "free" distribution made possible by the Internet. This is primarily done in the form of digital rights management (DRM), which imposes largely arbitrary restrictions on usage. Regardless, DRM has proven largely ineffective in enforcing the constraints of analog media onto digital media.

Read/Write culture has a reciprocal relationship between the producer and the consumer. Taking works, such as songs, and appropriating them in private circles is exemplary of RW culture, which was considered to be the 'popular' culture before the advent of reproduction technologies. The technologies and copyright laws that soon followed, however, changed the dynamics of popular culture. As it became professionalized, people were taught to defer production to the professionals.

Digital technologies have provided tools for reviving RW culture and democratizing production, sometimes referred to as Web 2.0. Blogs explain the three layers of this democratization. Blogs have redefined the general audience's relationship to the content industry as they allowed access to non-professional, user-generated content. The 'comments' feature that soon followed provided a space for readers to have a dialogue with the contributors. 'Tagging' of the blogs by users based on the content provided the necessary layer for users to filter the sea of content according to their interest. The third layer added bots that analyzed the relationship between various websites by counting the clicks between them and, thus, organizing a database of preferences. The three layers working together established an ecosystem of reputation that served to guide users through the blogosphere. While many amateur online publications cannot compete with the validity of professional sources, the democratization of digital RW culture and the ecosystem of reputation provides a space for many talented voices to be heard that was not available in the pre-digital RO model.

== History ==
Remixing was always a part of the human culture. US media scholar Professor Henry Jenkins argued that "the story of American arts in the 19th century might be told in terms of the mixing, matching and merging of folk traditions taken from various indigenous and immigrant populations." Another historical example of remixing is Cento, a literary genre popular in Medieval Europe consisting mainly of verses or extracts directly borrowed from the works of other authors and arranged in a new form or order.

The balance between creation and consumption shifted with the technological progress on media recording and reproduction. Notable events are the invention of book printing press and the analog Sound recording and reproduction leading to severe cultural and legal changes.

=== Analog era ===
In the beginning of the 20th century, on the dawn of the analog Sound recording and reproduction revolution, John Philip Sousa, an American composer and conductor of the late Romantic era, warned in 1906 in a congressional hearing on a negative change of the musical culture by the now available "canned music".

"These talking machines are going to ruin the artistic development of music in this country. When I was a boy...in front of every house in the summer evenings, you would find young people together singing the songs of the day or old songs. Today you hear these infernal machines going night and day. We will not have a vocal cord left. The vocal cord will be eliminated by a process of evolution, as was the tail of man when he came from the ape."

Specialized, expensive creation devices ("read-write") and specialized cheap consumption ("read-only") devices allowed a centralized production by few and decentralized consumption by many. Analog devices for consumers for low prices, lacking the capability of writing and creating, spread out fast: Newspapers, Jukebox, radio, television. This new business model, an Industrial information economy, demanded and resulted in the strengthening of the exclusive copyright and a weakening of the remix culture and the Public domain in throughout the 19th and 20th century.

Analog creation devices were expensive and also limited in their editing and rearranging capability. An analog copy of a work (e.g. an audio tape) cannot be edited, copied and worked on infinitely often as the quality continuously worsens. Despite that, a creative remixing culture survived to some limited degree. For instance composer John Oswald coined in 1985 the Plunderphonics term in his essay Plunderphonics, or Audio Piracy as a Compositional Prerogative for sound collages based on existing audio recordings and altering them in some way to make a new composition. Likewise, the phenomenon of scratch videos emerged at the onset of remix culture.

=== Remixing as digital age phenomena ===
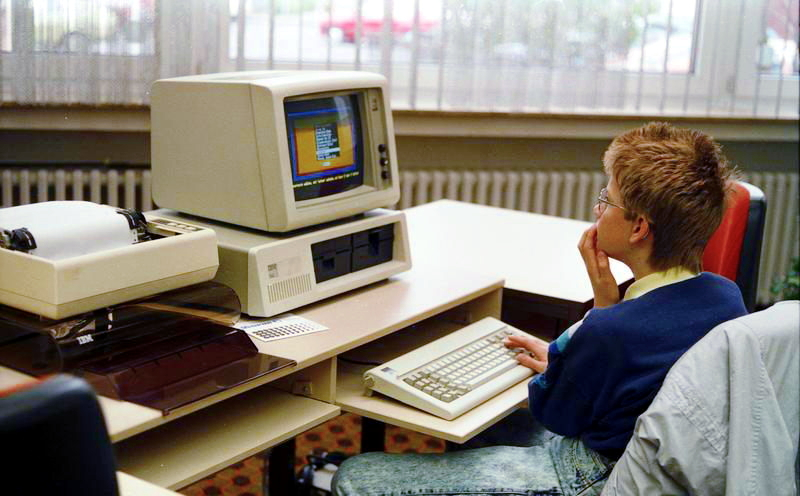
IBM Personal Computer XT in 1988, a digital remixing enabling prosumer device, affordable for the masses.

Technology changed fundamentally with the digital revolution. Digital information could be reproduced and edited infinitely, often without quality loss. Still, in the 1960s the first digital general computing devices with such capabilities were meant only for specialists and professionals and were extremely expensive; the first consumer-oriented devices like video game consoles inherently lacked RW capability. But in the 1980s, the arrival of the home computer and especially the IBM personal computer brought a digital prosumer device, a device usable for production and consumption at the same time, to the masses for an affordable price. Similarly for software, in the 1990s the free and open-source software movement implemented a software ecosystem based on the idea of edit-ability by anyone.

=== Internet and Web 2.0 ===
The broad diffusion of the Internet and of the Web in the late 1990s and early 2000s created a highly effective way to re-implement a "remix culture" in all domains of art, technology and society. Unlike TV and radio, with a unidirectional information transport (producer to consumer), the Internet is inherently bidirectional, enabling a peer-to-peer dynamic. This accelerated with Web 2.0 and more user-generated content due to Commons-based peer production possibilities. Remixes of songs, videos, and photos are easily distributed and created. There is a constant revision to what is being created, which is done on both a professional and amateur scale. The availability of various end-user oriented software such as GarageBand and Adobe Photoshop makes it easy to remix. The Internet allows distribution of remixes to the masses. Internet memes are Internet-specific creative content which are created, filtered and transformed by the viral spreading process made possible by the web and its users.

=== Foundation of the Creative Commons ===
Creative Commons license spectrum between public domain (top) and all rights reserved (bottom). On the left side the permitted use cases, on the right side the license components. Remixing is permitted in the two green license groups.

As a response to a more restrictive copyright system (Sonny Bono Copyright Term Extension, DMCA), which started to limit the blooming sharing and remixing activities of the web, Lawrence Lessig founded the Creative Commons in 2001. In 2002 the Creative Commons released a set of licenses as tools to enable remix culture, by allowing a balanced, fair enabling release of creative works, "some rights reserved" instead of the usual "all rights reserved". Several companies and governmental organizations adapted this approach and licenses in the following years, for instance flickr, DeviantART and Europeana using or offering CC license options which allow remixing. There are several webpages addressing this remix culture, for instance ccMixter founded 2004.

The 2008 open-source film by Brett Gaylor RiP!: A Remix Manifesto documents "the changing concept of copyright".

In 2012, Canada's Copyright Modernization Act explicitly added a new exemption which allows non-commercial remixing. In 2013 the US court ruling Lenz v. Universal Music Corp. acknowledged that amateur remixing might fall under fair use and copyright holders are requested to check and respect fair use before doing DMCA take down notices.

== Copyright ==
Under copyright laws of many countries, anyone with the intent to remix an existing work without permission is liable for lawsuit because the laws protect the intellectual property of the work. However, current copyright laws are proving to be ineffective at preventing sampling of content. On the other hand, fair-use does not address a wide enough range of use-cases and its borders are not well established and defined, making usage under "fair use" legally risky. Lessig argues that there needs to be a change in the current state of copyright laws to legalize remix culture, especially for fair-use cases. He states that "outdated copyright laws have turned our children into criminals." One proposition is to adopt the system of citation used with book references. The artist would cite the intellectual property she sampled which would give the original creator the credit, as is common with literature references. As tools for doing so Lawrence Lessig proposed the Creative Commons licenses which demand for instance Attribution without restricting the general use of a creative work. One step further is the Free content movement, which proposes that creative content should be released under free licenses. The Copyright reform movement tries to tackle the problem by cutting for instance the excessively long copyright terms, as it was debated by scholar Rufus Pollock.

Other copyright scholars, such as Yochai Benkler and Erez Reuveni, promulgate ideas that are closely related to remix culture. Some scholars argue that the academic and legal institutions must change with the culture towards one that is remix-based.

In June 2015, a WIPO article named "Remix Culture and Amateur Creativity: A Copyright Dilemma" acknowledged the "age of remixing" and the need for a copyright reform.

== Domains of remixing ==
=== Folklore and vocal traditions ===
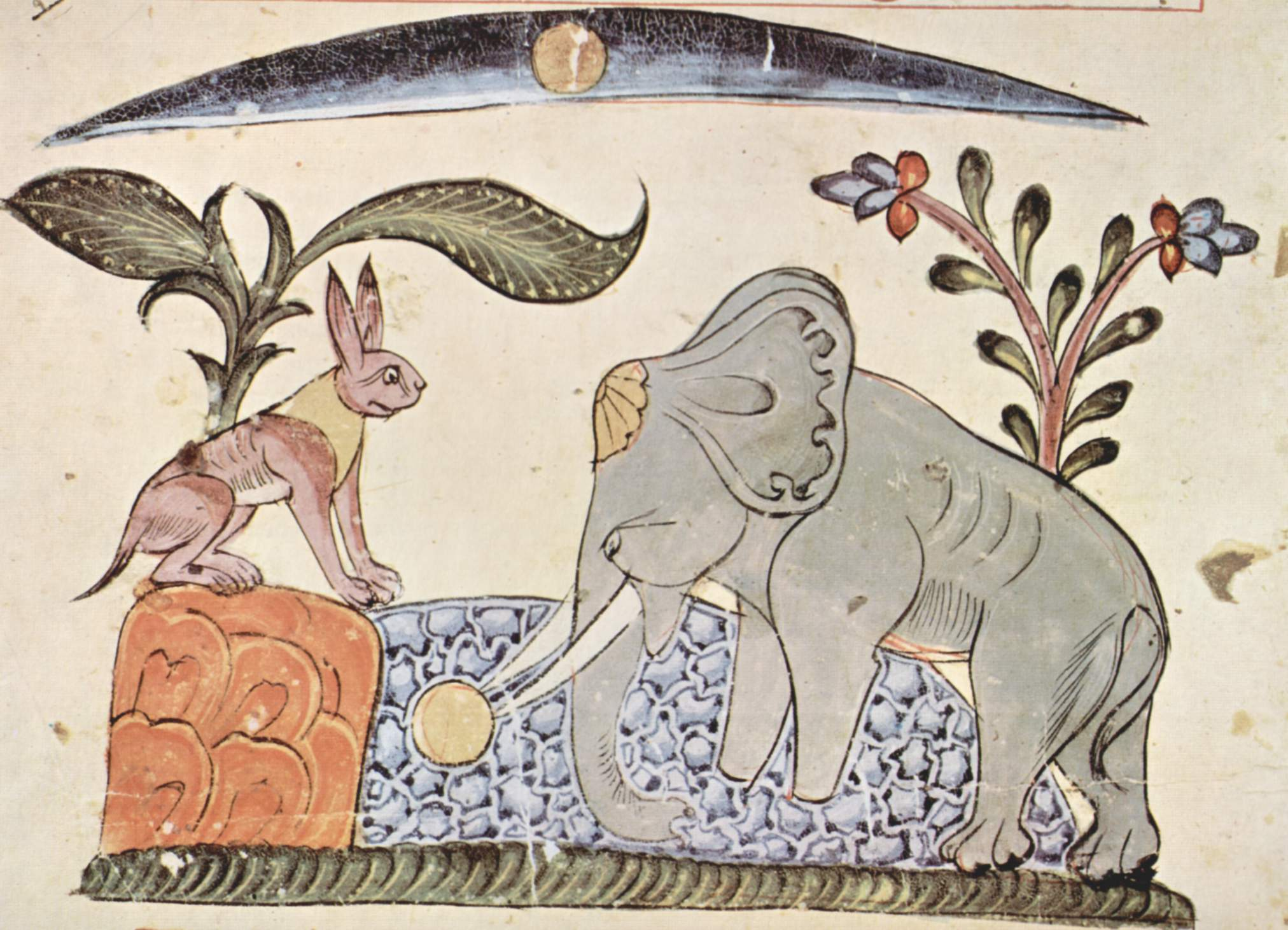
An illustration from a 1354 Syrian edition of the Panchatantra, an ancient Indian collection of animal fables. The original work is believed to be composed around the 3rd century BCE, Translator's introduction, quoting Hertel: "the original work was composed in Kashmir, about 200 B.C. At this date, however, many of the individual stories were already ancient." based on older oral traditions, including "animal fables that are as old as we are able to imagine".

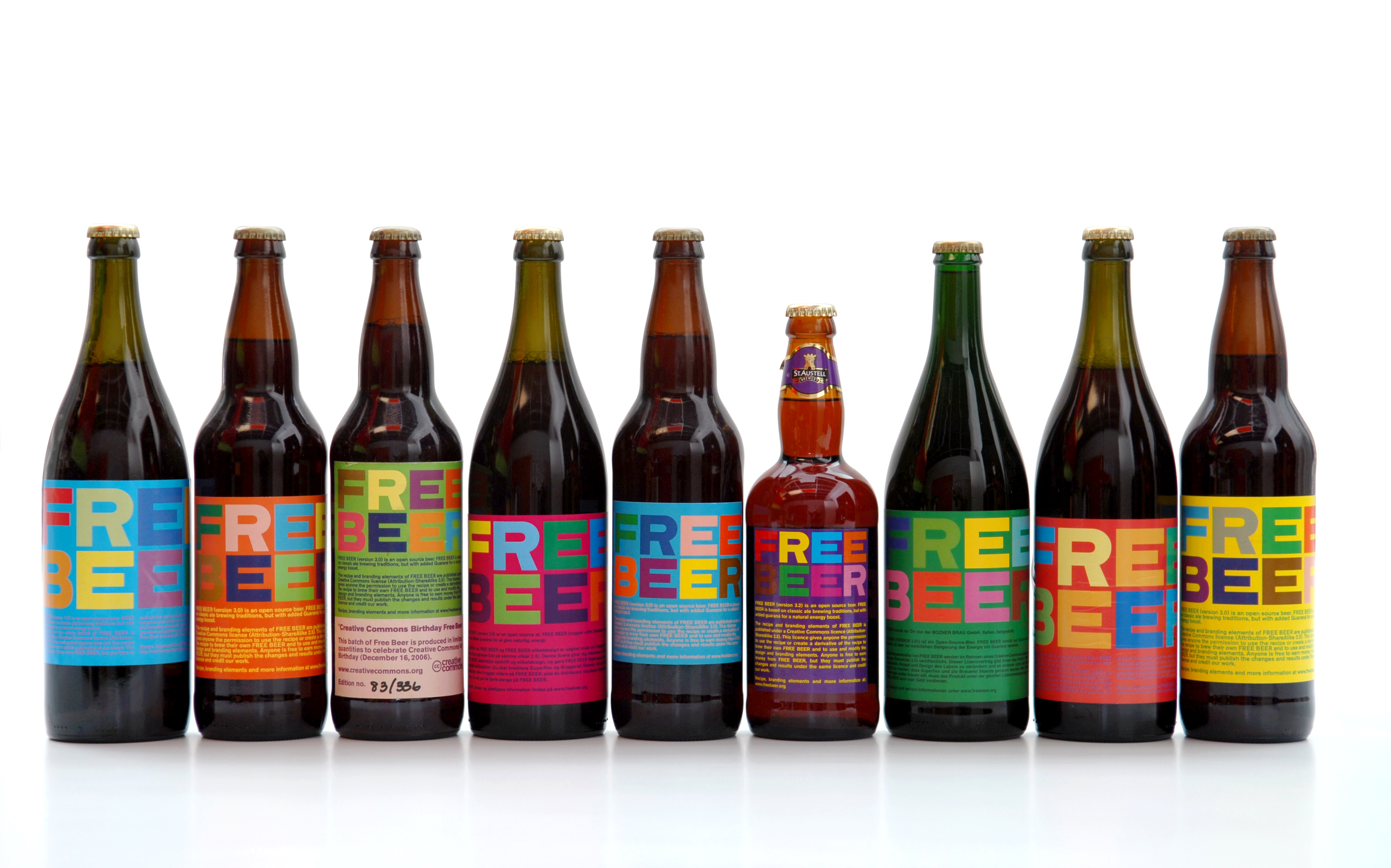
Various "remixed" Free Beer variants in recipe and label artwork, created since the first release in 2005 under a Creative Commons license.

- Folklore existed long before any copyright law. All folk tales, folk songs, folk art, folk poetry, etc. was revised constantly through the folk process. According to Ramsay Wood, the oldest known example of remix culture is the Panchatantra, an ancient Indian collection of interrelated animal fables in verse and prose, arranged within a frame story. The original Sanskrit work is believed to be composed around the 3rd century BCE, based on older oral traditions, including "animal fables that are as old as we are able to imagine". The Panchatantra was reinterpreted in the following 2300 years at least 200 times in 50 different languages all around the world.
- Cooking recipes might be among the oldest knowledge of mankind which was inherited further and shared unrestricted for adaption and improvement. A recent example is the Free Beer project of Superflex which has recipe and label artwork under a creative commons license, actively encouraging free adaption and reuse.
- Parodies are a form of satire that adapt another work of art in order to ridicule it. Parodies date back at least to ancient Greek times. Parody exists in all art media, including literature, music and cinema.

=== Graphic arts ===
- Remixing in the graphical arts is long known as appropriation. An example for appropriation in graphics is the never-ending remix of Leonardo da Vinci's piece Mona Lisa (see Mona Lisa replicas and reinterpretations and Derivative works of Mona Lisa). This painting has been reproduced innumerable times with different faces and Photoshop effects, such as Marcel Duchamp's L.H.O.O.Q. Some remixed images include Photoshopped images of the Mona Lisa mixed with Mr. Bean and an alien-like version.

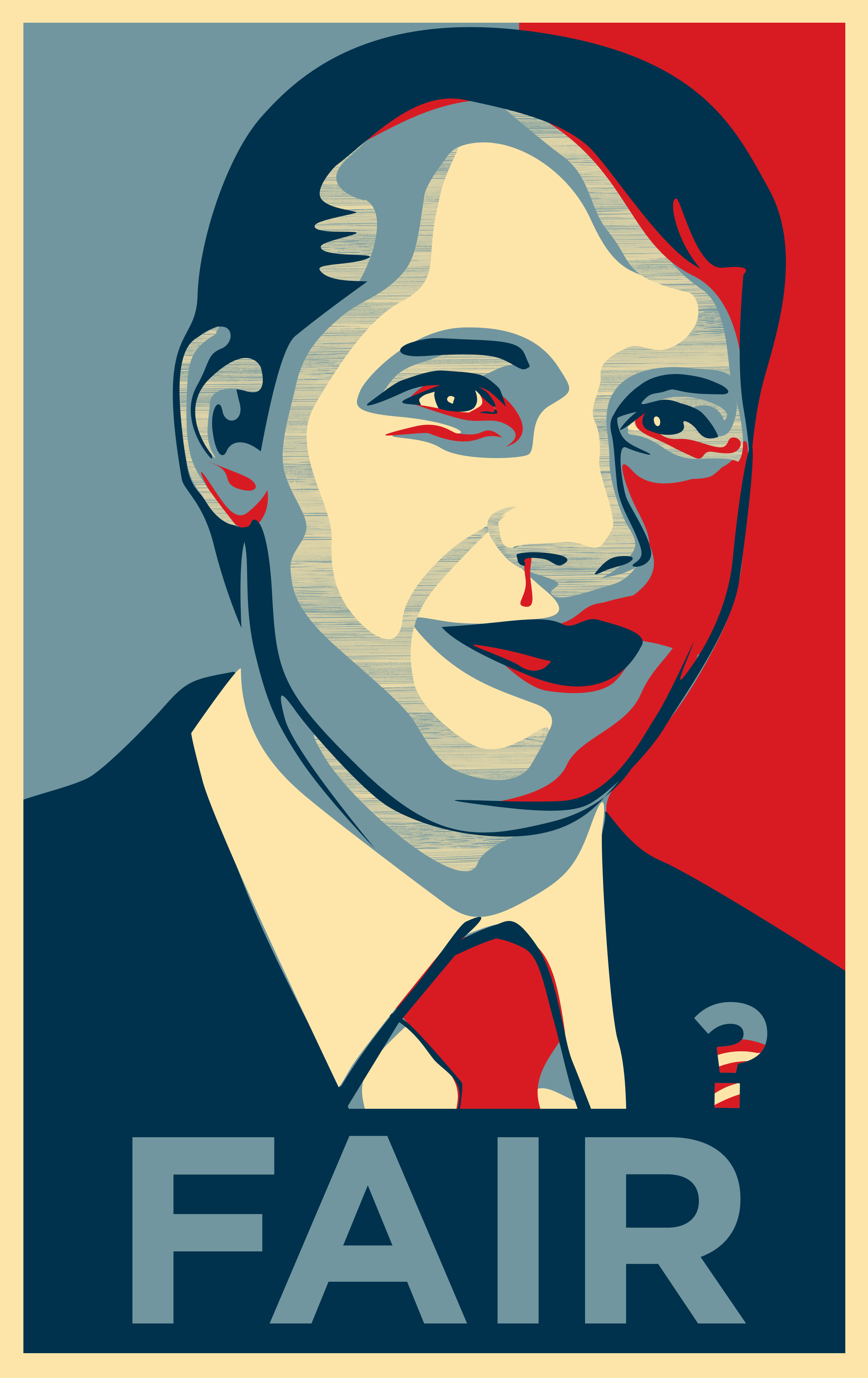
Illustration of Shepard Fairey by David Owen Morgan, critiquing Fairey's claims of Fair Use.

- Graffiti is an example of read/write culture where the participants interact with their surroundings and environment. In much the same way that advertisements decorate walls, graffiti allows the public to choose the images to have displayed on their buildings. By using spray paint, or other mediums, the artists essentially remix and change the wall or other surface to display their twist or critique. Street art is a sub-genre of graffiti, distinguished by emphasizing artistic elements other than text, and utilizing a variety of mediums, including paint, stenciling, collage, and the incorporation of physical surfaces and objects, while often providing critical social commentary. Street artist Shepard Fairey built their personal brand on a remixed image of professional wrestler Andre the Giant, done in a pop-art style, with the term OBEY printed beneath the portrait. Fairey applied a similar technique when designing the popular HOPE campaign poster in support of then 2008 U.S. Presidential Candidate Barack Obama. Fairey's HOPE image was also similar in composition to the iconic posterized image of Che Guevara, adapted from the photograph Guerrillero Heroico. That same image of Guevara has also been remixed by notable contemporary English graffiti artist Banksy, who adapted the pastiche in their work Haight Street Rat which depicts a rat wearing Guevara's red beret, and holding a red marker next to the words "This is where I draw the line."

=== Books and other information ===
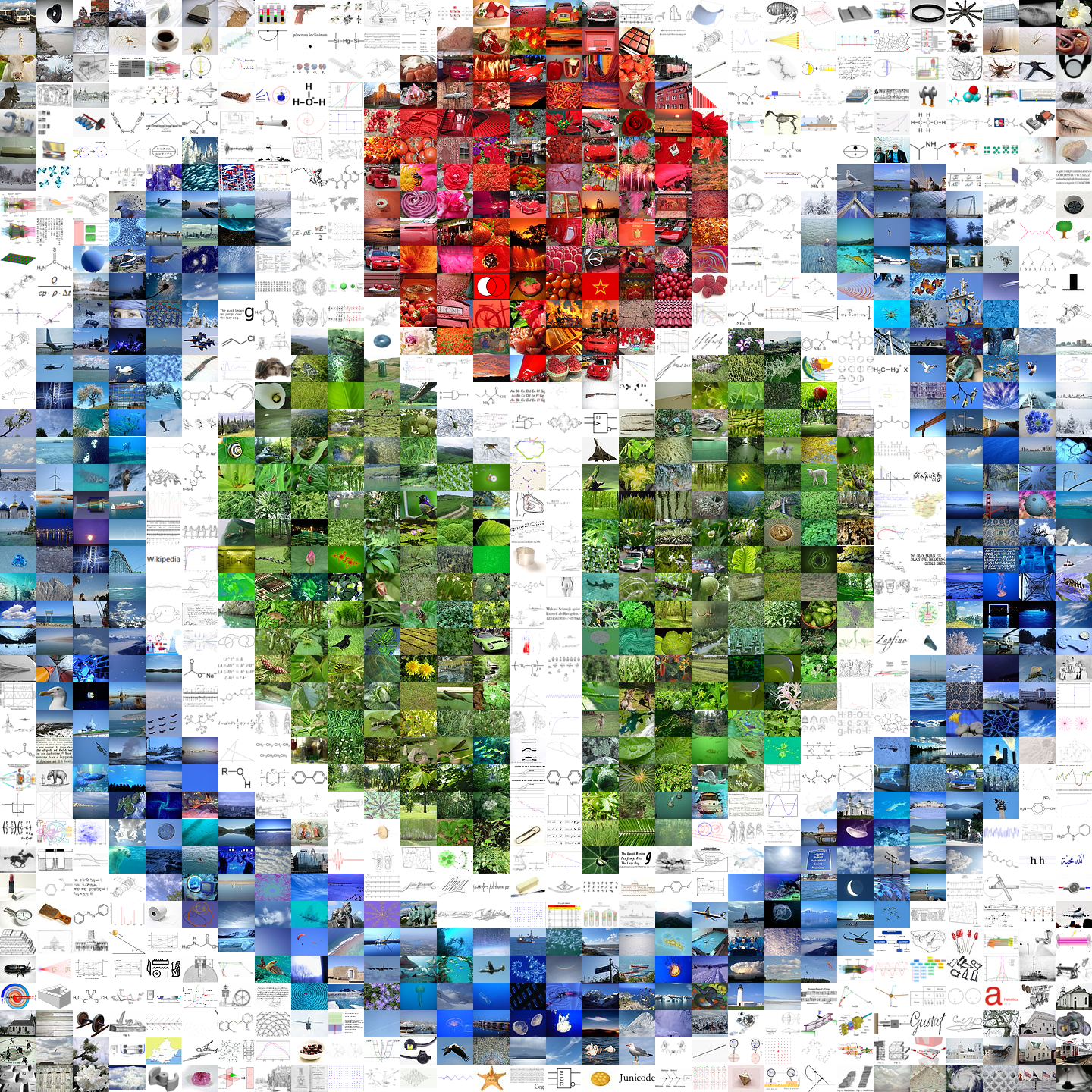
Wikimedia logo mosaic to commemorate the one millionth file at Wikimedia Commons. Remixed from the contributed images on the Wikimedia commons.

- Wikipedia is an example of a written remix, where the public is encouraged to add their knowledge in an encyclopedia. The wiki-based website essentially allows a user to remix the information presented. Amazon.com called Wikipedia "the world's most exhaustive and up-to-date encyclopedia" because it is edited and produced by such a large pool of people.
- Scanlations are fan-made translations of comics from a language into another language.
- Book mashups, combining multiple books, received attention in 2009 with Seth Grahame-Smith's Pride and Prejudice and Zombies.
- The OpenStreetMap project creates a free editable map of the world, with over two million registered users who collect data using manual surveys, GPS devices, aerial photography, and other free sources.
- The Wikimedia Commons is digital data repository open for free content contribution from the public. The content, mostly images and sound files, is licensed under Creative Commons licenses enabling free reuse and remixing by anyone. Another examples are the collaborative image hosting sites Flickr and DeviantART who offer Creative Commons license options.

=== Software and other digital goods ===
Software as digital goods are suited for adaption and remixing.

- Pre-internet Public domain software of the 1960s and 1970s was software which was shared, edited and improved constantly as type-in programs. The Free and open-source software movement can be seen as a kind of successor to that practice.
- In the Free and open-source software culture, established in the 1990s as opposition to proprietary software, sharing, forking and reusing are natural parts of the development model. For instance, the Linux operating system, with its commercial offspring Android and ChromeOS, is a highly successful result of a software "remix culture".
- The arrival of Internet facing software repositories helped the remix software development model enormously in the 2000s. GitHub has helped further the collaborative software development in remix style since 2008.
- Fangames are video games made by fans based on one or more established video games, often acting as a sequel when no official sequel exists. Dōjin soft is the Japanese-specific variant, and homebrew typically for proprietary hardware consoles.
- OverClocked ReMix is a community dedicated to preserving and paying tribute to video game music through non-commercial re-arranging and re-interpreting the songs.
- Video game modding is the creative adaption of a released video game. In the 2000s the video game industry noticed the potential and often supports mod makers actively with modding kits. Special cases are fan patches, server emulators and Fan translation of video games who made by fans to alleviate bugs or shortcomings.
- Machinimas are fan-made videos "remixed" from and with video games, going far beyond the original scope and intent.
- Retrocomputing and computer and digital preservation activities as emulation and reverse engineering have been described as aspects of the remixing culture.
- Household 3D printing heavily relies on remixing as this allows users to repurpose existing designs. Several academic studies have highlighted the importance of remixing for the 3D printing community. Platforms such as Thingiverse, Printables and Cults3D are 3D printing communities that allow its users to create, share, and access a broad range of printable digital models. The possibility to remix existing models are core features of these platforms.

=== Music ===
- DJing is the act of live rearranging and remixing of pre-recorded music material to new compositions. From this music, the term remix spread to other domains.
- Sampling in music making is an example of reuse and remix to produce a new work. Sampling is widely popular within hip-hop culture. Grandmaster Flash and Afrika Bambaataa were some of the earliest hip-hop artists to employ the practice of sampling. This practice can also be traced to artists such as Led Zeppelin, who interpolated substantial portions of music by many acts including Willie Dixon, Howlin' Wolf, Jake Holmes, and Spirit. By taking a small clip of an existing song, changing different parameters such as pitch, and incorporating it into a new piece, the artist can make it their own.
- Music mashups are blends of existing music tracks. The 2004 album dj BC presents The Beastles received acclaim and was featured in Newsweek and Rolling Stone. A second album named Let It Beast with cover art by cartoonist Josh Neufeld was produced in 2006. Mashup DJ Gregg Gillis, who performs as Girl Talk, crafts entire albums out of remixed material, and cites Fair Use privileges to sample copyrighted works. Other notable mashup DJs include Danger Mouse, Dean Gray, and DJ Earworm.
- Some genres of music are defined by their usage of remixing. DJ Screw created the chopped and screwed genre by accidentally playing a record that was meant for 45 rpm at 33 1/3 rpm, creating a slowed, laid-back, psychedelic effect. Over the slowed down track Screw would layer drum tracks and then scratch the records to create a classic Southern hip-hop sound. Nightcore is a genre that speeds up mainstream rock, pop, and EDM songs, often with additional production. The sped -up nature leads to the original song playing at a higher pitch, so the production added usually fills out the low-end with heavy bass and then adds other high pitched elements to enhance the energy of the song. Building upon plunderphonics and chopped and screwed, vaporwave as a musical genre involves slowing down smooth jazz, RnB, and Elevator music and usually adding reverb and backing synths, creating a trippy new-age ambience.

=== Film and video ===
In film, remixing is often done and happens in many forms.

- Most new movies are adaptations of comics, graphic novels, books, or other forms of media. The majority of other Hollywood cinema works are typically genre films that follow strict generic plots. These forms of movies hardly appear original and creative, but rather rely on adapting material from previous works or genre formulas, which is a form of remix. A prime example is the film Kill Bill which takes many techniques and scene templates from other films (predating all these were The Magnificent Seven, an official remake of The Seven Samurai, and Sergio Leone's A Fistful of Dollars).
- Video mashups combine multiple pre-existing video sources with no discernible relation with each other into a unified video. Examples of mashup videos include movie trailer remixes, vids, YouTube poop, and supercuts.
- Vidding is the fan labor practice in media fandom of creating music videos from the footage of one or more visual media sources, thereby exploring the source itself in a new way. The specialized form for animation shows is called Anime music videos, also made by fans.
- VJing, similar to DJing, is the real-time manipulation of imagery through technological mediation and for an audience, in synchronization to music.
- Fandubs and Fansubs are reworks of fans on released film material.
- Walt Disney works are important company remixing examples, for instance Beauty and the Beast, Aladdin, Frozen. These remixes are based on earlier public domain works (although Disney films are altered from their original sources). Lawrence Lessig therefore called Walt Disney a "remixer extraordinaire" and praised him as ideal of the remix culture in 2010. Some journalists however report that Disney tolerates fan remixes (Fan art) more than in earlier times.

=== GIFs ===
GIFs are another example of remix culture. They are illustrations and small clips from films used for personal expressions in online conversations. GIFs are commonly taken from an online video form such as film, TV, or YouTube videos. Each clip usually lasts for about 3 seconds and is "looped, extended and repeated." GIFs take a mass media sample and reimagines, or remixes, its meaning from the original context to use it as a form of personal expression in a different context. They are used throughout various media platforms but are most popular in Tumblr where they are used to articulate a punch line.

=== Fan fiction ===
Fan fiction is an example of remix culture in action, in relation to various forms of fictional and non-fictional media, including books, TV shows, movies, musicians, actors, and more. Fan fiction is a written, remixed fiction that draws on the characters of the writer's fandom, in order to tell the fan fiction writer's own story, or their version of the original story. Remix Culture relies on creators taking one work and repurposing it for another use just as fan fiction takes an existing work and repurposes it for a new story, or series of events. Steven Hetcher writes that fan fiction, and remix culture at a broader level, can provide social benefit to the societies who participate in writing and reading fan fiction by providing a creative outlet. Fan fiction remixes sometimes change aspects of the characters or setting, often called an alternative universe, with some writers putting pre-existing characters in a new setting, and others taking an established setting and placing in new characters. In the social norms of fan fiction, it is rare for writers to publish or profit off of their works, and so copyright owners and authors rarely enforce copyright law, as these works help form communities and promote the original work.

=== TikTok ===
The app TikTok has become a relevant media platform that utilizes remix culture as a marketing and engagement technique, using it to market products to viewers while also entertaining them. Content creators and brands can now collaborate in an environment where remixing content is accepted and encouraged to gain followers through creative videos following trending actions, audios, and memes. Older songs and celebrities are making comebacks by being attached to remix trends, their music or content is now being viewed again by being attached to a trend. It garners attention for the artist and these bits is a marketing technique that lets viewers discover artists. Musicians like Doja Cat and Lil Nas X are two current musicians that have cultivated their music in the TikTok remix culture. For example, "Remember (Walking In The Sand)" the 1960s song by the Shangri-Las has recently been remixed to an EDM track that brought more attention to the song and a following to it due to a popular TikTok trend circulating largely in 2020. These trending songs allow for music on TikTok to become spreadable and testable. Companies and artists can test out music bits and loops to see how successful they may become before fully releasing them.

=== Remixing in religion ===
Throughout history remix culture has been truthful not only in exchange of oral stories but also through the Bible. Eugene H. Peterson reinterpreted Bible stories in his 2002 book "The Message// Remix" which makes the Bible easier for readers to interpret. An idea of remixing dated back to the Quakers who would interpret the scripture and create a biblical narrative by using their own voices, which went against the "read-only" practice that was more common.

== Intertwining of media cultures ==
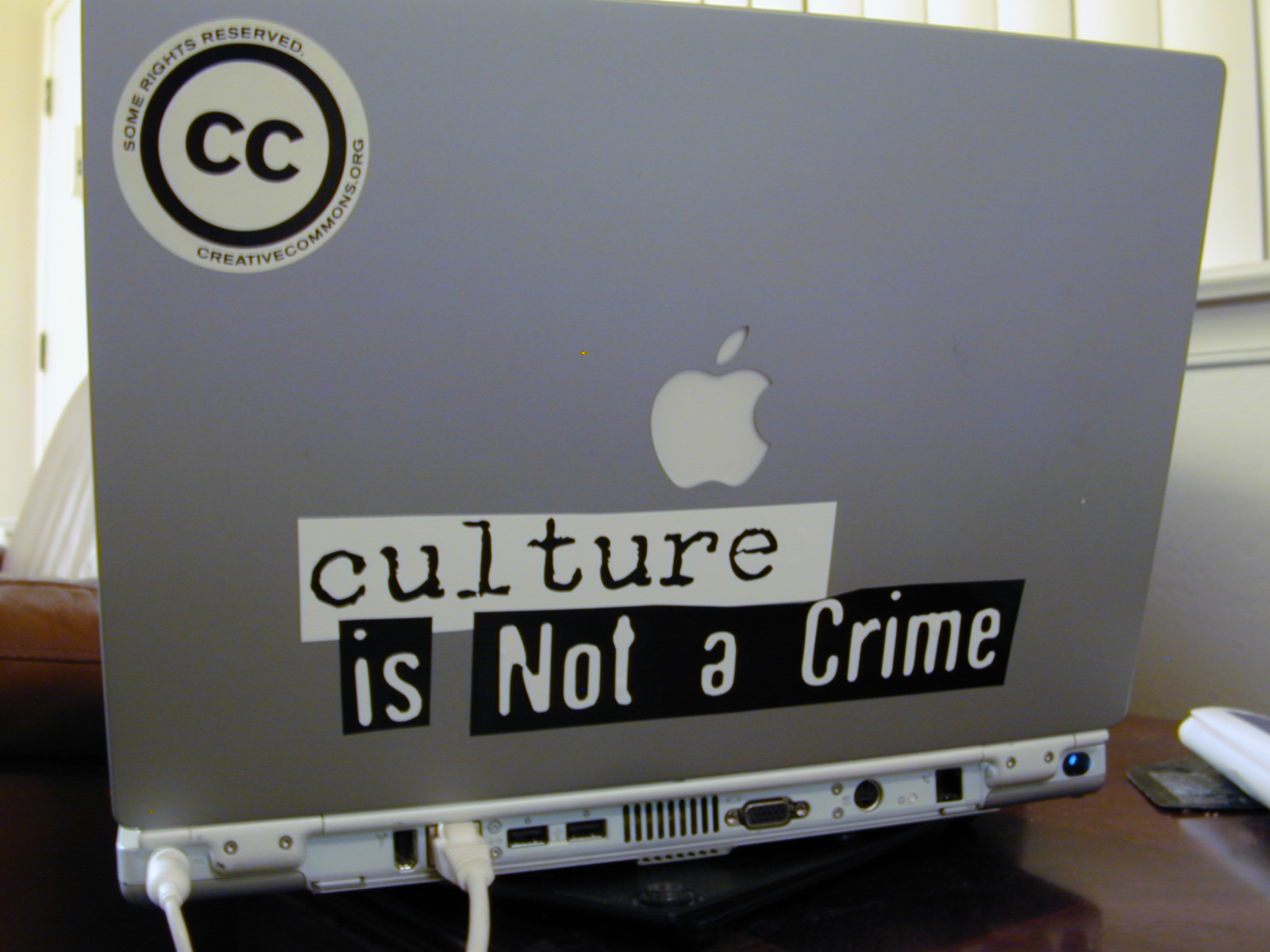
An Apple laptop computer decorated with Creative Commons stickers and the phrase "culture is not a crime." A small black and white CC sticker is placed on the upper left back of the computer that reads "Creative Commons. Some Rights Reserved."

For remix culture to survive, it must be shared and created by others. This is where participatory culture comes into play, because consumers start participating by becoming contributors, especially the many teens growing up with these media cultures. A book was published in 2013 by Henry Jenkins called "Reading in a Participatory Culture" which focuses on his technique of remixing the original story Moby-Dick to make it a new and fresh experience for students. This form of teaching enforces the correlation between participatory and remix culture while highlighting its importance in evolving literature. Remix culture can be an integral part of education. Arguably, scholars are constantly remixing when they are analyzing and reporting on the work of others. One study examined the use of remixing among students when presenting learned information. For example, students will pull images, text, and other information from various original sources and place those elements in a presentable format, such as a slide presentation, in order to demonstrate understanding of material reviewed. Media culture consumers start to look at art and content as something that can be repurposed or recreated, therefore they can become the producer. According to an article from Popular Music and Society, the idea of remix culture has become a defining characteristic of modern day technology which has incorporated all forms of digital media where the consumers are also the producers.

== Effects on artists ==
Artists participating in remix culture can potentially suffer consequences for violating copyright or intellectual property law. English rock band The Verve were sued over their song "Bittersweet Symphony" sampling an arrangement of The Rolling Stones' "The Last Time." The Verve were court-ordered to pay 100% of the song's royalties to The Rolling Stones' publishers and to give writing credit to Jagger and Richards. This was resolved in 2019 as Richard Ashcroft of The Verve announced that Jagger and Richards signed over the publishing rights to the song, admitting it was their manager's decision to claim the songs' royalties.

Remix culture has created an environment that is nearly impossible for artists to create or own "original work". Media and the internet have made art so public that it leaves the work up for other interpretation and, in return, remixing. A major example of this in the 21st century is the idea of memes. Once a meme is put into cyberspace it is automatically assumed that someone else can come along and remix the picture. For example, the 1964 self-portrait created by artist René Magritte, "Le Fils De L'Homme", was remixed and recreated by street artist Ron English in his piece "Stereo Magritte". (See Memes in "Reception and Impact")

Meanwhile, despite the legal complexities of copyright protections, remixed works continue to be popular in the mainstream. Rapper Lil Nas X's "Old Town Road," released in 2018, includes a sample by the industrial metal band Nine Inch Nails, while also blending the genres of hip-hop and country music. "Old Town Road" was a smash hit, setting a record of 19 weeks at number one on the Billboard Hot 100 Chart. Four official remixes of "Old Town Road" were released, the first of which featured country singer Billy Ray Cyrus. This formula for genre-hybridization inspired countless unofficial remixes of the track, appropriated for various uses.

== Copyright and remixing for disability services ==
An exemption exists for disability service technology to change copyrighted media to make it accessible to them. The American Foundation of the Blind (AFB), American Council of the Blind (ACB) and Samuelson-Glushko Technology Law & Policy Clinic (TLPC) work with U.S. Copyright Office, Library of Congress to renew the exemptions that allow the visually impaired to convert visual texts in copyrighted work into e-readers and other forms of technology that make it possible for them to access. So long as the copyrighted material is obtained in the legal way, the exemption allows for it to be remixed to help to be accessible to anyone disabled. This exemption extends broadly, including transcribing public broadcasts such as television or radio to be transcribed to braille or visual text if need be. With the proper license, obtained by anyone with a disability that can limit perception, copyrighted material that is obtained legally can be remixed for their understanding. It has last been renewed in 2012 and continues to stand.

== Reception and impact ==
In February 2010, Cato Institute's Julian Sanchez praised the remix activities for its social value, "for performing social realities" and remarked that copyright should be evaluated regarding the "level of control permitted to be exercised over our social realities". Memes have also become a form of political protest and dissent as well as tools used by everyday people as a form of a subversion of the power narrative. Author Apryl Williams asserts that #LivingWhileBlack memes helped the Black Lives Matter movement raise awareness of issues and shift the cultural narrative.

Kirby Ferguson's description of the creative process for all original ideas — copy, transform, and combine — presented in a 2012 TED talk.

According to Kirby Ferguson in his popular video series and TED talk, Everything is a Remix, and that all original material builds off of and remixes previously existing material. He argues if all intellectual property is influenced by other pieces of work, copyright laws would be unnecessary. Ferguson described that, the three key elements of creativity — copy, transform, and combine — are the building blocks of all original ideas; building on Pablo Picasso's famous quote "Good artists copy, great artists steal."

=== Criticism ===
Some approaches to remix culture have been described as simple plagiarism. In his 2006 book Cult of the Amateur, Web 2.0 critic Andrew Keen criticizes the culture. In 2011 UC Davis professor Thomas W. Joo criticized remix culture for romanticizing free culture while Terry Hart had a similar line of criticism in 2012.

== See also ==
- AI slop
- Commons-based peer production
- Culture jamming
- Fandom
- Good Copy Bad Copy
- Prosumer
- Recombinant culture
- Sampling (music)
- Sludge content

== Sources ==
- Edgerton, Franklin (1924). The Panchatantra Reconstructed (Vol.1: Text and Critical Apparatus, Vol.2: Introduction and Translation). New Haven, Connecticut: American Oriental Series Volumes 2–3.
- Olivelle, Patrick (2006). The Five Discourses on Worldly Wisdom. Clay Sanskrit Library. ISBN 978-0-8147-6208-0.
