= Recording Industry Association of America =

Trade organization in the U.S.

- Abbreviation: RIAA
- Formation: 1952; 74 years ago
- Type: Licensing and royalties, technical standards
- Headquarters: Washington, D.C., U.S.
- Location: United States
- Chairman and CEO: Mitch Glazier
- Website: riaa.com

The Recording Industry Association of America (RIAA) is a trade organization representing the United States recording industry. Its members include major record labels and distributors, which the RIAA states "create, manufacture, and/or distribute approximately 85 percent of all legally sold recorded music in the United States". The RIAA is headquartered in Washington, D.C.

The RIAA was formed in 1952. Its original mission was to administer recording copyright fees and problems, work with trade unions, and do research relating to the record industry and government regulations. Early RIAA standards included the RIAA equalization curve, the format of the stereophonic record groove and the dimensions of 33 1/3, 45, and 78 rpm records.

The RIAA says its current mission includes protecting intellectual property rights and the First Amendment rights of artists; performing research about the music industry; and monitoring and reviewing relevant laws, regulations, and policies for the purpose of advocacy.

Between 2001 and 2020, the RIAA spent between $2.4 million and $6.5 million annually on lobbying in the United States. The organization ramped up its lobbying efforts in 2025, partly in response to artificial intelligence.

The RIAA also participates in the collective rights management of sound recordings, and it is responsible for certifying gold and platinum albums and singles in the United States, a system that was the first of its kind in the global music industry and set the standard for music recording certification worldwide.

== Company structure and sales ==
Mitch Glazier has been the RIAA's chairman and CEO since 2019. Glazier joined the RIAA in 2000 and has played a role in the music industry's transition to streaming and "anywhere, anytime" access to music. He was the RIAA's senior executive vice president from 2011 to 2019 and served as executive vice president for public policy and industry relations from 2000 to 2011.

As of 2018, the RIAA's 26-member board of directors is composed of these record executives:

- Mitch Glazier (Recording Industry Association of America)
- Michele Ballantyne (Recording Industry Association of America)
- Michele Anthony (Universal Music Group)
- Glen Barros (Exceleration Music)
- Michael L. Nash (Universal Music Group)
- Eric Berman (Universal Music Group)
- David Bither (Nonesuch Records)
- Ken Bunt (Disney Music Group)
- John Esposito (Warner Music Nashville)
- Victor Gonzalez (Universal Music Latin Entertainment)
- Camille Hackney (Atlantic Records)
- Rani Hancock (Sire Records)
- Jeff Harleston (Universal Music Group)
- Terry Hemmings (Provident Music Group/Sony Music Entertainment)
- Kevin Kelleher (Sony Music Entertainment)
- Sheldra Khahaifa (Sony Music Entertainment)
- Dennis Kooker (Sony Music Entertainment)
- Eric Chopra (Sony Music Entertainment)
- Annie Lee (Interscope Geffen A&M)
- Gabriela Maartinez (Warner Music Latina)
- Deirdre McDonald (Sony Music Entertainment)
- Paul Robinson (Warner Music Group)
- Tom Silverman (Tommy Boy Entertainment)
- Julie Swidler (Sony Music Entertainment)
- Will Tanous (Universal Music Group)
- Zena White (Partisan Records)

The RIAA represents over 1,600 member labels, which are private corporate entities such as record labels and distributors, and collectively create and distribute about 90% of recorded music sold in the United States. The largest and most influential of the members are the "Big Three":

- Sony Music
- Universal Music Group
- Warner Music Group

Within the major three music groups, it represents high-profile record labels such as Atlantic, Capitol, RCA, Warner, Columbia, and Motown.

The RIAA reports that total retail value of recordings sold by their members was $10.4 billion at the end of 2007, a decline from $14.6 billion in 1999. Estimated retail revenues from recorded music in the United States grew 11.4% in 2016 to $7.7 billion.

== Sales certification ==
The RIAA operates an award program for albums that sell a large number of copies. The award was launched in 1958; originally, the requirement for a Gold single was one million units sold and a Gold album represented $1 million in sales (at wholesale value, around a third of the list price). In 1975, the additional requirement of 500,000 units sold was added for Gold albums. Reflecting growth in record sales, the Platinum award was added in 1976, for albums able to sell one million units, while singles qualify upon selling two million units. The Multi-Platinum award was introduced in 1984, signifying multiple Platinum levels of albums and singles. In 1989, the sales thresholds for singles were reduced to 500,000 for Gold and 1,000,000 for Platinum, reflecting a decrease in sales of singles. In 1992, the RIAA began counting each disc in a multi-disc set as one unit toward certification; meaning, for example, an album that contains two records or discs are counted as two copies sold of the album instead of one. Albums containing one record or disc still count as one copy of the album sold. Reflecting additional growth in music sales in the United States, the Diamond award was instituted in 1999 for albums or singles selling ten million units with the United States alone. Because of these changes in criteria, the sales level associated with a particular award may depend on when the certification was made.

Since 2000, the RIAA also operates a similar program for Latin music sales, called Los Premios de Oro y De Platino. Currently, a "Disco De Oro" (Gold) is awarded for 30,000 units, and a "Disco De Platino" is awarded for 60,000 units. Further, the "Album Multi-Platino" honor is awarded at 120,000, and "Diamante" requires 10 times as many units as "Platino" (600,000). The RIAA defines "Latin music" as a type of release with 51% or more of its content recorded in Spanish.

=== "Digital" single certification ===
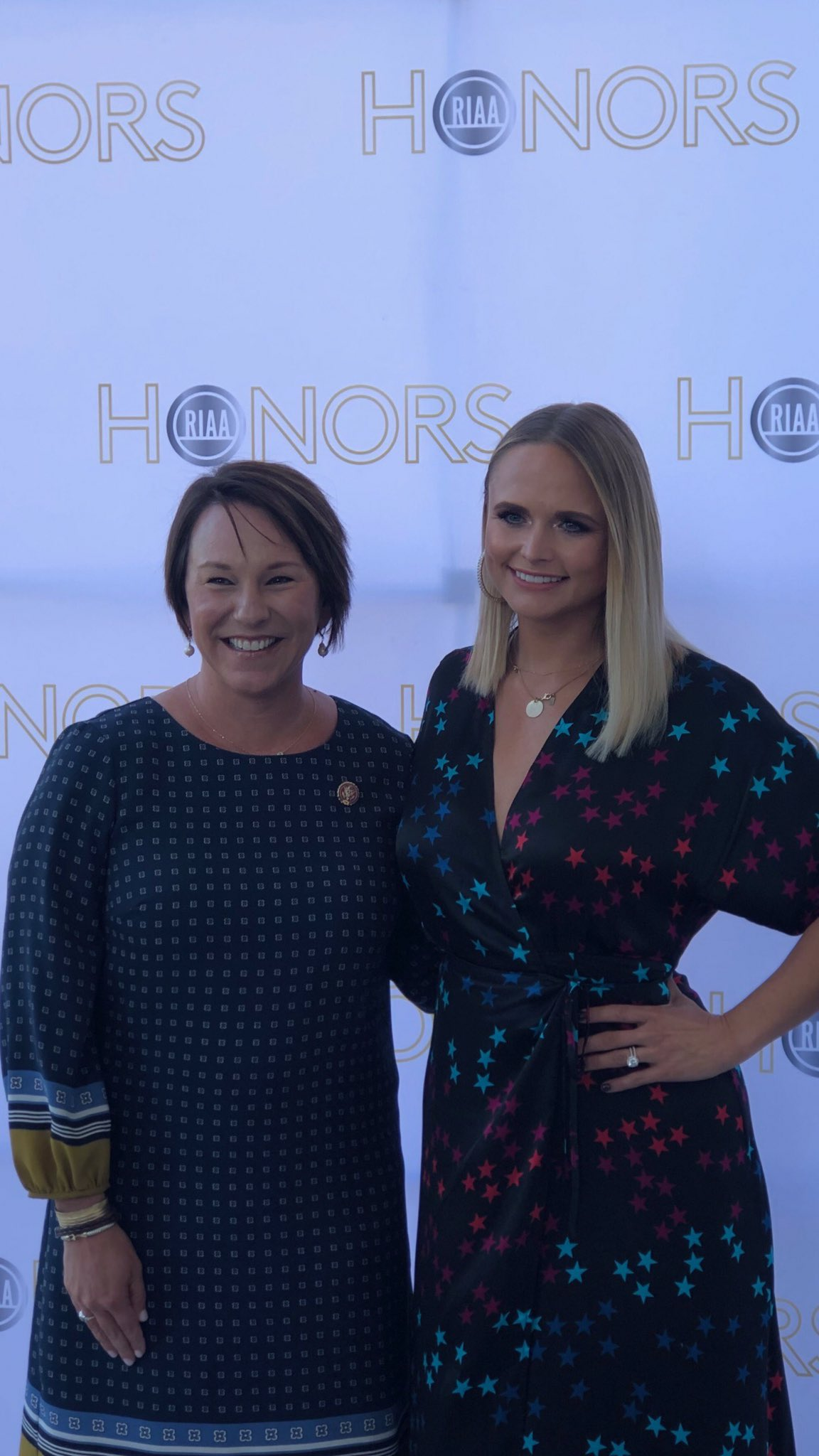
US representative Martha Roby, and Miranda Lambert, who was the RIAA's 2019 Artist of the Year, at an RIAA event in Washington, DC, in 2019

In 2004, the RIAA added a branch of certification for what it calls "digital" recordings, essentially referring to "recordings transferred to the recipient over a network" (such as those sold via the iTunes Store) yet excluding other obviously digital media such as those on CD, DAT, or MiniDisc. In 2006, "digital ringtones" were added to this branch of certification. Starting in 2013, streaming from audio and video streaming services such as Spotify, Napster, YouTube and the likes also began to be counted towards the certification, using the formula of 100 streams being the equivalent of one download; thus, RIAA certification for singles no longer reflects actual sales. In the same year, the RIAA introduced the Latin Digital Award for digital recordings in Spanish. As of 2016, the certification criteria for these recordings are:

Digital awards:

- Gold: 500,000 units
- Platinum: 1,000,000 units
- Multi-Platinum: 2,000,000 units (increments of 1,000,000 thereafter)
- Diamond: 10,000,000 units

The units are defined as:

1. A permanent digital download counts as 1 unit
2. 150 on-demand audio or video streams count as 1 unit

Latin digital awards:

- Disco de Oro (Gold): 30,000 copies
- Disco de Platino (Platinum): 60,000 copies
- Disco de Multi-Platino (Multi-Platinum): 120,000 copies

=== Album certification ===
In February 2016, the RIAA updated its certification criteria for album-level awards to combine streaming and track sales using the formula for album-equivalent unit.

- Gold: 500,000 units
- Platinum: 1,000,000 units
- Multi-Platinum: 2,000,000 units (increments of 1,000,000 thereafter)
- Diamond: 10,000,000 units

For certification purposes, each unit may be one of:

1. sale of a digital album or physical album
2. 10 track downloads from the album
3. 1,500 on-demand audio or video streams from the album

=== Video longform certification ===
Along with albums, digital albums, and singles, another classification of music release is called "video longform". This release format includes DVD and VHS releases. Further, certain live albums and compilation albums are counted. The certification criteria are slightly different from other styles.

- Gold: 50,000 copies
- Platinum: 100,000 copies
- Multi-Platinum: 200,000 copies

=== Music and Sports ===
The Chicago Bears of the National Football League are the only professional sports team in the world to have scored a Gold certification for a song. The 1985 Bears team were certified for sales of over 500,000 copies for their single "The Super Bowl Shuffle". The team is also the only sports team in history to score a Billboard Hot 100 hit when that song peaked at number 41 on the chart, and is the only team to receive a Grammy nomination when the song was nominated for Best R&B Performance by a Duo or Group with Vocals at the 29th Annual Grammy Awards in 1987.

== Efforts against alleged infringement of members' copyrights ==
=== Efforts against file sharing ===
The RIAA opposes unauthorized sharing of its members' music. Studies conducted since the association began its campaign against peer-to-peer file-sharing have concluded that losses incurred per download range from negligible to moderate.

The association has commenced high-profile lawsuits against file-sharing service providers. Likewise, it has sued individuals suspected of file sharing, notably college students, parents of file-sharing children and at least one dead person. It is accused of employing techniques such as peer-to-peer "decoying" and "spoofing" to combat file sharing.

In late 2008, they announced they would stop their lawsuits, and instead attempt to work with ISPs to persuade them to use a three-strike system for file sharing involving issuing two warnings and then cutting off Internet service after the third strike.

==== Selection of defendants ====
The RIAA names defendants based on ISP identification of the subscriber associated with an IP address, and as such do not know any additional information about a person before they sue. After an Internet subscriber's identity is discovered, but before an individual lawsuit is filed, the subscriber is typically offered an opportunity to settle. The standard settlement is a payment to the RIAA and an agreement not to engage in file sharing of music. Such suits are also usually on par with statutory damages of $750 per work, with the RIAA choosing the number of works it deems "reasonable". For cases that do not settle at this amount, the RIAA has gone to trial, seeking statutory damages from the jury, written into The Digital Theft Deterrence and Copyright Damages Improvement Act of 1999 as between $750 and $30,000 per work or $750 and $150,000 per work if "willful".

The Electronic Frontier Foundation and Public Citizen oppose the ability of the RIAA and other companies to "strip Internet users of anonymity without allowing them to challenge the order in court". In the past, U.S. courts have declared that an IP address is not a person nor personal identifier. This weakened the RIAA's ability to sue individuals.

The RIAA's methods of identifying individual users had, in some rare cases, led to the issuing of subpoenas to persons dead or otherwise incapable of file-sharing. Two such examples include: a then-recently deceased 83-year-old woman an elderly computer novice, and a family reportedly without any computer at all.

==== Settlement programs ====
In February 2007, the RIAA began sending letters accusing Internet users of sharing files and directing them to web site P2PLAWSUITS.COM, where they can make "discount" settlements payable by credit card. The letters go on to say that anyone not settling will have lawsuits brought against them. Typical settlements are between $3,000 and $12,000. This new strategy was formed because the RIAA's legal fees were cutting into the income from settlements. In 2008, the RIAA sued 19-year-old Ciara Sauro for allegedly sharing 10 songs online.The RIAA also launched an "early settlement program" directed to ISPs and to colleges and universities, urging them to pass along letters to subscribers and students offering early settlements, prior to the disclosure of their identities. The settlement letters urged ISPs to preserve evidence for the benefit of the RIAA and invited the students and subscribers to visit an RIAA website for the purpose of entering into a "discount settlement" payable by credit card. By March 2007, the focus had shifted from ISPs to colleges and universities.

In October 1998, the RIAA filed a lawsuit in the Ninth U.S. Court of Appeals in San Francisco claiming the Diamond Multimedia Rio PMP300 player violated the 1992 Audio Home Recording Act. The Rio PMP300 was significant because it was the second portable consumer MP3 digital audio player released on the market. The three-judge panel ruled in favor of Diamond, paving the way for the development of the portable digital player market.

In 2003, the RIAA sued college student developers of LAN search engines Phynd and Flatlan, describing them as "a sophisticated network designed to enable widespread music thievery".

In September 2003, the RIAA filed suit in civil court against several private individuals who had shared large numbers of files with Kazaa. Most of these suits were settled with monetary payments averaging $3,000. Kazaa publisher Sharman Networks responded with a lawsuit against the RIAA, alleging that the terms of use of the network were violated and that unauthorized client software was used in the investigation to track down the individual file sharers (such as Kazaa Lite). An effort to throw out this suit was denied in January 2004, but that suit was settled in 2006. Sharman Networks agreed to a global settlement of litigation brought against it by the Motion Picture Association of America, the International Federation of the Phonographic Industry, and by the RIAA. The creators of the popular Kazaa file-sharing network would pay $115 million to the RIAA, plus unspecified future amounts to MPAA and the software industry; and, they would install filters on its networks to prevent users from sharing copyrighted works on its network.

The RIAA also filed suit in 2006 to enjoin digital XM Satellite Radio from enabling its subscribers from playing songs they had recorded from its satellite broadcasts. It is also suing several Internet radio stations. Later, XM was forced to impose an industry fee upon subscribers. The fee still exists and has always been paid, in-full, directly to the RIAA.

On October 12, 2007, the RIAA sued Usenet.com seeking a permanent injunction to prevent the company from "aiding, encouraging, enabling, inducing, causing, materially contributing to, or otherwise facilitating" copyright infringement. This suit, the first that the RIAA has filed against a Usenet provider, has added another branch to the RIAA's rapidly expanding fight to curb the unauthorized distribution of copyrighted materials. Unlike many of the RIAA's previous lawsuits, this suit was filed against the provider of a service. Providers have no direct means of removing infringing content. The RIAA's argument relies heavily on the fact the Usenet.com, the only defendant that had been named, promoted their service with slogans and phrases that strongly suggested that the service could be used to obtain free music.

On April 28, 2008, RIAA member labels sued Project Playlist, a web music search site, claiming that most of the sound recordings in the site's index of links are infringing. Project Playlist's website denies that any of the music is hosted on Project Playlist's own servers.

On June 30, 2009, the RIAA prevailed in its fight against Usenet.com, in a decision, that the U.S. District Judge Harold Baer of the Southern District of New York ruled in favor of the music industry on all its main arguments: that Usenet.com was guilty of direct, contributory, and vicarious infringement. In addition, and perhaps most importantly for future cases, Baer said that Usenet.com cannot claim protection under the Sony Betamax decision. That ruling states that companies cannot be held liable for contributory infringement if the device they create is "capable of significant noninfringing uses". Furthermore, the parties had appealed to a federal court for damage assessments and awards, which could amount to several millions of dollars for the music industry.

On October 26, 2010, RIAA members won a case against LimeWire, a P2P file-sharing network, for illegal distribution of copyrighted works. On October 29, in retaliation, riaa.org was taken offline via denial-of-service attacks executed by members of Operation Payback and Anonymous.

=== Advocacy ===
The RIAA filed briefs in Allen v. Cooper, which was decided in 2020. The Supreme Court of the United States abrogated the Copyright Remedy Clarification Act as unconstitutional, while the RIAA had argued the opposite view.

In 2025, the RIAA ramped up its lobbying efforts to counter the impact of artificial intelligence on creative work and ensure copyright protection across digital platforms. The organization spent more than $2.5 million in the first quarter of 2025.

=== The "work made for hire" controversy ===
In 1999, Mitch Glazier, a Congressional staff attorney, inserted, without public notice or comment, substantive language into the final markup of a "technical corrections" section of copyright legislation, classifying many music recordings as "works made for hire", thereby stripping artists of their copyright interests and transferring those interests to their record labels. Shortly afterwards, Glazier was hired as Senior Vice President of Government Relations and Legislative Counsel for the RIAA, which vigorously defended the change when it came to light. The battle over the disputed provision led to the formation of the Recording Artists' Coalition, which successfully lobbied for repeal of the change.

=== GitHub and youtube-dl takedown request ===
On October 23, 2020, the code repository hosting service GitHub (owned by Microsoft) released a DMCA request from the RIAA. This request listed the open-source software project youtube-dl (and forks of the project) as copyright violations. The request cited the United States law Title 17 U.S.C. §1201. Critics of this action say that the software library can be used by archivists to download videos of social injustice. According to Parker Higgins, former Director of Copyright Activism at the Electronic Frontier Foundation (EFF), this takedown request was a "throwback threat" analogous to the DeCSS controversy.

=== NFT takedown requests ===
On February 4, 2022, Mitch Glazier swiftly took action against NFT scam site HitPiece. The site had allegedly stole music to mint as NFTs, and host them on their site. Since then, HitPiece has only responded with "We Started The Conversation And We're Listening." However, their site has not been updated since.

== Criticism ==
The RIAA is heavily criticized for both policy and for their method of suing individuals for copyright infringement. Particularly strong critic-advocates are Internet-based, such as the Electronic Frontier Foundation and Students for Free Culture. In 2006, the Electronic Frontier Foundation noted that within the preceding three years, the RIAA had sued more than 20,000 people in the United States suspected of distributing copyrighted works. Of these, approximately 2,500 were settled pre-trial. Brad Templeton of the Electronic Frontier Foundation has called these types of lawsuits spamigation and implied they are done merely to intimidate people.

== Executive leadership of the RIAA ==
- Goddard Lieberson, 1964–1972 (president)
- Stanley Gortikov, 1972–1987 (president)
- Jay Berman, 1988–1998 (president and chair)
- Hilary Rosen, 1998–2001 (president)
- Mitch Bainwol, 2003–2011 (chairman and CEO)
- Cary Sherman, 2011–2019 (chairman and CEO)
- Mitch Glazier, 2019–present (chairman and CEO)

== See also ==
- RIAA equalization (RIAA curve)
- Center for Copyright Information
- Federal Communications Commission
- Global music industry market share data
- International Intellectual Property Alliance
- Music Canada
- Parental Advisory
- Strategic lawsuit against public participation
