= Phynd =

Phynd (Find) is a LAN-indexing search engine used to facilitate peer-to-peer file sharing over a local-area network. It was developed by Rensselaer Polytechnic Institute student researcher Jesse Jordan to solve various problems experienced by Microsoft browsers and networks when trying to index files within a large network.

One of the results of Jordan's file indexing exercise was that large numbers of downloaded music files were found on other users' local systems. Jordan was relatively unconcerned with the nature of the content he was indexing. His objective was enabling a network to index all its files without crashing any elements of the network.

Although Jordan's search engine, Phynd, merely indexed public data that users elected to share through an integrated sharing feature in Microsoft Windows, Jordan was sued by RIAA for copyright infringement. The original Phynd search engine, rpi.phynd.net (defunct), existing years before and months after Jesse's lawsuit was shut down by the enormous pressure that the RIAA in November 2003 brought upon Jordan and his family. The RIAA was demanding $15,000,000 to settle. As a student researcher, Jordan had only modest life savings of approximately $12,000, and his family had only modest assets. His limited options were to fight the RIAA at enormous personal expense, or to settle. Jordan, chose to settle outside of court for $12,000, his entire life savings from student employment. He subsequently raised $12,005.67 via contributions on a personal web site in July 2003.
