= Recording Artists' Coalition =

The Recording Artists' Coalition (RAC) is an American music industry organization that represents recording artists, and attempts to defend their rights and interests. Compare and contrast with the RIAA, which represents the recording industry. In 2009, it became an element of the National Academy of Recording Arts and Sciences. Their most vocal and energetic actions have been in support of repealing laws which tie artists to contracts with record labels for seven years, and in successfully lobbying to repeal supposedly "technical revisions" to American copyright statutes which shifted ownership of some copyrights from artists to record labels.

== See also ==
- American Federation of Musicians
