= 1984 Maine Democratic presidential caucuses =

- March 4, 1984

27 delegates to the Democratic National Convention (Note: First stage of caucus to select delegates to then select 3,295 delegates on May 6)
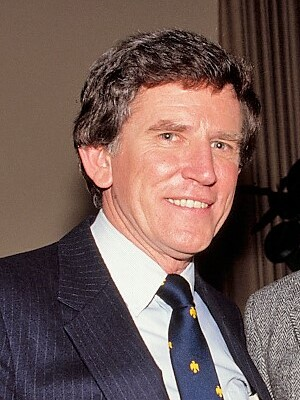

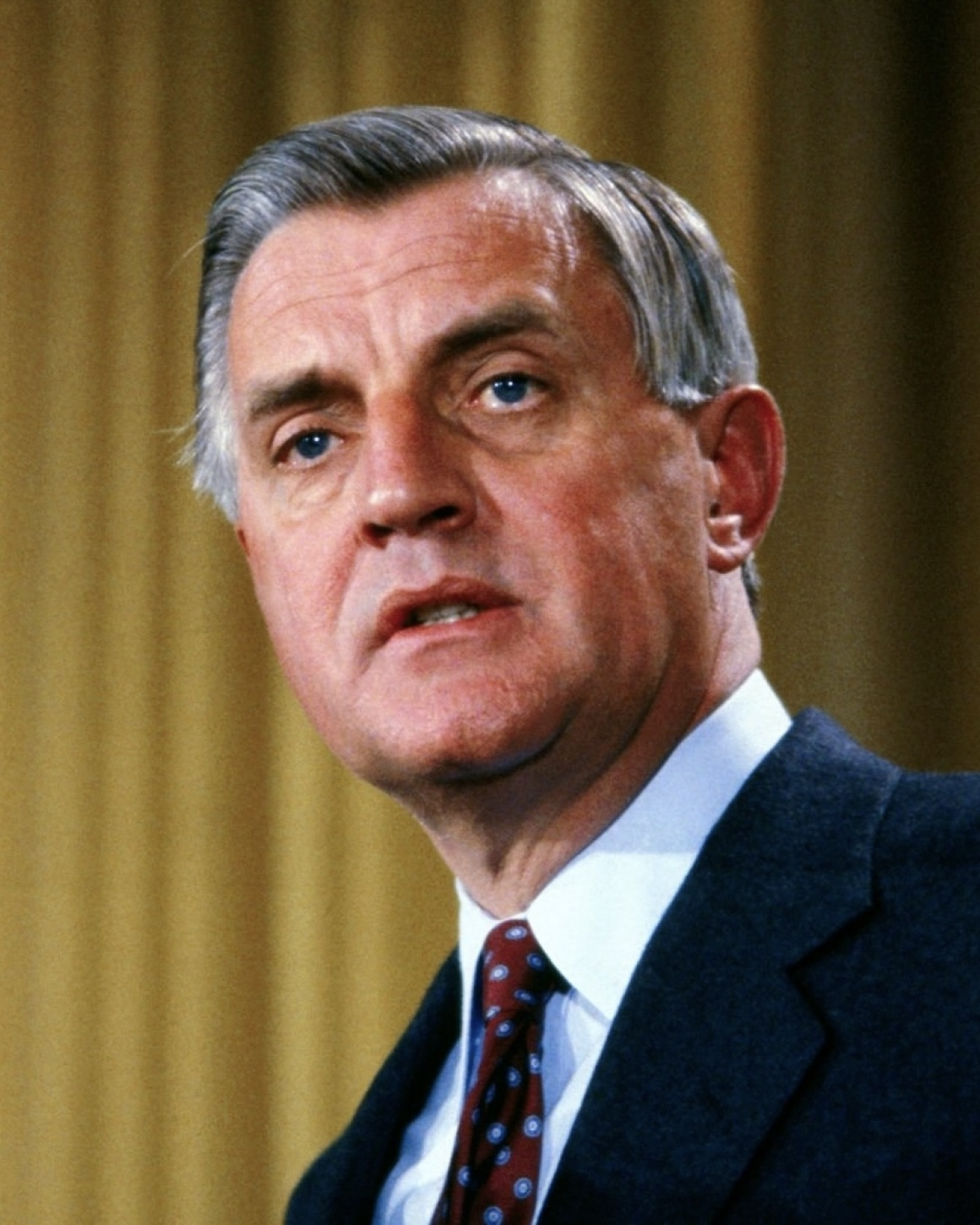
| Candidate | Gary Hart | Walter Mondale |
| Home state | Colorado | Minnesota |
| Delegate count | 13 | 12 |
| Popular vote | 8,540 | 7,364 |
| Percentage | 50.71% | 43.73% |

The 1984 Maine Democratic presidential caucuses were held on March 4, 1984, as part of the 1984 United States Democratic Party presidential primaries for the 1984 United States presidential election. 27 delegates were allocated to presidential candidates. (Note: First stage of caucus to select delegates to then select 3,295 delegates on May 6)

U.S. Senator Gary Hart won the contest by 13 delegates and 8,540 popular votes, marking his second win since the New Hampshire primary on February 28.

== Delegates ==
Precinct caucuses were held on March 4, to select delegates who would attend conventions on May 6. The conventions would select delegates for conventions, where 27 delegates would be selected.

Previously, Iowa also had no delegates until 34 delegates be selected from Iowa state's six congressional districts to vote in April 7, this state moved its caucus to February 20, in violation of the DNC rules, New Hampshire also violated the rules when it moved its caucus to February 28, many controversies broke out.

== Results ==
Gary Hart, U.S. Senator from Colorado, won the contest by popular votes, he received 8,540 popular votes (50.71%). Former Vice President Walter Mondale received 7,364 popular votes (43.73%), other candidates, Jesse Jackson received 105 popular votes (0.62%), John Glenn received 52 popular votes (0.31%) and Uncommitted (voting option) received 602 popular votes (3.57%).

After the convention on May 6, Hart received 13 delegates, Mondale received 12 delegates and Uncommitted received 2 delegates. Hart continued to win.

Maine Democratic caucus, March 4, 1984
| Candidate | Votes | Percentage | Actual delegate count | | |
| Candidate | Votes | Percentage | Pledged | Unpledged | Total |
|---|---|---|---|---|---|
| Gary Hart | 8,540 | 50.71% | 13 | | 13 |
| Walter Mondale | 7,364 | 43.73% | 12 | | 12 |
| Jesse Jackson | 105 | 0.62% | | | |
| Uncommitted (voting option) | 602 | 3.57% | 2 | | 2 |
| George McGovern | 178 | 1.06% | | | |
| Total: | 16,841 | 100% | 27 | | 27 |

== See also ==
- 1984 Democratic Party presidential primaries
- 1984 Republican Party presidential primaries
- 1984 United States presidential election in Maine
