= 1984 Democratic Party presidential primaries =

Selection of the Democratic Party nominee

- February 20 to June 12, 1984

3,933 delegates to the Democratic National Convention 1,967 (majority) votes needed to win
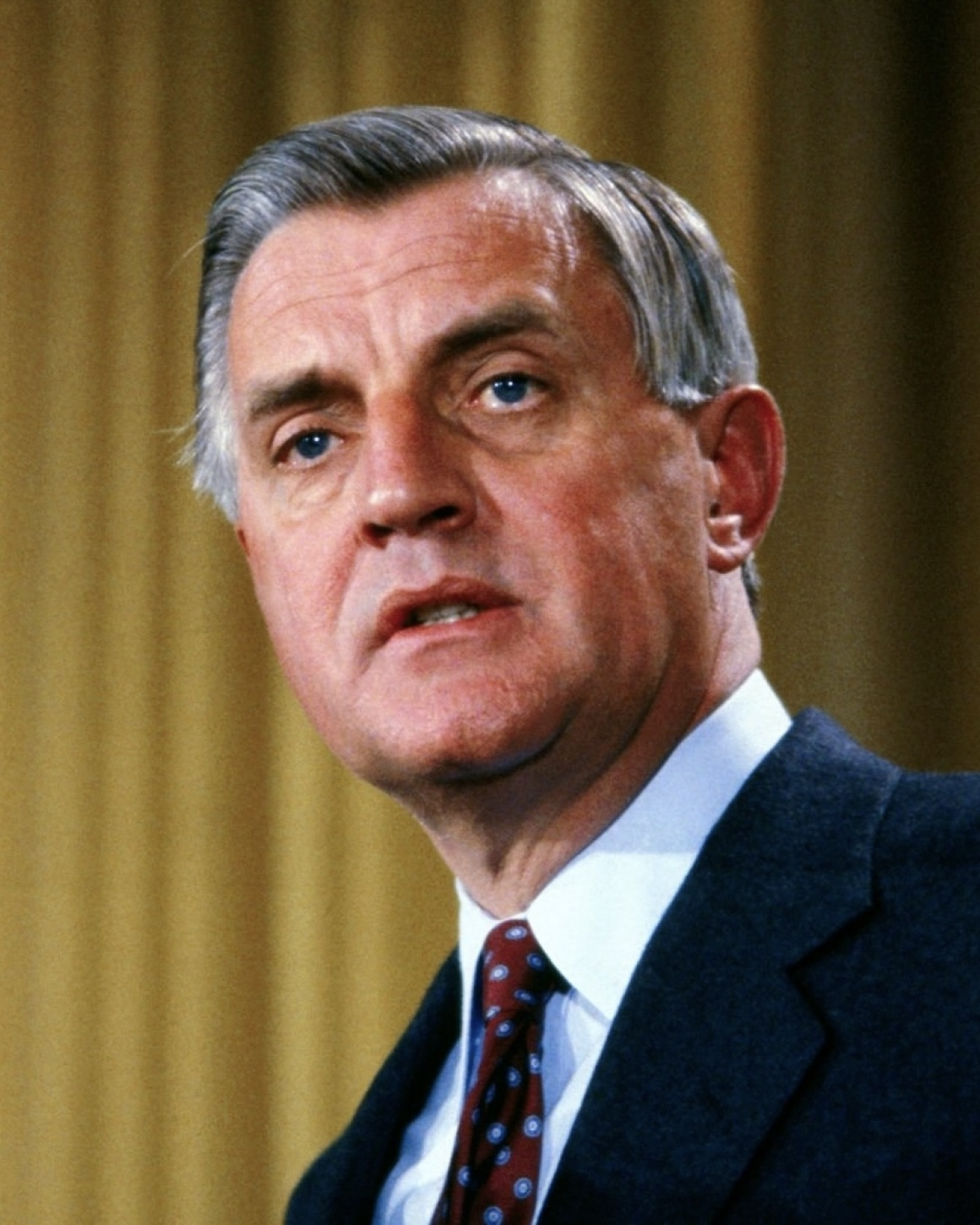

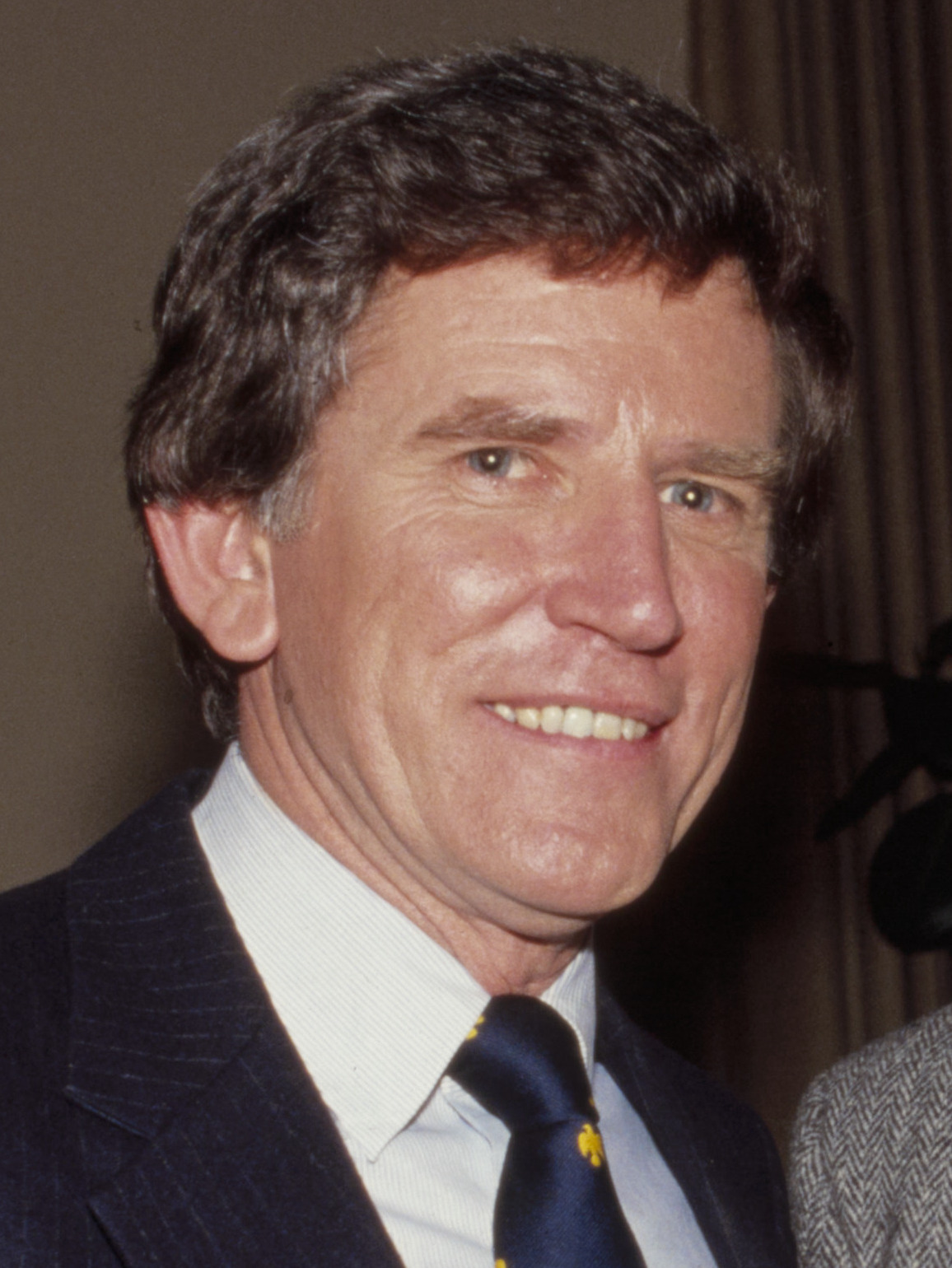

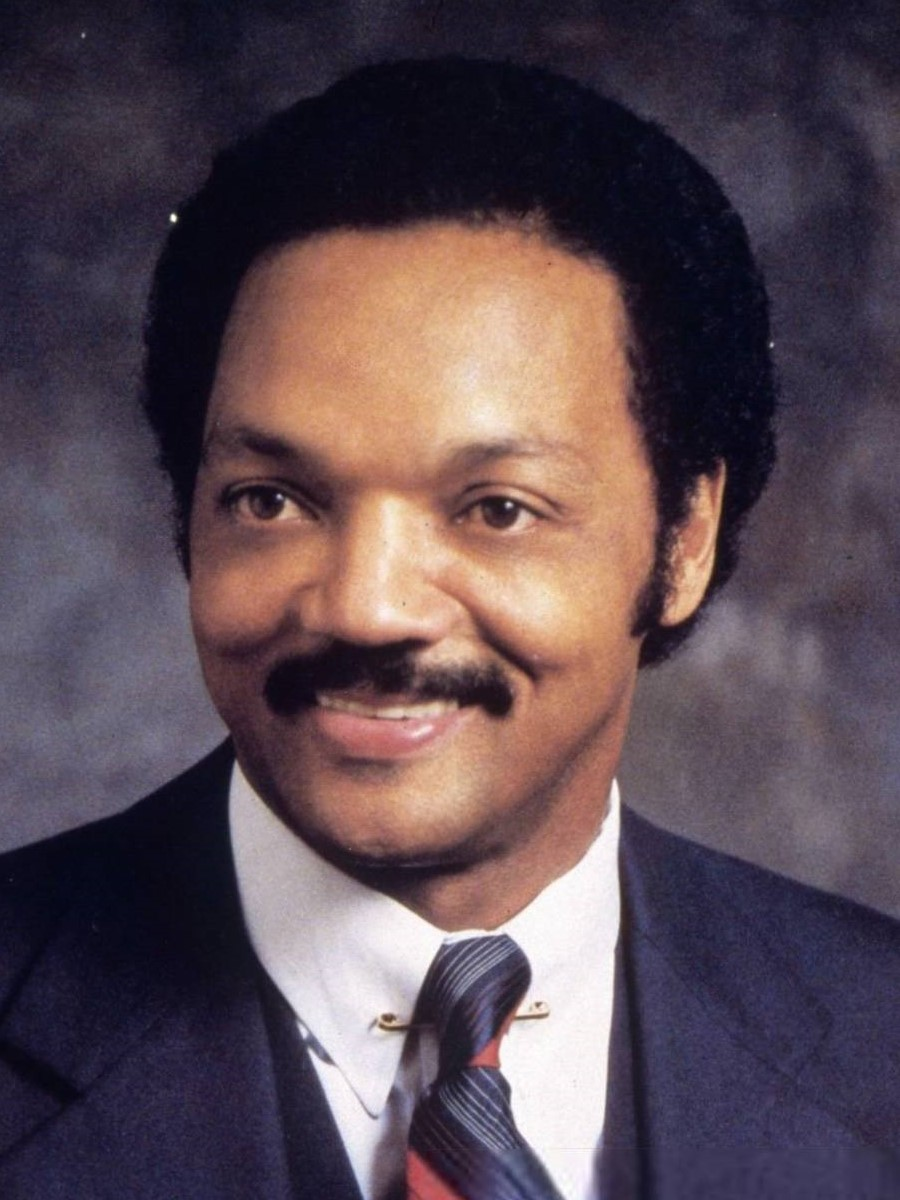
Candidate	Walter Mondale	Gary Hart	Jesse Jackson
Home state	Minnesota	Colorado	Illinois
Delegate count	1,708 PDs; 384 SDs	1,198 PDs; 58 SDs	364 PDs; 25 SDs
Contests won	26	26	2
Popular vote	6,952,912	6,504,842	3,282,431
Percentage	38.3%	35.9%	18.1%
- Mondale Hart Jackson Uncommitted
Previous Democratic nominee
Jimmy Carter
Democratic nominee
Walter Mondale

From February 20 to June 12, 1984, voters of the Democratic Party chose its nominee for president in the 1984 United States presidential election. Former Vice President Walter Mondale was selected as the nominee through a series of primary elections and caucuses culminating in the 1984 Democratic National Convention held from July 16 to July 19, 1984, in San Francisco, California.

== Background ==
The Commission on Presidential Nomination was formed in July 1981, under the leadership of Jim Hunt. The commission sought to increase the power of elected officials, who could choose a more moderate and ideologically representative candidate. Alan Cranston, Gillis William Long, and Walter Mondale supported giving elected officials positions as uncommitted delegates while Ted Kennedy opposed it. The report was completed on February 5, 1982. The commission allocated 568 delegates, 14% of the total, to unelected superdelegates, who were party leaders and elected officials. The primary schedule was reduced to occur from March to June, with the exception of Iowa and New Hampshire.

411 of the superdelegates were elected officials and 157 were party officials. Members of the U.S. House and U.S. Senate accounted for 200 delegates. Mondale's campaign capitalized on this and Richard Moe, with 20 lobbyists, gained support for Mondale from members of Congress. Thomas Hale Boggs Jr. lobbied for congressional support for John Glenn.

Twenty-six primaries were held in 1984, less than the thirty-one in 1980. 54% of the delegates were selected using primaries which was a decline from the 72% in 1980, 32% was selected using caucuses, and the remainder were superdelegates. Ten states, six using a primary and four using a caucus, and Puerto Rico used a winner-take-all system. The minimum percentage needed to win delegates was raised from 15% to 20%.

== Candidates ==
=== Nominee ===
Candidate	Most recent office	Home state	Campaign	Popular vote	Contests won	Running mate
Walter Mondale	U.S. Vice President (1977–1981)	Minnesota	(Campaign)	6,952,912 (38.3%)	26 (AL, AR, DE, GA, IL, IA, KS, MD, MI, MN, MS, MO, NJ, NY, NC, PA, TN, TX, VA, WV, WI-C, AS, GU, PR, VI, DA)	Geraldine; Ferraro

=== Eliminated at Convention ===
Candidate	Most recent office	Home state	Campaign Withdrawal date	Popular vote	Contests won
Gary Hart	U.S. Senator from Colorado (1975–1987)	Colorado	Eliminated at Convention: July 18, 1984; Endorsed Mondale: July 19, 1984 (Campaign)	6,504,842 (35.9%)	26 (AK, AZ, CA, CO, CT, FL, ID-P, ID-C, IN, ME, MA, MT, NE, NV, NH, NM, OH, OK, OR, RI, SD, UT, VT, WA, WI-P, WY)
Jesse Jackson	President of PUSH (1971–2023)	South Carolina	Eliminated at Convention: July 18, 1984; Endorsed Mondale: August 28, 1984 (Campaign)	3,282,431 (18.1%)	2 (DC, LA)

=== Withdrew during Primaries ===
Candidate	Most recent office	Home state	Campaign Withdrawal date	Popular vote	Contests won
John Glenn	U.S. Senator from Ohio (1974–1999)	Ohio	Withdrew: March 16, 1984; Endorsed Mondale: July 18, 1984 (Campaign)	617,909 (3.41%)	0
George McGovern	U.S. Senator from South Dakota (1963–1981)	South Dakota	Withdrew: March 14, 1984; Endorsed Mondale: June 13, 1984 (Campaign)	334,801 (1.85%)	0
Reubin Askew	Governor of Florida (1971–1979)	Florida	Withdrew: March 1, 1984; Endorsed Mondale: July 18, 1984 (Campaign)	52,759 (0.29%)	0
Fritz Hollings	U.S. Senator from South Carolina (1966–2005)	South Carolina	Withdrew: March 1, 1984; Endorsed Hart: March 9, 1984 (Campaign)	33,684 (0.19%)	0
Alan Cranston	U.S. Senator from California (1969–1993)	California	Withdrew: February 29, 1984; Endorsed Mondale: July 18, 1984 (Campaign)	51,437 (0.28%)	0

=== Minor Candidates ===
Lyndon LaRouche	Claude R. Kirk Jr.	Gerald Willis
No Elected Office	Governor of Florida (1967–1971)	State Representative from Alabama (1978–1982)

=== Declined to run ===
George Wallace	Jimmy Carter	Ted Kennedy	Daniel Patrick Moynihan	Lloyd Bentsen
Governor of Alabama (1963–1967, 1971–1979, 1983–1987)	U.S. President from Georgia (1977–1981)	U.S. Senator from Massachusetts (1962–2009)	U.S. Senator from New York (1977–2001)	U.S. Senator from Texas (1971–1993)
May 22, 1982	October 25, 1982	December 1, 1982	December 3, 1982	December 4, 1982 (Note: This is an approximation; a source with a hard date was not found)
Bill Bradley	Mo Udall	Dale Bumpers	Jerry Brown	John Y. Brown Jr.
U.S. Senator from New Jersey (1979–1997)	U.S. Representative from Arizona (1961–1991)	U.S. Senator from Arkansas (1975–1999)	Governor of California (1975–1983, 2011–2019)	Governor of Kentucky (1979–1983)
January 11, 1983	February 9, 1983	April 5, 1983	April 20, 1983	

== Timeline ==
=== Overview and pre-contests ===
Nominee
Ended campaigns
Iowa caucuses
New Hampshire primary
Super Tuesday
Convention 1984

Kennedy, one of the leading possible candidates, announced in December 1982, that he would not run for the presidential nomination.

In June 1983, Cranston won a series of straw polls in Alabama, California, and Wisconsin and placed second in Massachusetts. Mondale won a straw poll in Maine in October. Glenn criticized the excessive spending on the straw poll as Cranston and Mondale both spent $100,000 and Hollings spent $25,000 while campaigning for it.

Jackson ended up winning 21% of the national primary vote but received only 8% of the delegates to the national convention, and he initially charged that his campaign was hurt by the same party rules that allowed Mondale to win. He also poured scorn on Mondale, saying that Hubert Humphrey was the "last significant politician out of the St. Paul-Minneapolis" area.

Colorado Senator Gary Hart was little-known when he announced his run February 1983, and barely received above 1% in the polls compared to other well-known figures. To counter this, Hart started campaigning early in New Hampshire, making a then-unprecedented canvassing tour in late September, months before the primary. This strategy attracted national media attention to his campaign, and by late 1983, he had risen moderately in the polls to the middle of the field, mostly at the expense of the sinking candidacies of John Glenn and Cranston.

Hart criticized Mondale as an "old-fashioned" Great Society Democrat who symbolized "failed policies" of the past. Hart positioned himself as a younger, fresher, and more moderate Democrat who could appeal to younger voters. He emerged as a formidable candidate, winning the key Ohio and California primaries as well as several others, especially in the West. However, Hart could not overcome Mondale's financial and organizational advantages, especially among labor union leaders in the Midwest and industrial Northeast. Hart was also badly hurt during a televised debate when Mondale used a popular television commercial slogan to ridicule Hart's vague "New Ideas" platform. Turning to Hart on camera, Mondale said that whenever he heard Hart talk about his "New Ideas", he was reminded of the Wendy's fast-food slogan "Where's the beef?". The remark drew loud laughter and applause from the audience and caught Hart off-guard. Hart never fully recovered from Mondale's charge that his "New Ideas" were shallow and lacking in specifics. Earlier in the same Democratic primary debate, Hart committed a serious faux pas that largely went underreported. Asked what he would do if an unidentified airplane flew over the Iron Curtain from a Warsaw Pact nation, Hart replied that he would send up a United States Air Force plane and instruct them to determine whether or not it was an enemy plane by looking in the cockpit window to see if the pilots were wearing uniforms. Fellow candidate John Glenn, a former Marine Corps fighter pilot, replied that this was physically impossible.

At a roundtable debate between the three remaining Democratic candidates moderated by Phil Donahue, Mondale and Hart got in such a heated argument over the issue of U.S. policy in Central America that Jackson had to tap his water glass on the table to get them to simmer down.

Jackson's campaign was bolstered after he led a delegation to Syria that convinced Hafez al-Assad to release Bobby Goodman in January 1984. Jackson received large and overwhelming positive news coverage. However, positive news coverage ended after he called Jews "Hymies" and New York City "Hymietown". Jackson was also criticized for his relation with Louis Farrakhan.

=== Early contests ===
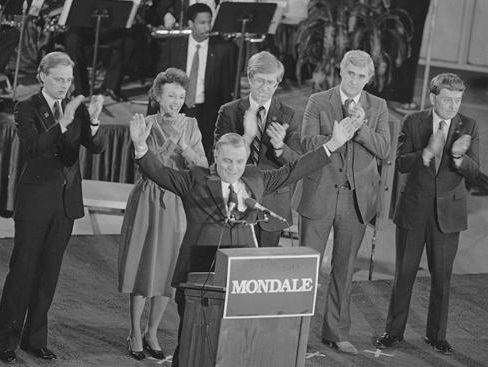
Mondale celebrates his victory in the Iowa caucus

Mondale won the Iowa caucus with a plurality of the vote. Glenn performed poorly and came in sixth. Hart's campaign was bolstered by his second place showing. Hart, despite not winning Iowa, was now viewed as the only viable opponent to Mondale. Hart was polling below 10% nationally in late February, but was polling above 30% by March 2, and near 40% by March 6.

Mondale led Glenn by two-to-one in New Hampshire and Glenn led Hart by two-to-one in New Hampshire in polling from March 1983 to February 1984. However, Hart's polling improved shortly before the primary and won in New Hampshire. Mondale and Hart both won 6 delegates, despite Hart's popular vote victory, due to mathematical distribution.

Reubin Askew, Alan Cranston, and Fritz Hollings ended their campaigns after their poor results in New Hampshire. Hart had incomplete delegate slates, such as him having 45 delegates slated for the 117 delegates up in Pennsylvania's primary. Hart adopted the delegate slates of withdrawn campaigns.

=== March contests ===
Glenn's campaign stated that he needed to win Alabama and perform well in Georgia. Mondale won the statewide popular vote in Georgia, but Hart won in more congressional districts and won a plurality of the state's delegates.

Alabama, Florida, Georgia, Massachusetts, Rhode Island, and Illinois held their contests with a total of 510 delegates on March 13 as a part of Super Tuesday. The three leading candidates' delegate counts rose from 126 to 301 for Mondale, 17 to 164 for Hart, and 7 to 34 for Jackson.

Hollings was expected to win South Carolina as a favorite son candidate, but withdrew before the state held its caucus.

On March 31, the Kentucky precinct caucuses elected a plurality uncommitted delegation supported by Governor Martha Layne Collins. Mondale won the Virgin Islands caucus.

=== April contests ===
Hart won the Wisconsin primary, but none of the major candidates campaigned in the state due to the primary having no pledged delegates. Mondale won the caucus which was responsible for the allocation of 78 of the state's 89 delegates.

Mondale won strong victories in the New York and Pennsylvania primaries, solidifying his front runner status.

Louisiana cancelled its primary, as it was unable to afford the $1.5 million cost, and caucuses were held for both parties instead.

=== Last contests ===
On May 1, Jackson won Washington D.C. and Mondale won Tennessee. In order to gain the nomination Hart needed to win 91% of the remaining delegates after these contests.

Indiana, Maryland, North Carolina, and Ohio held their contests with a total of 483 delegates on May 8 as part of Super Tuesday II. Hart's surprise victories in Ohio and Indiana were a setback for Mondale, delaying him from clinching the nomination.

Mondale gradually pulled away from Hart in the delegate count, but the race was not decided until June, on Super Tuesday III. Decided that day were delegates from five states: South Dakota, New Mexico, West Virginia, and the big prizes of California and New Jersey. The proportional nature of delegate selection meant that Mondale was likely to obtain enough delegates on that day to secure the stated support of an overall majority of delegates, and hence the nomination, no matter who actually "won" the states contested. However, Hart maintained that unpledged superdelegates that had previously claimed support for Mondale would shift to his side if he swept the Super Tuesday III primary. Once again, Hart committed a faux pas, insulting New Jersey shortly before the primary day. Campaigning in California, he remarked that while the "bad news" was that he and his wife Lee had to campaign separately, "[t]he good news for her is that she campaigns in California while I campaign in New Jersey." Compounding the problem, when his wife interjected that she "got to hold a koala bear," Hart replied that "I won't tell you what I got to hold: samples from a toxic-waste dump." While Hart won California, he decisively lost New Jersey after leading in polls by as much as 15 points.

North Dakota held its first presidential primary, but no delegates were bound by it. Hart won the primary against Lyndon LaRouche, the only other candidate on the ballot.

McGovern endorsed Mondale on July 11, and instructed his 23 delegates to vote for Mondale. Mondale was already 28 delegates above the minimum required to win.

Mondale had the support of 81 state chairs and vice-chairs, Hart had 13, Jackson had 1, and 19 were uncommitted one week before the convention. The final CBS poll of delegates before the convention showed that among the superdelegates 384 supported Mondale, 58 supported Hart, 25 supported Jackson, and 101 were uncommitted.

=== Convention and aftermath ===
By the time the Democratic Convention started in San Francisco, Mondale had more than enough delegates to win the Democratic nomination. However, after Mondale's landslide loss to Ronald Reagan, Hart would quickly emerge as the frontrunner for the 1988 Democratic Party's presidential nomination. He would maintain that status until a sex scandal derailed his candidacy in 1987.

Mondale's nomination marked only the fifth time that the Democratic Party nominated a private citizen for President (i.e., not serving in an official government role at the time of the nomination and election), following former Georgia Governor Jimmy Carter in 1976, who followed former Illinois Governor Adlai Stevenson II in 1956, who followed former West Virginia Congressman John W. Davis in 1924, who was preceded by former President Grover Cleveland in 1892. The Democratic Party did not nominate another private citizen until former Secretary of State Hillary Clinton, in 2016. Four years later, the party nominated former vice president Joe Biden. Of the seven private-citizen Democratic nominees, Jimmy Carter, Grover Cleveland, and Joe Biden won their respective presidential elections.

== Analysis ==
Mondale performed best in states with primaries. Hart won more states than Mondale and performed better both in primaries, with 16 victories out of 27, and caucuses, with 13 victories out of 23, but he won in states with lower delegate counts and which allotted them proportionally. Mondale won four of the five winner-take-all states. His plurality victories gave him all of Pennsylvania's 80 delegates and 102 of New Jersey's 107 delegates. Mondale's strong support among superdelegates meant that the delegations of five states won by Hart (Massachusetts, Rhode Island, Indiana, Ohio, and New Mexico) were controlled by Mondale.

The delegate results were malapportioned when compared to the popular vote. If all of the contests used a proportional system then the results would have been 1,591 delegates for Mondale, 1,307 for Hart, 645 for Jackson, and 390 for others and uncommitted. This would have placed Mondale below the minimum number of delegates needed to win and doubled the number of Jackson's delegates.

Mondale lost all of New England and almost every state west of the Mississippi.

Two-thirds of the delegates attending the convention identified as liberals compared to 7% who identified as conservatives.

One-third of people who supported Hart during the Democratic primary voted for Reagan. 4% of Mondale supporters and 6% of Jackson supporters voted for Reagan.

The 1984 Democratic presidential primary vote by demographic subgroup
Demographic subgroup	Mondale	Hart	Jackson	Other	% of total vote
Total vote	38	36	18	8	100
Ideology
Moderates	41	37	15	7	47
Liberals	34	36	25	5	27
Conservatives	37	34	16	13	21
Party
Democrats	42	33	20	5	74
Independents	28	44	16	12	20
Gender
Men	38	36	17	9	46
Women	39	35	19	7	54
Race
White	42	43	5	10	78
Black	19	3	77	1	18
Age
18–29 years old	26	39	26	9	17
30–44 years old	30	38	23	9	30
45–59 years old	41	34	18	7	23
60 and older	52	31	10	7	28
Education
Less than high school	51	26	18	5	14
High school graduate	43	34	16	7	33
Some college	33	38	21	8	27
College graduate	31	41	20	8	26
Union households
Union	45	31	19	5	33

Source: Adam Clymer combined the exit polls conducted in 24 states by The New York Times, CBS, NBC, and ABC.

== Endorsements ==
List of Walter Mondale endorsements

Mondale had received endorsements from:

Executive Branch Officials

- Jimmy Carter, President of the United States from Georgia (1977–1981)
- Dean Rusk, United States Secretary of State from Georgia (1961–1969)

U.S. Senate

- Daniel Inouye, U.S. Senator from Hawaii (1963–2012)
- Patrick Leahy, U.S. Senator from Vermont (1975–2023)

U.S. House of Representatives

- Glenn M. Anderson, member of the U.S. House of Representatives from California (1969–1993) (previously endorsed Alan Cranston)
- Jim Bates, member of the U.S. House of Representatives from California's 44th congressional district (1983–1991)
- Anthony Beilenson, member of the U.S. House of Representatives from California (1977–1997)
- Edward Boland, member of the U.S. House of Representatives from Massachusetts's 2nd congressional district (1953–1989)
- Douglas Bosco, member of the U.S. House of Representatives from California's 1st congressional district (1983–1991)
- Rick Boucher member of the U.S. House of Representatives from Virginia's 9th congressional district (1983–2011)
- Sala Burton, member of the U.S. House of Representatives from California's 5th congressional district (1983–1987) (previously endorsed Alan Cranston)
- Barbara Boxer, member of the U.S. House of Representatives from California's 6th congressional district (1983–1993)
- Tony Coelho, member of the U.S. House of Representatives from California's 15th congressional district (1979–1989)
- Mervyn Dymally, member of the U.S. House of Representatives from California's 31st congressional district (1981–1993)
- Joseph D. Early, member of the U.S. House of Representatives from Massachusetts's 3rd congressional district (1975–1993)
- Don Edwards, member of the U.S. House of Representatives from California (1963–1995) (previously endorsed Alan Cranston)
- Barney Frank, member of the U.S. House of Representatives from Massachusetts's 4th congressional district (1981–2013)
- Robert García member of the U.S. House of Representatives from New York (1978–1990)
- Sam Gejdenson, member of the U.S. House of Representatives from Connecticut's 2nd congressional district (1981–2001)
- Tom Harkin, member of the U.S. House of Representatives from Iowa's 5th congressional district (1975–1985)
- Cecil Heftel, member of the U.S. House of Representatives from Hawaii's 1st congressional district (1977–1986)
- Marcy Kaptur, member of the U.S. House of Representatives from Ohio (1983–present)(previously endorsed John Glenn)
- Richard H. Lehman, member of the U.S. House of Representatives from California (1983–1995)
- Matthew G. Martínez, member of the U.S. House of Representatives from California (1982–2001) (previously endorsed Alan Cranston)
- Bob Matsui, member of the U.S. House of Representatives from California (1979–2005)
- George Miller, member of the U.S. House of Representatives from California (1975–2015)
- Joe Moakley, member of the U.S. House of Representatives from Massachusetts's 9th congressional district (1973–2001)
- Leon Panetta, member of the U.S. House of Representatives from California (1977–1993)
- Charles B. Rangel, member of the U.S. House of Representatives from New York (1971–2017)
- William R. Ratchford, member of the U.S. House of Representatives from Connecticut's 5th congressional district (1979–1985)
- James Michael Shannon, member of the U.S. House of Representatives from Massachusetts's 5th congressional district (1979–1985)
- Pete Stark, member of the U.S. House of Representatives from California (1973–2013)
- Esteban Torres, member of the U.S. House of Representatives from California's 34th congressional district (1983–1999) (previously endorsed Alan Cranston)

Governors

- Toney Anaya, Governor of New Mexico (1983–1987)
- Cecil Andrus, Governor of Idaho (1971–1977; 1987–1995)
- Mario Cuomo, Governor of New York (1983–1994)
- Edgar Herschler, Governor of Wyoming (1975–1987)
- Jay Rockefeller, Governor of West Virginia (1977–1985)

Statewide officials

- Robert Abrams, New York Attorney General (1979–1993)
- Madeleine Kunin, 75th Lieutenant Governor of Vermont (1979–1983)
- Tom Miller, 31st and 33rd Attorney General of Iowa (1979–1991; 1995–2023)
- Zell Miller, Lieutenant Governor of Georgia (1975–1991)

State legislative leaders

- Donald Avenson, Speaker of the Iowa House of Representatives (1983–1990)
- Lowell Junkins, Majority Leader of the Iowa Senate
- David Roberti, President pro tempore of the California State Senate (1981–1991) (previously endorsed Alan Cranston)

State legislators

- Julian Bond, member of the Georgia State Senate from the 39th district (1975–1987)

Mayors

- Richard Arrington Jr., Mayor of Birmingham, Alabama (1979–1999)
- Tom Bradley, Mayor of Los Angeles, California (1973–1993)
- Coleman Young, Mayor of Detroit, Michigan (1974–1994)

Organizations and unions

- AFL–CIO
- Alabama Democratic Conference
- National Education Association
- National Organization for Women

Party officials

- Edward Campbell, former chair of the Iowa Democratic Party
- Donald Fowler, chair of the South Carolina Democratic Party (1971–1980)
- Betty Strong, chair of the Woodbury County Democratic Party
- Edward Vrdolyak, chair of the Cook County Democratic Party (1982–1987)

Celebrities, political activists, and political commentators

- Actress Ellen Burstyn
- Actor Paul Newman
List of Gary Hart endorsements

Hart had received endorsements from:

U.S. House of Representatives

- Patricia Schroeder, member of the U.S. House of Representatives from Colorado's 1st congressional district (1973–1997)
- Chuck Schumer, member of the U.S. House of Representatives from New York (1981–1999)
- Mo Udall, member of the U.S. House of Representatives from Arizona's 2nd congressional district (1961–1991)
- Henry A. Waxman, member of the U.S. House of Representatives from California (1975–2015)

Governors

- Bob Kerrey, Governor of Nebraska (1983–1987)

Statewide officials

- Lynn Simons, 17th Wyoming Superintendent of Public Instruction (1979–1991)
- Nancy Stevenson, 83rd Lieutenant Governor of South Carolina (1979–1983)

State legislators

- Harry Chapman, member of the South Carolina Senate

Local officials

- Roger Watson, member of the Mason, Iowa city council

Party officials

- ~~David Manley, chair of the Cerro Gordo County Democratic Party~~ (switched endorsement to Alan Cranston)
- Shirley Schommer, vice-chair of the Vermont Democratic Party

Celebrities, political activists, and political commentators

- Actor and director Warren Beatty
- Actress Goldie Hawn
- Singer Don Henley
- Singer Carole King
- Actor Hal Linden
- Actress Penny Marshall
- Actor Walter Matthau
- Actor Jack Nicholson
- Actor Robert Redford
- Comedian Robin Williams
- Actress Debra Winger
List of Jesse Jackson endorsements

Jackson had received endorsements from:

U.S. House of Representatives

- Shirley Chisholm, former member of the U.S. House of Representatives from New York's 12th congressional district (1969–1983)
- Ron Dellums, member of the U.S. House of Representatives from California (1971–1998)
- Walter E. Fauntroy, delegate in the U.S. House of Representatives from Washington, D.C. (1971–1991)

Governors

- Orval E. Faubus, Former Governor of Arkansas (1955–1967)

State legislators

- Tyrone Brooks, member of the Georgia House of Representatives (1981–2015)
- Michael Figures, member of the Alabama Senate from the 33rd district (1978–1996)
- Earl Hilliard Sr., member of the Alabama Senate (1980–1993)
- Henry Sanders, member of the Alabama Senate from the 23rd district (1983–2018)

Mayors

- Marion Barry, Mayor of the District of Columbia (1979–1991; 1995–1999)
- Johnny Ford, Mayor of Tuskegee, Alabama
- Richard G. Hatcher, Mayor of Gary, Indiana (1968–1988)
- Carl Officer, Mayor of East St. Louis, Illinois

Organizations and unions

- Church of God in Christ
- Nation of Islam
- National Baptist Convention of America, Inc.
- National Baptist Convention, USA, Inc.
- National Farmers Alliance
- National Hispanic Leadership Conference

Local officials

- Frank Smith, member of the Council of the District of Columbia (1983–1999)

Celebrities, political activists, and political commentators

- Muhammad Ali
- Singer Harry Belafonte
- Ecologist Barry Commoner
- Comedian Bill Cosby
List of John Glenn endorsements (to March 16, 1984)

Glenn had received endorsements from:

U.S. Senators

- Sam Nunn, U.S. Senator from Georgia (1972–1997)
- Jim Sasser, U.S. Senator from Tennessee (1977–1995)
- Paul Tsongas, U.S. Senator from Massachusetts (1979–1985)

U.S. House of Representatives

- Jerry Huckaby, member of the U.S. House of Representatives from Louisiana's 5th congressional district (1977–1993)
- Marcy Kaptur, member of the U.S. House of Representatives from Ohio (1983–present) (endorsed Walter Mondale after Glenn withdrew from the race)

Governors

- Chuck Robb, 64th Governor of Virginia (1982–1986)

Statewide officials

- Bill Baxley, 24th Lieutenant Governor of Alabama (1983–1987)
- Tommy Irvin, Georgia Commissioner of Agriculture (1969–2011)

State legislators

- Larry Walker, member of the Georgia House of Representatives (1973–2005)

Local officials

- Tom Tully, mayor of Dubuque, Iowa (1978)

Party officials

- Lee Campbell, chair of the Union County Democratic Party
- Pat Gilroy, chair of the Johnson County Democratic Party
- Frank Rasmussen, chair of the Scott County Democratic Party
- Billy Snook, chair of the Wayne County Democratic Party
List of George McGovern endorsements (to March 14, 1984)

McGovern had received endorsements from:

U.S. Senators

- James Abourezk, former U.S. Senator from South Dakota (1973–1979)

Party officials

- Stan Kading, co-chair of the Adair County Democratic Party
- Judy Wilson, chair of the Polk County Democratic Party
List of Reubin Askew endorsements (to March 1, 1984)

Askew had received endorsements from:

U.S. Senators

- Lawton Chiles, U.S. Senator from Florida (1971–1989)

U.S. House of Representatives

- Dante Fascell, member of the U.S. House of Representatives from Florida (1955–1993)
- Bill Chappell, member of the U.S. House of Representatives from Florida's 4th congressional district (1969–1989)
- Sam Gibbons, member of the U.S. House of Representatives from Florida (1963–1997)
- Dan Mica, member of the U.S. House of Representatives from Florida (1979–1989)

Governors

- Bob Graham, 38th Governor of Florida (1979–1987)

Local officials

- Eva Mack, mayor of West Palm Beach, Florida

Party officials

- Joseph Tilley, chair of the Greene County Democratic Party
List of Ernest F. Hollings endorsements (to March 1, 1984)

Hollings had received endorsements from:

United States Senate

- Former U.S. Senator Birch Bayh of Indiana
- Former U.S. Senator William B. Spong, Jr. of Virginia

State Constitutional officers

- Lieutenant Governor Martha Griffiths of Michigan
- State Senator Anna Belle Clement O'Brien of Tennessee
- Lieutenant Governor Nancy Stevenson of South Carolina
List of Alan Cranston endorsements (to February 29, 1984)

Cranston had received endorsements from: | title = Alan Cranston endorsements (to February 29, 1984) | list =

U.S. House of Representatives

- Glenn M. Anderson, member of the U.S. House of Representatives from California (1969–1993)
- Howard Berman, member of the U.S. House of Representatives from California (1983–2013)
- George Brown Jr., member of the U.S. House of Representatives from California (1963–1971; 1973–1999)
- Sala Burton, member of the U.S. House of Representatives from California's 5th congressional district (1983–1987)
- Don Edwards, member of the U.S. House of Representatives from California (1963–1995)
- William Lehman, member of the U.S. House of Representatives from Florida (1973–1993)
- Mel Levine, member of the U.S. House of Representatives from California's 27th congressional district (1983–1993)
- Matthew G. Martínez, member of the U.S. House of Representatives from California (1982–2001)
- Esteban Torres, member of the U.S. House of Representatives from California's 34th congressional district (1983–1999)

Governors

- Jerry Brown, former Governor of California (1975–1983)

State legislative leaders

- Willie Brown, Speaker of the California State Assembly (1980–1995)
- David Roberti, President pro tempore of the California State Senate (1980–1991)

Party officials

- David Manley, chair of the Cerro Gordo County Democratic Party (previously endorsed Gary Hart)

Business executives and leaders

- Sheldon Adelson, CEO of Las Vegas Sands

Celebrities, political activists, and political commentators

- Margie Adam, singer and songwriter
- Cesar Chavez, President of United Farm Workers
List of endorsements for an Uncommitted delegation

Uncommitted delegations had received endorsements from:

Governors

- George Ariyoshi, 3rd Governor of Hawaii (1973–1986)

Mayors

- Eileen Anderson, 10th Mayor of Honolulu (1981–1985)

== Opinion polling ==
=== Polling aggregation ===
The following graph depicts the standing of each candidate in the poll aggregators from March 1983 to June 1984.

Walter Mondale Gary Hart Jesse Jackson John Glenn George McGovern Reubin Askew Fritz Hollings Alan Cranston

=== 1984 ===
Poll source	Publication	Reubin Askew	Alan Cranston	John Glenn	Gary Hart	Ernest Hollings	Jesse Jackson	George McGovern	Walter Mondale
Gallup	June 6–8, 1984	-	-	-	35%	-	6%	-	48%
Gallup	June 6–8, 1984	-	-	-	39%	-	-	-	54%
Gallup	May 18–20, 1984	-	-	-	33%	-	12%	-	46%
Gallup	May 18–20, 1984	-	-	-	36%	-	-	-	57%
Gallup	May 3–5, 1984	-	-	-	27%	-	9%	-	53%
Gallup	May 3–5, 1984	-	-	-	33%	-	-	-	59%
New York Times; CBS News	Apr. 23–26, 1984	-	-	-	32%	-	10%	-	47%
Gallup	Apr. 11–15, 1984	-	-	-	28%	-	9%	-	51%
Harris	Apr. 4–8, 1984	-	-	-	38%	-	11%	-	48%
New York Times; CBS News	Mar. 21–24, 1984	-	-	-	35%	-	9%	-	42%
Gallup	Mar. 16–18, 1984	-	-	-	39%	-	9%	-	43%
Harris	Mar. 15–17, 1984	-	-	-	45%	-	10%	-	42%
Harris	Mar. 15–17, 1984	-	-	-	51%	-	-	-	48%
New York Times; CBS News	Mar. 5–8, 1984	-	-	?	38%	-	7%	?	31%
Gallup	Mar. 2–6, 1984	-	-	5%	30%	-	9%	3%	33%
Harris	Mar. 1–3, 1984	-	-	12%	27%	-	10%	6%	37%
Gallup	Mar. 1–2, 1984	-	-	8%	35%	-	6%	1%	37%
New York Times; CBS News	Feb. 21–25, 1984	0%	1%	7%	7%	2%	8%	6%	57%
Washington Post; ABC News	Feb. 13–15, 1984	1%	3%	13%	3%	1%	9%	4%	55%
Gallup	Feb. 10–13, 1984	2%	3%	13%	3%	1%	13%	5%	49%
Harris	Feb. 9–11, 1984	1%	2%	13%	4%	1%	12%	5%	49%
Gallup	Jan. 27–30, 1984	2%	3%	15%	2%	1%	11%	7%	47%
New York Times; CBS News	Jun. 14–21, 1984	?	2%	14%	?	?	14%	4%	44%
Gallup	Jan. 13–16, 1984	1%	4%	16%	3%	1%	9%	4%	47%
Harris	Dec. 31-Jan. 2, 1984 (Note: This is an estimate based on prior polls; no hard dates were given.)	1%	6%	20%	3%	2%	12%	4%	44%

=== 1983 ===
Poll source	Publication	Reubin Askew	Alan Cranston	John Glenn	Gary Hart	Ernest Hollings	Jesse Jackson	George McGovern	Walter Mondale
Washington Post; ABC News	Dec. 9–13, 1983	1%	5%	23%	2%	0%	10%	8%	49%
Gallup	Dec. 9–12, 1983	1%	3%	24%	3%	1%	10%	8%	40%
Gallup	Nov. 18–21, 1983	3%	3%	19%	2%	1%	7%	7%	47%
Gallup	Oct. 21–24, 1983	2%	3%	23%	1%	1%	8%	7%	34%
Gallup	Oct. 7–10, 1983	1%	6%	21%	3%	1%	10%	8%	40%
Gallup	Sep. 9–12, 1983	3%	5%	23%	3%	1%	8%	8%	34%
Harris	Jul. 14-Aug. 22, 1983	2%	9%	32%	4%	2%	-	-	43%
Harris	Jul. 14-Aug. 22, 1983	2%	8%	31%	4%	2%	7%	-	40%
Gallup	Jul. 22–25, 1983	2%	7%	25%	4%	2%	–	–	41%
Los Angeles Times	Jun. 26–30, 1983	2%	7%	22%	2%	1%	4%	-	26%
Penn-Schoen	Jun. 24–28, 1983	3%	6%	30%	4%	1%	-	-	28%
New York Times; CBS News	Jun. 20–26, 1983	0%	5%	32%	1%	1%	7%	-	34%
Gallup	Jun. 10–13, 1983	3%	8%	24%	3%	1%	–	–	41%
Gallup	Apr. 29–31, 1983	1%	3%	23%	4%	1%	–	–	29%
Penn-Scheon	Apr. 23–24, 1983	0%	5%	24%	3%	1%	9%	-	36%
Harris	Apr. 7–10, 1983	1%	6%	27%	4%	1%	-	-	42%
Gallup	Mar. 11–14, 1983	2%	3%	13%	2%	1%	–	4%	32%

=== 1982 ===
Poll source	Date(s)	Jerry Brown	Jimmy Carter	John Glenn	Ted Kennedy	George McGovern	Walter Mondale	Other	Undecided/None
Gallup	Apr. 23–26, 1982	6%	11%	6%	45%	–	12%	9% (Note: Combined for Jay Rockefeller, John Y. Brown Jr., Bruce Babbitt, Daniel Patrick Moynihan, Bill Bradley, Alan Cranston, Gary Hart, Ernest Hollings, Reubin Askew, and Robert Strauss, each of whom received less than 2%.)	11%
Gallup	July 30–Aug. 2, 1982	4%	8%	7%	43%	–	13%	25% (Note: Jay Rockefeller, John Y. Brown Jr., Bruce Babbitt, Daniel Patrick Moynihan, Bill Bradley, Alan Cranston, Gary Hart, Ernest Hollings, Reubin Askew, and Robert Strauss were included in the poll but each received less than 2%.)	
Gallup	Dec. 10–13, 1982	5%	–	14%	–	6%	32%	17% (Note: Gary Hart with 2%, Alan Cranston with 2%, Reubin Askew with 1%, Ernest Hollings with 1% and less than 2% each for Bruce Babbitt, John Brown, Jay Rockefeller, Lloyd Bentsen, Daniel Patrick Moynihan, Bill Bradley, Mo Udall, Robert Strauss.)	26%

== Results by state ==
Date (daily totals)	Total pledged delegates	Contest	Delegates won and popular vote						Total	Reference
Date (daily totals)	Total pledged delegates	Contest	Walter Mondale	Gary Hart	Jesse Jackson	John Glenn	Uncommitted	Others	Total	Reference
February 20	0 (Note: First stage of caucus to select delegates to then select 3,201 county delegates on April 7.)	Iowa caucus	48.9%	16.5%	1.5%	3.5%	9.4%	20.2%		
February 28	12	New Hampshire primary	6; 28,173 (27.88%)	6; 37,702 (37.31%)	5,311 (5.26%)	12,088 (11.96%)		17,671 (17.49%)	101,045	
March 4	0 (Note: First stage of caucus to select delegates to then select 3,295 delegates on May 6)	Maine caucus	7,364 (43.73%)	8,540 (50.71%)	105 (0.62%)	52 (0.31%)	602 (3.57%)	178 (1.06%)	16,841	
March 6	0 (Note: Non-binding primary. Delegates selected at caucus on April 24.)	Vermont primary	14,985 (20.25%)	51,873 (70.08%)	5,761 (7.78%)			1,399 (1.89%)	74,018	
March 10	12	Wyoming caucus	4; 1,266 (35.84%)	8; 2,153 (60.96%)	15 (0.42%)	3 (0.08%)	101 (2.86%)	8 (0.23%)	3,532	
March 13	52	Alabama primary	23 (Note: 4 of Glenn's delegates were at-large delegates. After he withdrew these were redistributed to give Mondale an additional three and Hart one); 116,920 (27.30%)	11 (Note: 4 of Glenn's delegates were at-large delegates. After he withdrew these were redistributed to give Mondale an additional three and Hart one); 88,465 (20.66%)	9; 83,787 (19.56%)	9 (Note: 4 of Glenn's delegates were at-large delegates. After he withdrew these were redistributed to give Mondale an additional three and Hart one.); 89,286 (20.85%)	4,464 (1.04%)	45,361 (10.59%)	428,283	
March 13	123	Florida primary	57; 394,350 (35.66%)	36; 463,799 (41.94%)	0; 144,263 (13.05%)	0; 128,209 (11.59%)		30; 51,669 (4.67%) (Note: 27 delegates for Reubin Askew, 2 delegates for John Glenn, and 1 delegate for Jesse Jackson.)	1,105,750	
March 13	84	Georgia primary	24; 208,588 (30.47%)	28; 186,903 (27.30%)	17; 143,730 (21.00%)	1; 122,744 (17.93%)	3,068 (0.45%)	19,508 (2.85%)	684,541	
March 13	0 (Note: First stage of caucus to select delegates to then select delegates at state convention on May 26.)	Hawaii caucus	911 (32.3%)		118 (4.2%)		1,790 (63.5%)			
March 13	106	Massachusetts primary	41; 160,893 (25.14%)	52; 245,943 (38.43%)	31,824 (4.97%)	45,456 (7.10%)	5,080 (0.79%)	13; 196,305 (30.67%) (Note: 13 delegates for George McGovern)	640,045	
March 13	0 (Note: First stage of caucus to select delegates to then select county delegates.)	Nevada caucus	(37.7%)	(52.3%)	(0.6%)	(2%)	(7.2%)	(0.2%)	5,000	
March 13	0 (Note: First stage of caucus to select 3,247 county convention delegates.)	Oklahoma caucus	(39.7%)	(41.4%)	(3.8%)	(5.0%)	(10.1%)		42,000	
March 13	22	Rhode Island primary	10; 15,338 (34.46%)	12; 20,011 (44.96%)	3,875 (8.71%)	2,249 (5.05%)	439 (0.99%)	2,599 (5.84%)	44,511	
March 13	66	Washington caucus	31	34	1					
March 14	18	Delaware caucus	13	5				3		
March 14	12	North Dakota caucus	8	4						
March 15	0 (Note: First stage of caucus to select delegates to then select delegates at state convention on May 13.)	Alaska caucus								
March 17	42	Arkansas caucus	24	9	7			2		
March 17	5	Latin American Democrats caucus	1	9	7			4		
March 17		Kentucky urban caucus								
March 17	155	Michigan caucus	95	49	9			2		
March 17	43	Mississippi caucus	23	4	12			4		
March 17	3	Panama Canal Zone					3			
March 17	43	South Carolina caucus	15	7	16			10		
March 18	53	Puerto Rico caucus	53							
March 20	194	Illinois primary	114	42	6			32		
March 20	78	Minnesota caucus	51	3	2			22		
March 24	44	Kansas caucus	24	16				4		
March 24–26	78	Virginia caucus	31	13	22			12		
March 25	20	Montana caucus	3	13				4		
March 27	60	Connecticut primary	23	36	1			4		
March 31	0 (Note: Second stage of caucus to select delegates to then select national delegates at the district and state conventions.)	Oklahoma county convention	(41.1%)	(50.8%)	(1.3%)		(6.6%)		945	
April 3	0 (Note: Delegates selected through caucus)	Wisconsin primary	261,374 (41.11%)	282,435 (44.42%)	62,524 (9.83%)	6,398 (1.01%)		23,037 (3.62%)	635,768	
April 3	285	New York primary	155	77	51			2		
April 7	69	Louisiana caucus	16	21	24			8		
April 7	0 (Note: First stage of caucus to select 1,799 delegates to then select 53 delegates on May 5.)	Wisconsin caucus	1,419	952	86	0	0	0		
April 7	0 (Note: Second stage of caucus to select delegates to then select 34 delegates on May 5)	Iowa county conventions	1,654	949	36	0	314	248		
April 10	117 (Note: Additional 55 delegates based on primary performance allocated on June 2.)	Pennsylvania primary	81	14	16	1	4	1 (Note: Alan Cranston)		
April 14	40	Arizona caucus	19	19	1			1		
April 14	53	Kentucky district conventions	19	3	6		25			
April 14	29	Oklahoma district conventions	13	16						
April 15	8	New Hampshire convention	3	3			2			
April 16	24	Utah caucus	4	14				6		
April 17	83	Missouri caucus	53	9	15			6		
April 24	0 (Note: First stage of caucus to select delegates to then select national delegates at state convention on May 26.)	Vermont caucus	431	691	215		87			
April 24	7	Guam caucus	6.25	0.75						
April ?	0 (Note: Second stage of caucus to select county delegates to then select national delegates on May 6.)	Nevada county convention								
May 1	16	Washington D.C. primary	4		12					
May 1	76	Tennessee primary	35	21	15			5		
May 5	34	Iowa district conventions	20	13	0	0	0	1		
May 5	186	Texas caucus	100	38	30			18		
May 5	53	Wisconsin congressional district caucus	31	17	5	0	0	0		
May 6	27	Maine convention	12	13			2			
May 6	18	Oklahoma state convention	6	12						
May 6	17	Nevada convention	6	11						
May 7	48	Colorado caucus		45				3		
May 8	80	Indiana primary	31; 293,413 (40.93%)	38; 299,491 (41.77%)	7; 98,190 (13.70%)	16,046 (2.24%)		4; 9,815 (1.37%)		
May 8	70	Maryland primary	47	3	17			3		
May 8	80	North Carolina primary	47	18	14			1		
May 8	176	Ohio primary	80	80	10			6		
May 13	11	Alaska convention	6	4	1					
May 15	24	Nebraska primary	8	16						
May 15	47	Oregon primary	18	29						
May 19	6	American Samoa caucus	6							
May 22	20	Idaho primary	6	11				3		
May 26	19	Hawaii convention	6				13			
May 26	17	Vermont convention	5	8	3		1			
May 26	18	Wisconsin at-large delegates	5	2	0	0	11	0		
June 2	55	Pennsylvania convention	55	0	0	0	0	0		
June 5	333	California primary	91; 1,049,342 (35.32%)	207; 1,155,399 (38.89%)	30; 546,693 (18.40%)	96,770 (3.26%)		122,573 (4.12%)	5	
June 5	73	New Jersey primary	68; 305,516 (45.16%)	1; 200,948 (29.70%)	4; 159,788 (23.62%)			10,309 (1.52%)	676,561	
June 5	27	New Mexico primary	13	14						
June 5	15	South Dakota primary	6; 20,495 (38.99%)	9; 26,641 (50.69%)	2,738 (5.21%)		1,304 (2.48%)	1,383 (2.63%)	52,561	
June 5	35	West Virginia primary	22; 198,776 (51.91%)	13; 137,866 (38.09%)	24,697 (6.82%)			632 (0.17%)	361,971	
June 9	24	Iowa conventions	15	7	0	0	0	1		
June 16	34	New Jersey convention	34	0	0	0	0	0		
Total										

When he made his acceptance speech at the Democratic Convention, Mondale said: "Let's tell the truth. Mr. Reagan will raise taxes, and so will I. He won't tell you. I just did." Although Mondale intended to expose Reagan as hypocritical and position himself as the honest candidate, the choice of taxes as a discussion point likely damaged his electoral chances.

=== Vice-Presidential nominee ===
Mondale chose U.S. Rep. Geraldine A. Ferraro of New York as his running mate and she was confirmed by acclamation, making her the first woman nominated for that position by a major party.

Aides later said that Mondale was determined to establish a precedent with his vice presidential candidate, considering San Francisco Mayor (Later U.S. Senator) Dianne Feinstein and Governor of Kentucky Martha Layne Collins, who were also female; Los Angeles Mayor Tom Bradley, an African American; and San Antonio Mayor Henry Cisneros, a Hispanic, as other finalists for the nomination. Unsuccessful nomination candidate Jackson derided Mondale's vice-presidential screening process as a "P.R. parade of personalities"; however, he praised Mondale for his choice.

Others however preferred Senator Lloyd Bentsen because he would appeal to more conservative Southern voters. Nomination rival Gary Hart had also been lobbying for the vice-presidential spot on the ticket once it became apparent that Mondale had clinched the majority of delegates; Hart's supporters claimed he would do better than Mondale against President Reagan, an argument undercut by a June 1984 Gallup poll that showed both men nine points behind the President.

Politicians considered for vice presidential nomination:

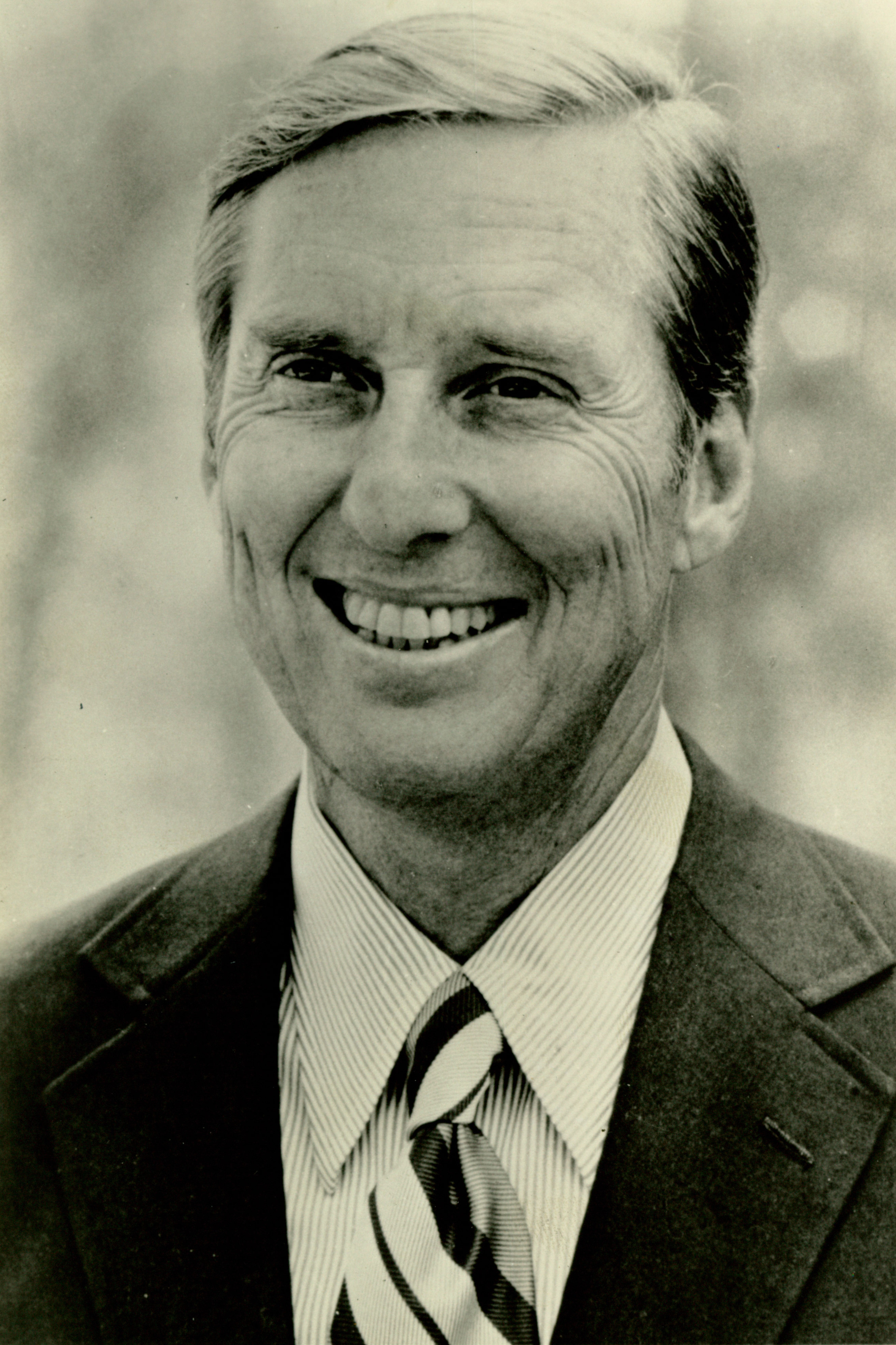
Senator Lloyd Bentsen of Texas

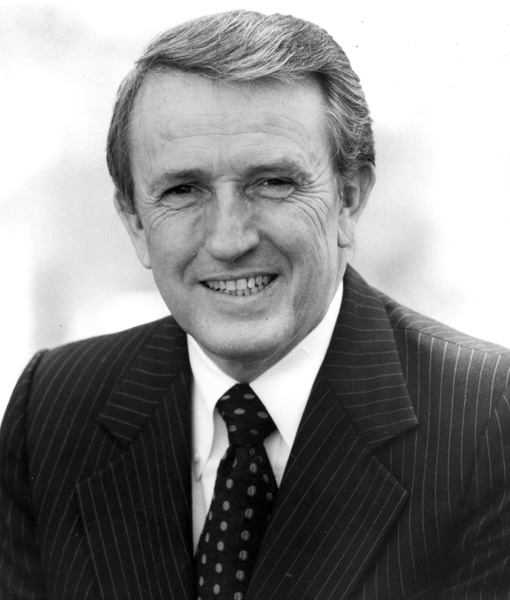
Senator Dale Bumpers of Arkansas

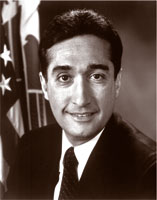
Mayor Henry Cisneros of San Antonio, Texas

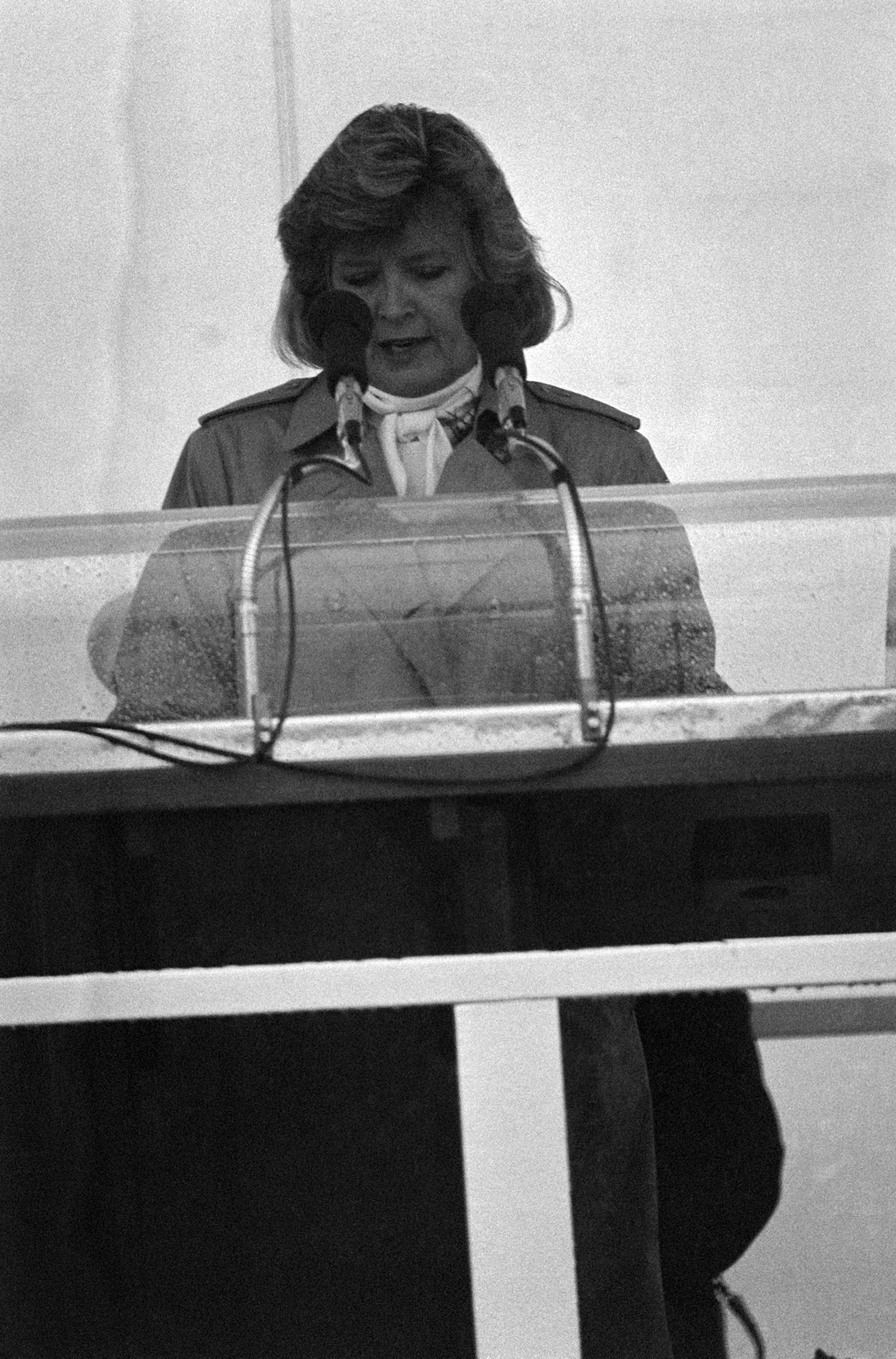
Governor Martha Layne Collins of Kentucky

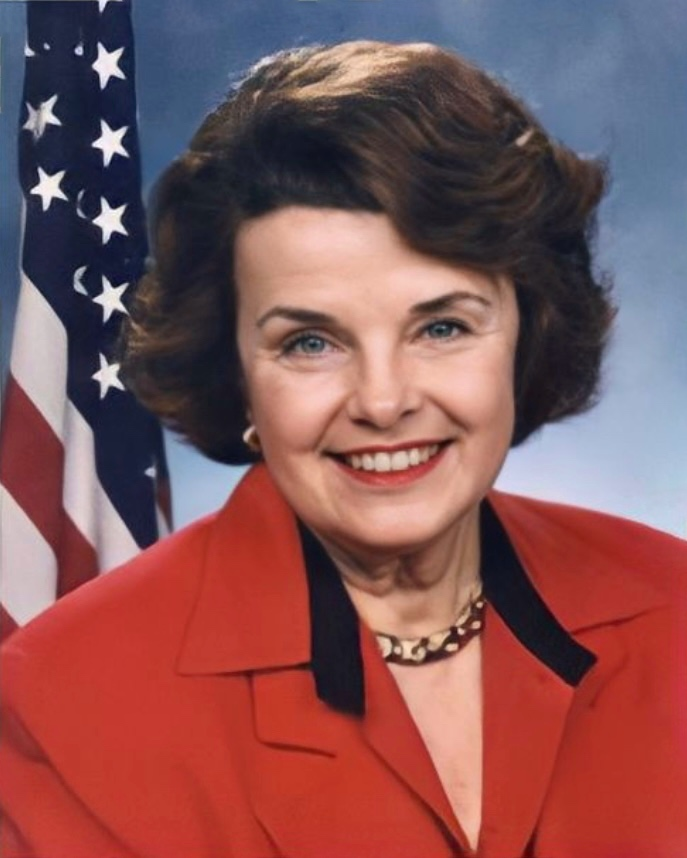
Mayor Dianne Feinstein of San Francisco, California

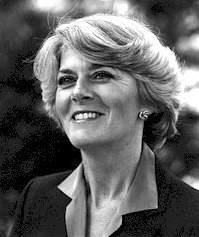
Representative Geraldine Ferraro of New York

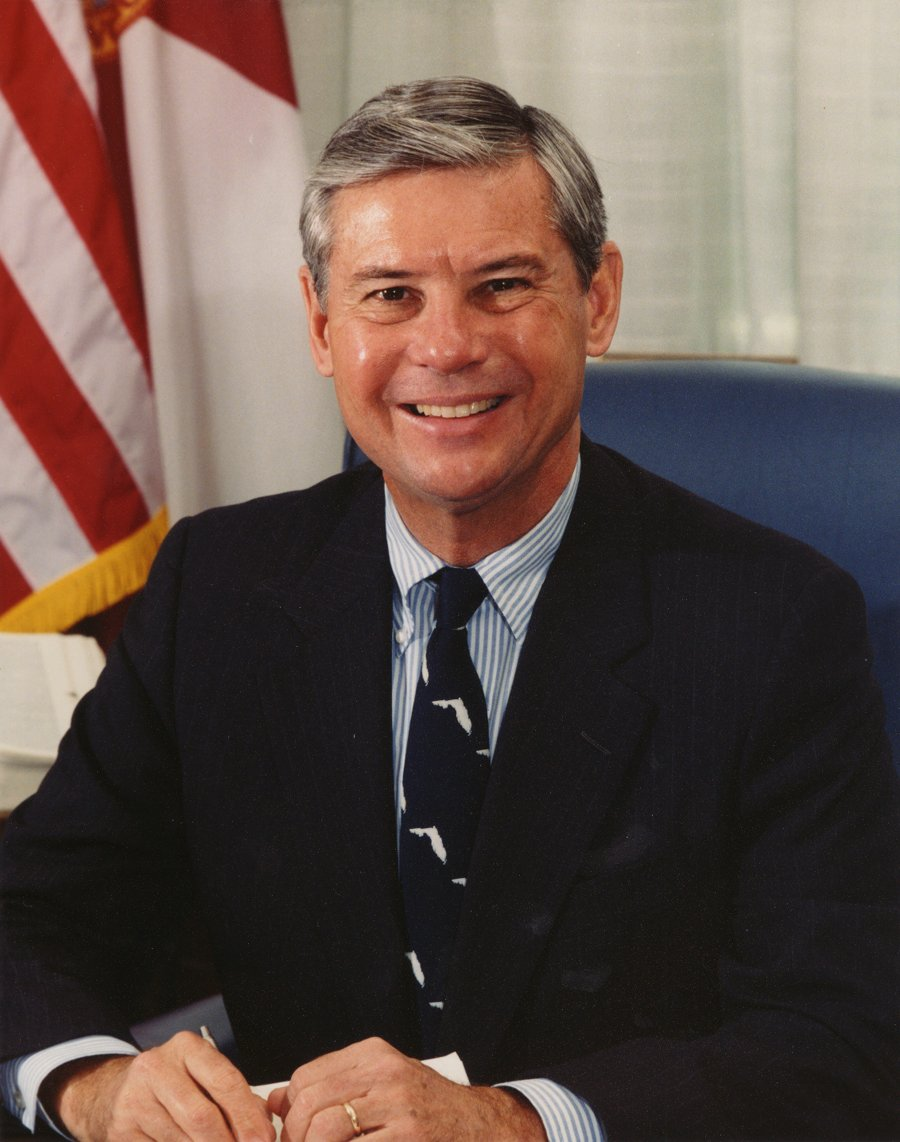
Governor Bob Graham of Florida

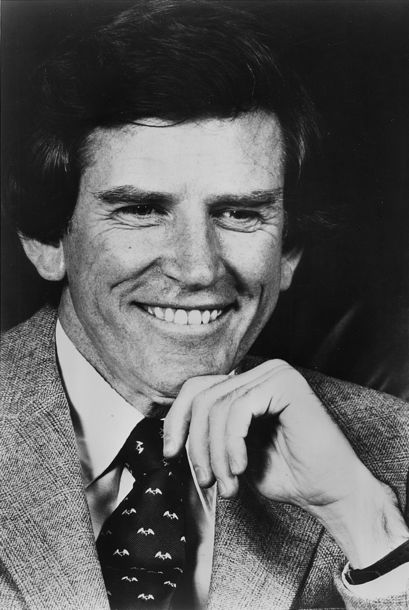
Senator Gary Hart of Colorado

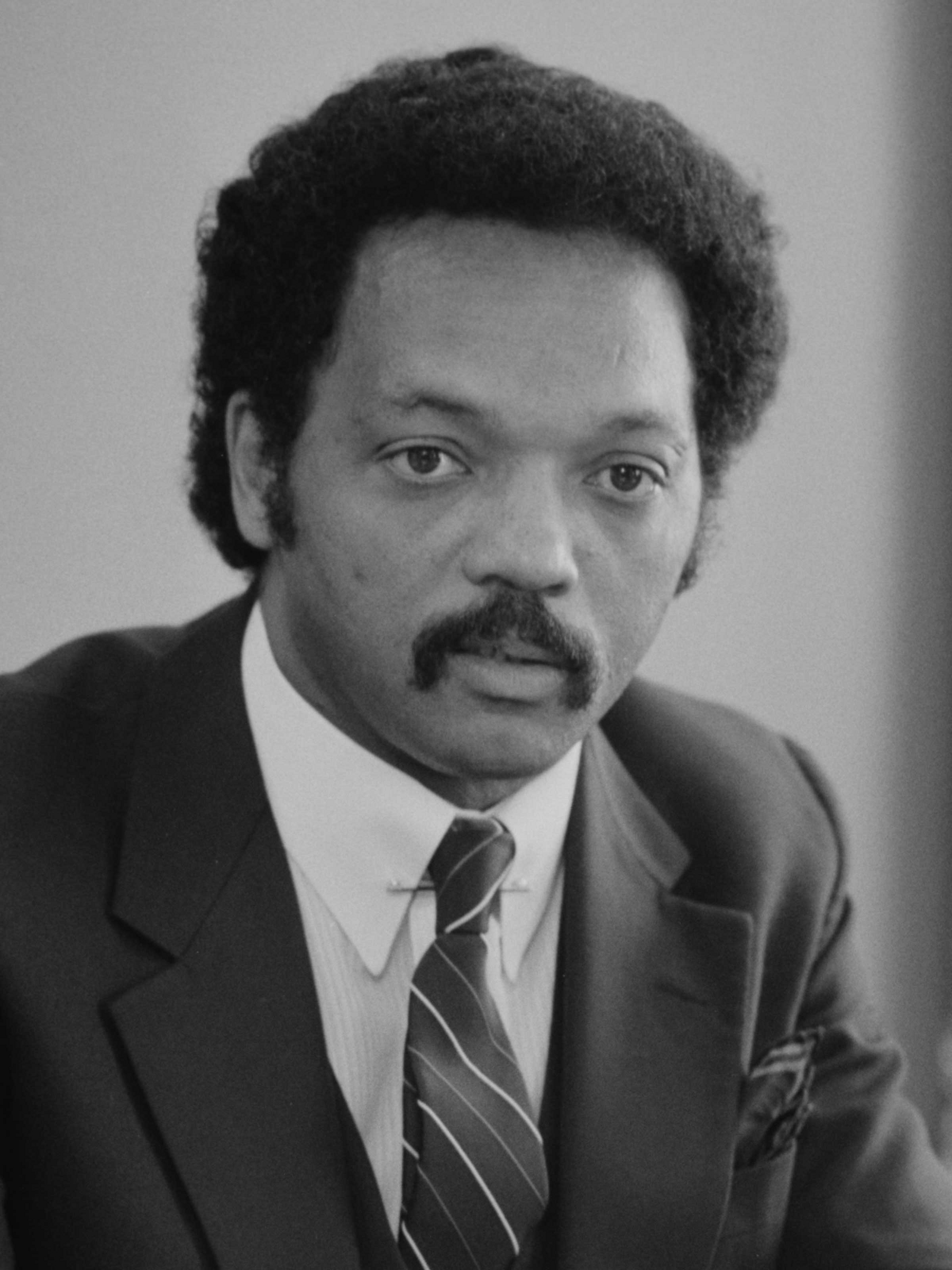
Reverend Jesse Jackson of Illinois

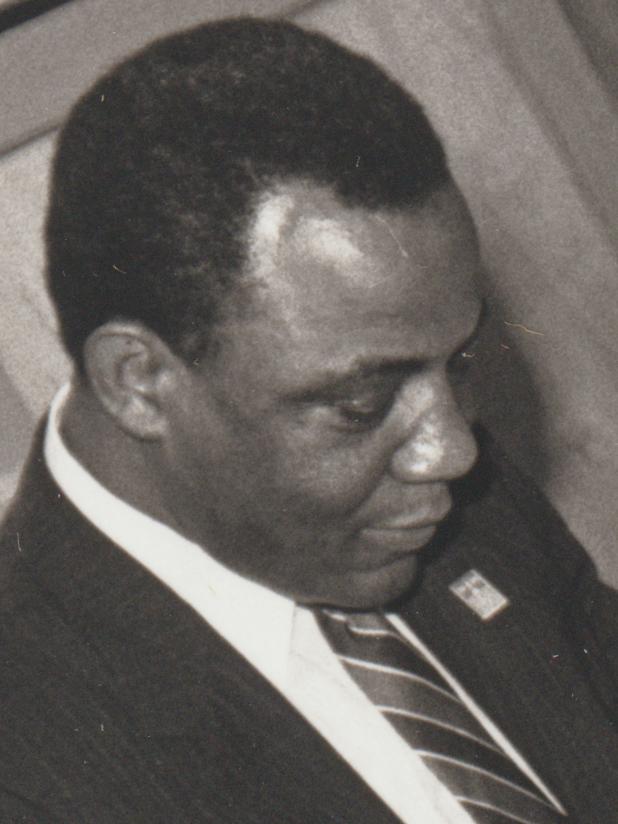
Mayor Wilson Goode of Philadelphia, Pennsylvania

== See also ==
- Republican Party presidential primaries, 1984

== Works cited ==
- Choice For President Democratic and Republican Candidates (PDF). Secretary of State of New Jersey. 1984.
- The Iowa Official Register: 1991-1992 (PDF). Secretary of State of Iowa. 1993.
- Official Count of the Ballots Cast for Presidential Electors, Representatives In Congress, General Officers, Senators and Representatives in the General Assembly (PDF). Secretary of State of Rhode Island. 1984.
- Official Election Returns and Registration Figures for South Dakota (PDF). Secretary of State of South Dakota. 1984.
- Primary and General Elections. Secretary of State of Vermont. 1984.
- The state of Wisconsin Blue Book 1985-1986. Wisconsin. 1986.
- Votes For Presidential Primaries - Democratic Party. Secretary of the Commonwealth of Massachusetts. 1984.
- Cleland, Max (1984). Consolidated Vote State Democratic and Republican Presidential Primary (PDF). Georgia Secretary of State.
- Morgan, Christopher (1985). State of New Hampshire Manual for the General Court. New Hampshire Secretary of State.
- Nelson, Michael, ed. (1985). The Elections of 1984. Congressional Quarterly. ISBN 0871873427.
- Pomper, Marlene, ed. (1985). The Election of 1984. Chatham House. ISBN 093454042X.
- Ranney, Austin, ed. (1985). The American Elections of 1984. Duke University Press. ISBN 0822302306.
- Rosenstone, Steven (1985). "Explaining the 1984 Presidential Election". The Brookings Review. 3 (2). Brookings Institution: 25–32. JSTOR 20079866.
- Willis, Todd, ed. (1984). West Virginia Blue Book (PDF). Secretary of State of West Virginia.
- Wormser, Michael, ed. (1984). Elections '84. Congressional Quarterly. ISBN 0871873109.
