= 1984 New Jersey Democratic presidential primary =

1984 New Jersey Democratic presidential primaries
- June 5, 1984
- Presidential delegate primary

107 Democratic National Convention delegates
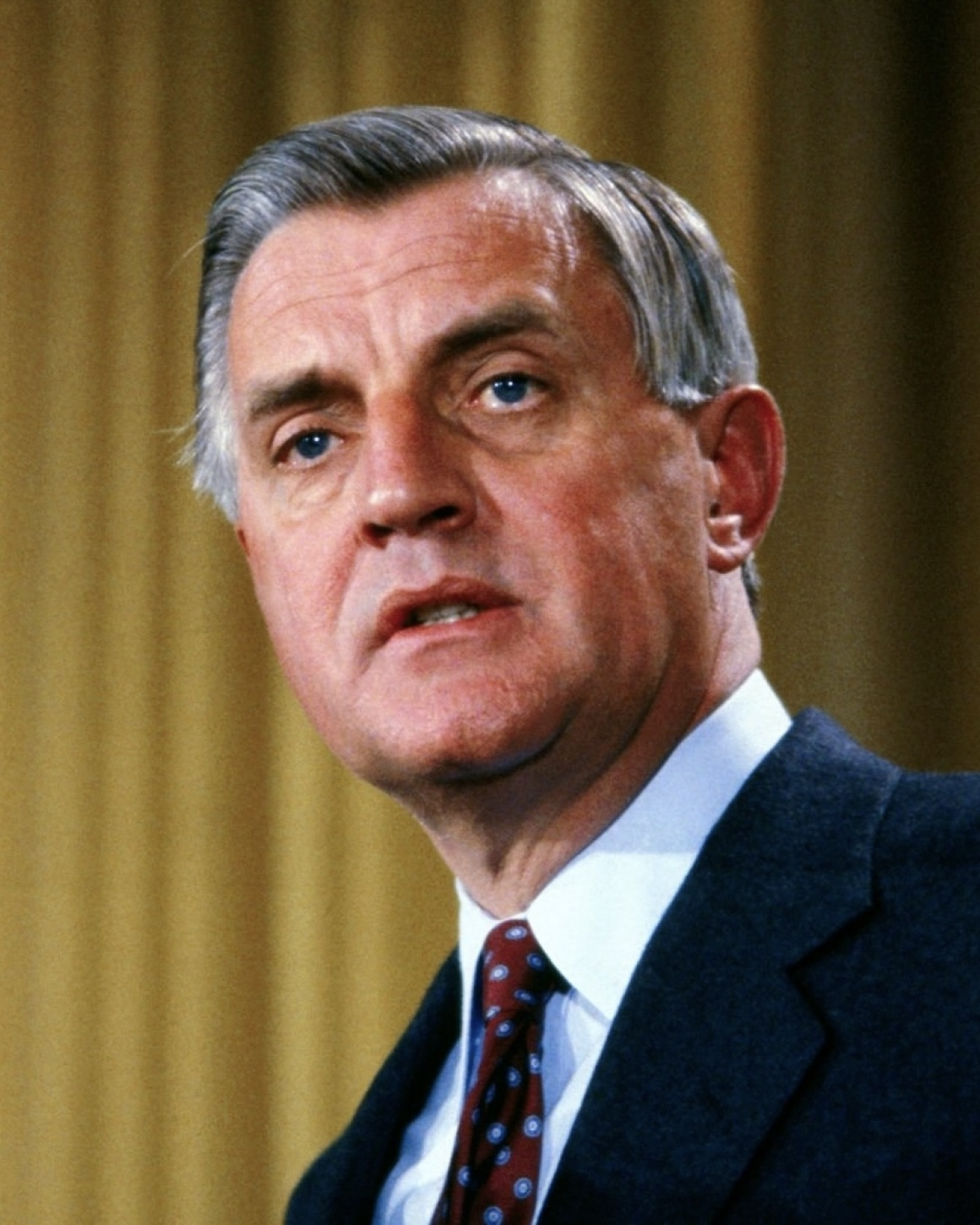

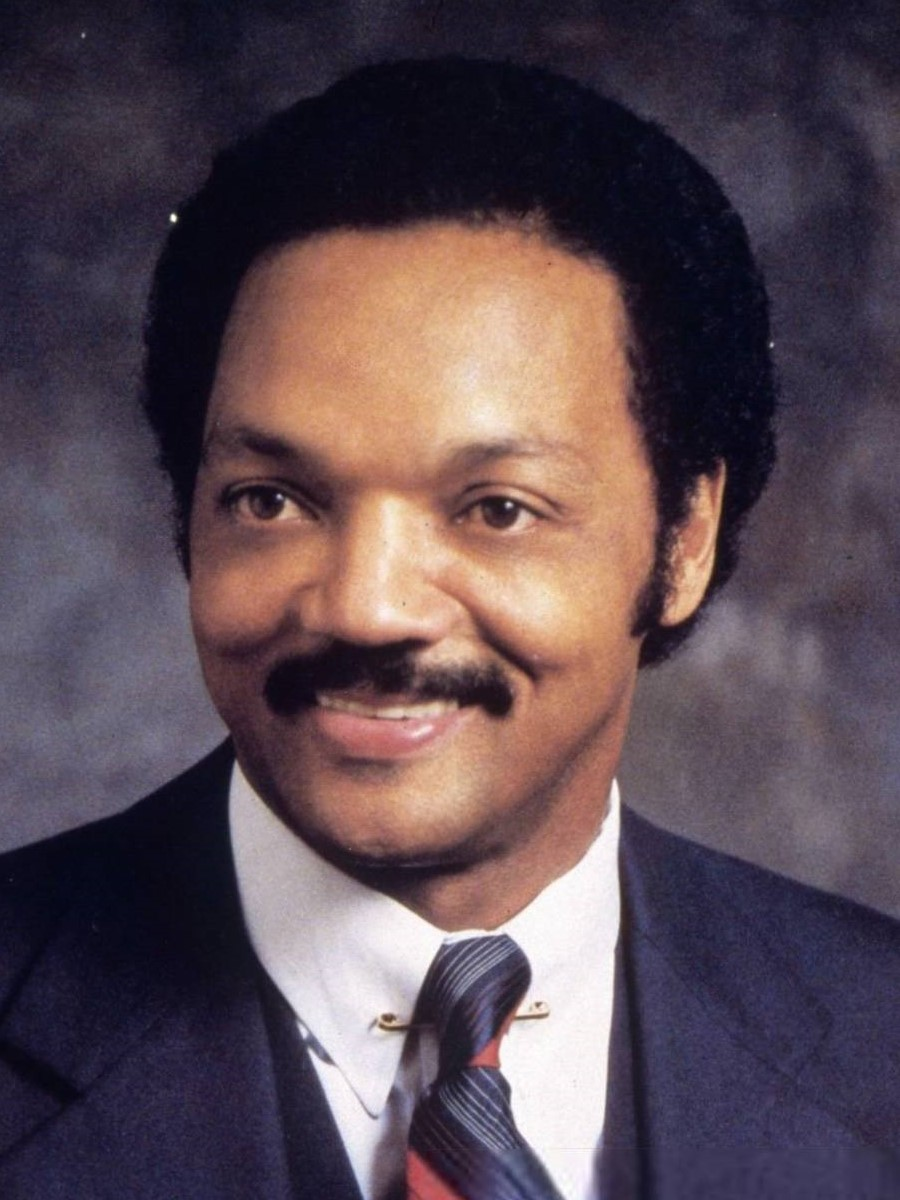

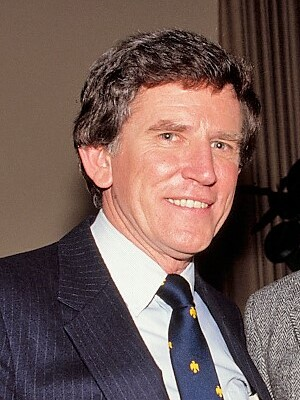
Candidate	Walter Mondale	Jesse Jackson	Gary Hart
Home state	Minnesota	Illinois	Colorado
Delegate count	102	4	1
- Presidential preference primary (non-binding)

No Democratic National Convention delegates
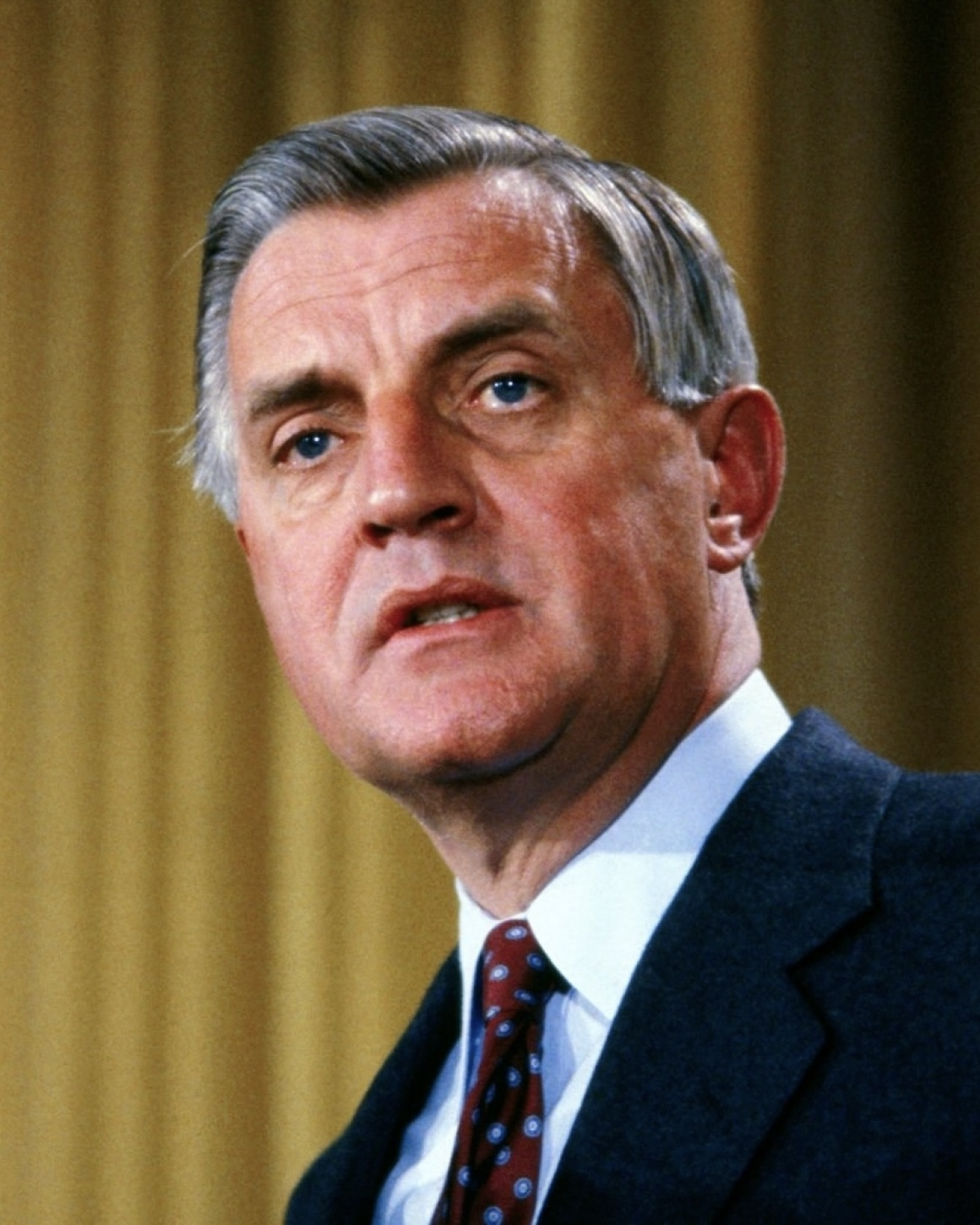

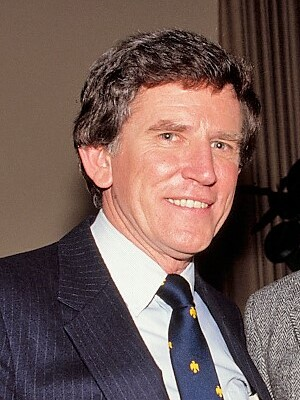

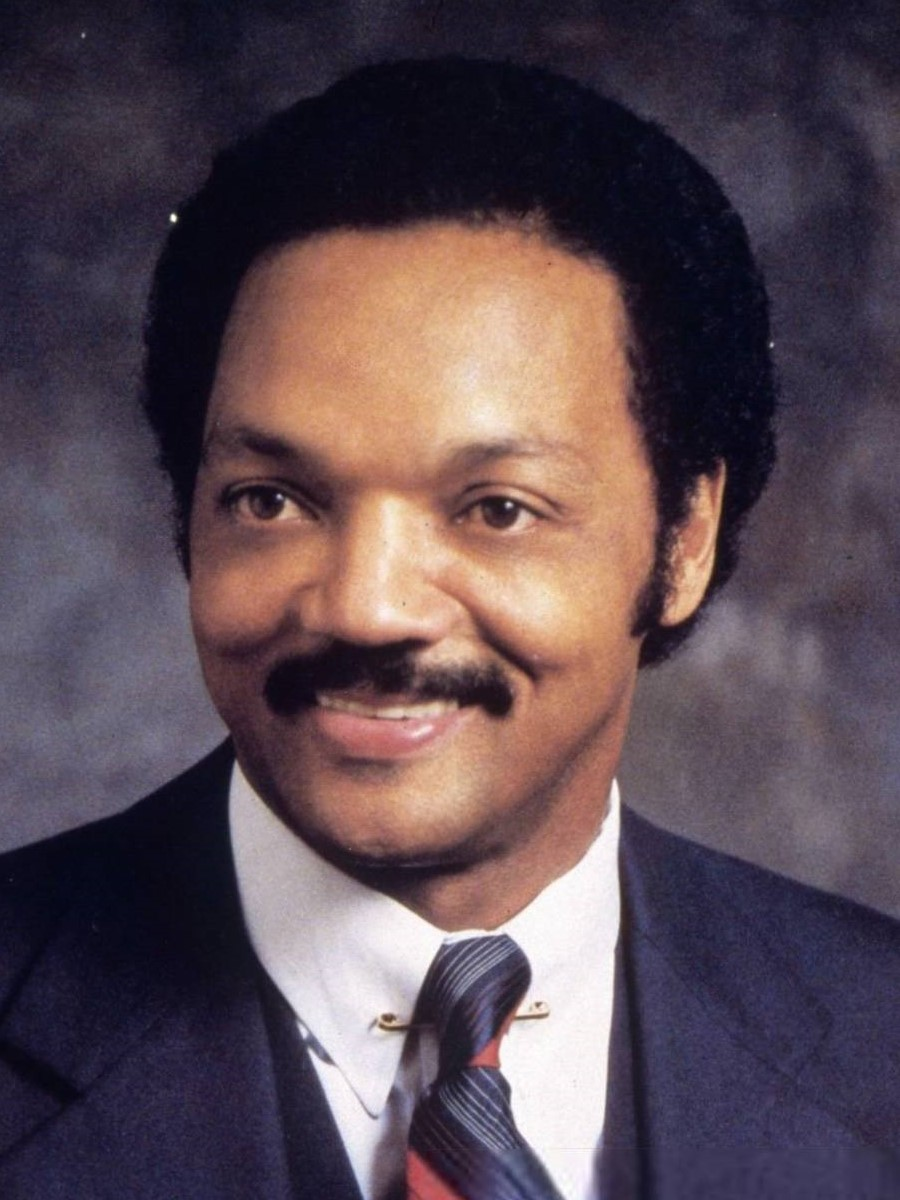
Candidate	Walter Mondale	Gary Hart	Jesse Jackson
Home state	Minnesota	Colorado	Illinois
Popular vote	305,516	200,948	159,788
Percentage	45.2%	29.7%	23.6%

The 1984 New Jersey Democratic presidential primary was held on June 5, 1984, in New Jersey as one of the Democratic Party's statewide nomination contests ahead of the 1984 United States presidential election. Former vice president Walter Mondale won an overwhelming victory over U.S. senator Gary Hart and civil rights activist Jesse Jackson, winning 45 percent of the vote but sweeping nearly all of the state's 107 pledged delegates. Mondale's victory, which came following a major political gaffe by Hart in the closing weeks of the campaign, put him on the precipice of the nomination and, following an endorsement by Frank Lautenberg, resulted in his status as the presumptive nominee. He was ultimately carried over the top at the 1984 Democratic National Convention by the support of superdelegates.

Over 670,000 voters participated in the primary, breaking the record set four years earlier.

== Background ==
Entering the 1984 New Jersey primary, Walter Mondale had begun to steadily pull away from Gary Hart in the national delegate count. However, he still had not won sufficient pledged delegates to secure the nomination on the first ballot.

In a notable contrast to prior primary campaigns, none of the delegates were formally bound to support a candidate on the first ballot. As a result, Hart believed that a strong showing in the final day of primaries, particularly in California and New Jersey, would demonstrate that Mondale lacked popular support and could convince many delegates who had been elected as Mondale supporters to flip to him at the convention. By contrast, Mondale's advisors believed that winning both states would force Hart to withdraw from the race.

=== Procedure ===
In 1984, New Jersey was allocated 122 total delegates to the Democratic National Convention. These were divided as follows:

- 73 were elected directly by the voters at the district level;
- 24 were elected indirectly by the district delegates;
- 10 were elected by the Democratic state committee; and
- 15 were "superdelegates," accredited ex officio to prominent officeholders among those not already elected in one of the other categories.

Delegate districts followed the boundaries of the state's legislative districts, with some legislative districts combined into a single delegate district.

The 34 delegates in the second and third categories were to be assigned proportionally among the candidates who received at least 20 percent of the delegates.

Along with the delegate elections, a non-binding preference poll or "beauty contest" was held.

== Candidates ==
- Gary Hart, U.S. senator from Colorado
- Jesse Jackson, Baptist minister and activist
- Walter Mondale, former Vice President of the United States

== Endorsements ==
Gary Hart

Party officials

- James F. Maloney, chair of the New Jersey Democratic Party (superdelegate)
Walter Mondale

U.S. representatives

- James J. Howard, U.S. representative from New Jersey's 3rd congressional district (superdelegate)
- Bernard J. Dwyer, U.S. representative from New Jersey's 6th congressional district (superdelegate)
- Robert A. Roe, U.S. representative from New Jersey's 8th congressional district (superdelegate)
- Frank J. Guarini, U.S. representative from New Jersey's 14th congressional district (superdelegate)
Declined to endorse

U.S. senators

- Frank Lautenberg, U.S. senator since 1983

== Campaign ==
Late in the race, Hart predicted that he could deny Mondale the nomination by sweeping all five states (New Jersey, California, New Mexico, North Dakota, and West Virginia) on June 5, the final day of popular voting. With 486 pledged delegates available, California and New Jersey in particular became points of focus for Hart and Mondale. The Mondale campaign predicted their candidate was likely to have secured 1,750 of the 1,967 delegates necessary for his nomination before the June 5 primaries.

Jackson was less of a factor in New Jersey than he had been in previous primaries, despite its relatively large black population. By June, he had largely abandoned his hopes of being nominated, even as vice president, and instead focused on criticizing the front-runners, the press, and President Ronald Reagan, particularly on foreign policy. Hart avoided directly coordinating with Jackson to stop Mondale and sought to assure Jewish voters that he would not pick Jackson as his running mate if nominated, unless Jackson abandoned his support for the Arab cause against Israel.

On May 25, Hart committed a serious political gaffe on a fundraising stop in Bel Air, Los Angeles with his wife. Hart remarked, "The deal is that we campaign separately. That's the bad news. The good news for her is that she campaigns in California while I campaign in New Jersey." Compounding the problem, when his wife interjected, "I got to hold a koala bear," Hart replied, "I won't tell you what I got to hold—samples from a toxic-waste dump." The Bel Air comments, which were widely published, alienated many New Jerseyans and undercut Hart's argument that New Jersey epitomized his vision for the country, of a state successfully transitioning from heavy industry to high tech growth.

Hart struggled to recover from the comments, initially claiming that he had merely meant that he wished he did not have to fly cross-country twice. He made a point of publicly praising New Jersey in his next public appearance with former California governor Jerry Brown, and after filming a television commercial on a San Francisco area beach, he remarked, "I think New Jersey has wonderful beaches, very close to California's." At a press conference at Newark Academy on May 27, Mondale initially said that he would not "press the point" on Hart's remark but then proceeded to read the remark from a printed sheet of paper and call on Hart to "make it clear that he did not intend any adverse implications there [and] make it clear that he's sorry for any adverse implications." Mocking Hart, he added to television cameras, "The good news is that Gary Hart is coming back to New Jersey. The bad news for Gary Hart is that the people of New Jersey are going to vote on June 5." Hart declined Mondale's call for an apology, stating, "The people of New Jersey know very well that I deeply admire the progress that state has made. I've said so throughout that state."

On Memorial Day, Mondale conducted a disastrous campaign swing through the state, visiting Fort Lee, where he was heckled by supporters of Lyndon LaRouche; the Jersey Shore, where storms kept crowds home; and Cherry Hill, where a waitress mistook him for Hart. Hart spent Memorial Day in Atlantic City in a stated effort to evoke the image of the late John F. Kennedy. (Similarly, he filmed a California campaign commercial on a San Francisco area beach.)

Hart continued to stumble in the final days of the campaign, saying that he would consider Jesse Jackson as a running mate, and then ruling out the possibility on the grounds that Jackson was insufficiently supportive of Israel. Jackson accused Hart of "pandering" to black and Jewish voters, and Hart told reporters that Jackson "knew better".

On the eve of the primary, The New York Times estimated that Mondale need slightly more than 200 delegates in the June 5 contests to secure the nomination. Mondale finished his campaign in Saint Paul, Minnesota, where he delivered what he termed "the last speech in the campaign." Hart remained in Jersey, where he made his final campaign appearances in the suburbs, including a stop in Haddonfield.

== Results ==
1984 New Jersey Democratic presidential primary
Party	Candidate	Votes	%
Democratic	Walter Mondale	305,516	45.16%
Democratic	Gary Hart	200,948	29.70%
Democratic	Jesse Jackson	159,788	23.62%
Democratic	Lyndon LaRouche	10,309	1.52%
Total votes		676,561	100.00%

While Mondale won expected to support in industrial centers, his late surge delivered him a victory across the state, including in the suburban districts which were expected to be Hart strongholds. The delegate allocation rules gave Mondale 92 percent of the delegates despite winning only 45 percent of the vote.

Jackson won four delegates, all from a single district made up of the 28th and 29th legislative districts in Newark and Irvington. Jackson also carried Essex County by a wide margin. The only winning Hart delegate, Barbara Drake of Roxbury, won by only five votes over Mondale candidate Kanak Dutta of Bridgewater in initial polling. Drake trailed two more Mondale delegates, Raylene Frankenfield and Robert Raymar, by hundreds of votes each.

Because Hart and Jackson did not win at least 20 percent of the district delegates, Mondale was awarded all 34 at-large delegates, bringing his total in the state to 102 out of 107.

Of the seven superdelegates known following the primary, five had endorsed Mondale.

=== Exit polling ===
An exit poll conducted by The New York Times and CBS News indicated that Mondale had received two-thirds of voters from union households and two-thirds of the elderly, each of which accounted more than one-third of the overall vote.

== Aftermath ==
As a result of the New Jersey primary and a resounding victory in West Virginia, Mondale claimed he had won the nomination. Speaking to supporters in Saint Paul, he said, "Three months ago, I said that this would be a marathon. Now as you know, marathons are long and hard. Every one of them has a finish line and a winner. Well, this is it, and here I am."

Despite the loss in New Jersey, Hart remained in the race. While California results were still being tabulated, his campaign stated that victories in the West would overshadow the New Jersey result and reiterated his belief that uncommitted delegates would rally to Hart. Some aides indicated that if Hart lost California as well, they would urge him to withdraw. Jackson also said that he would challenge the delegate selection rules at the convention arguing that "party justice" should precede "party unity."

Mondale ultimately formally clinched the nomination two days after the primary by convincing New Jersey senator Frank Lautenberg, who had previously been unpledged, to support him. Lautenberg said, "Now is the time for our party to pull together behind a nominee. I believe it is time for Gary Hart to come home to the Democratic Party and behind the nomination of Walter Mondale."
