= 1984 Iowa Democratic presidential caucuses =

- February 20, 1984

58 Democratic National Convention delegates
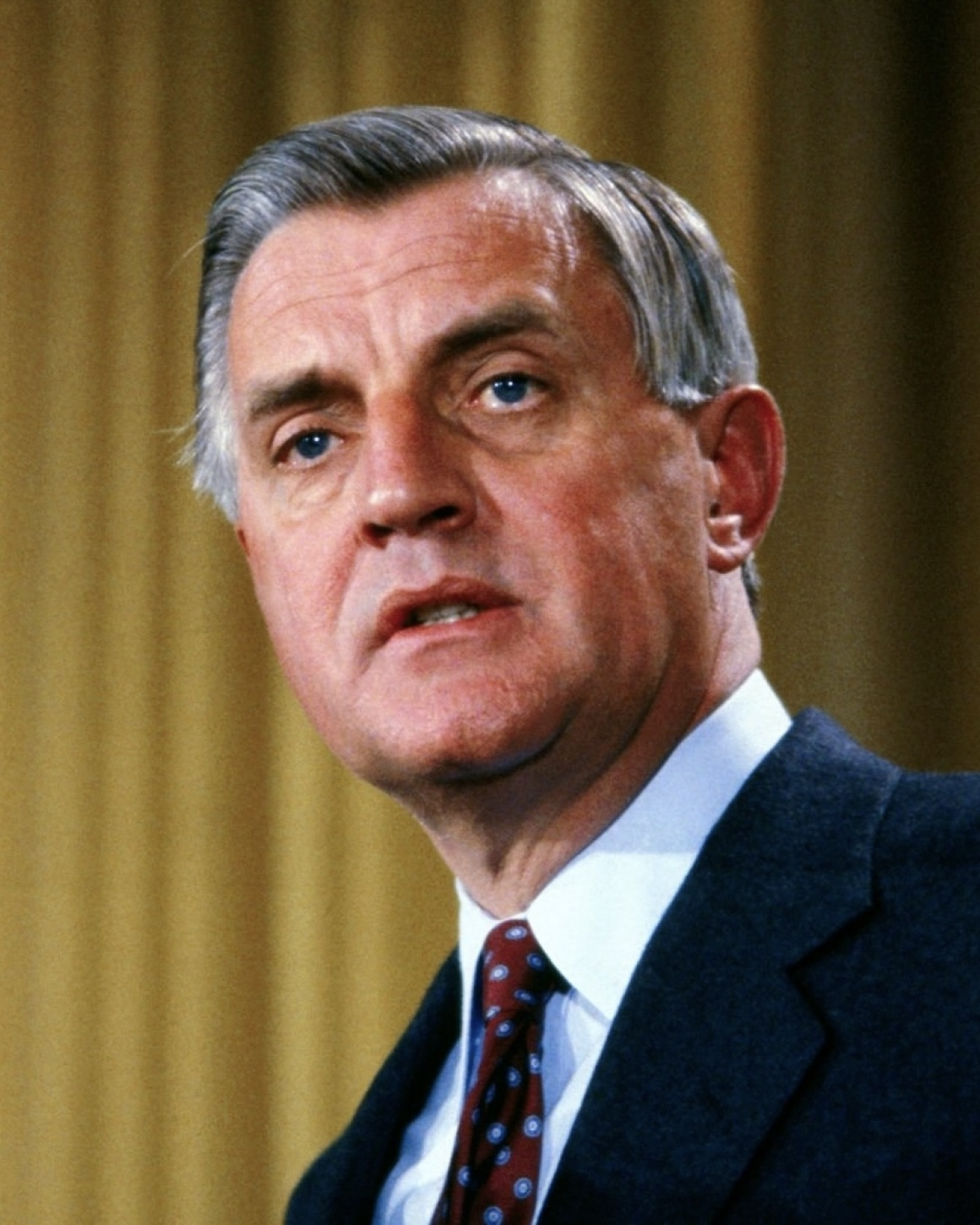

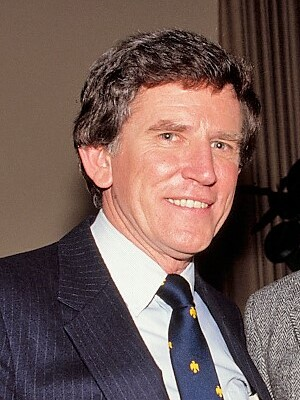

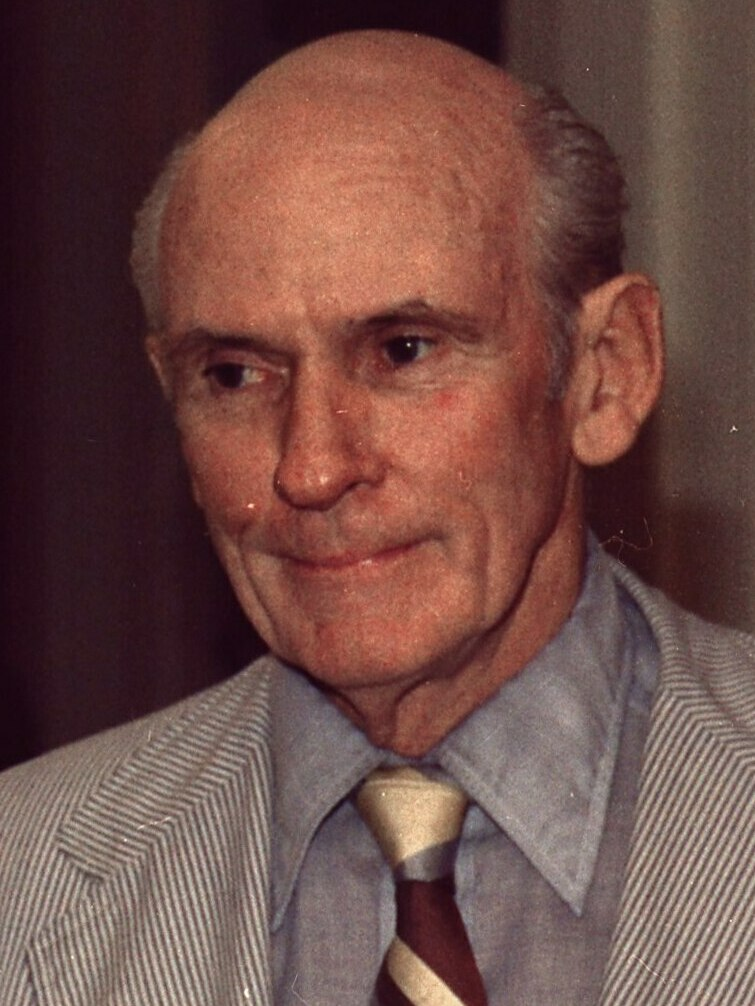
Candidate	Walter Mondale	Gary Hart	George McGovern
Home state	Minnesota	Colorado	South Dakota
Delegate count	35	20	2
SDEs	1,444.8	486.3	303.1
Percentage of SDEs	48.9%	16.5%	10.3%
Candidate	Uncommitted	Alan Cranston
Home state	–	California
Delegate count	1	0
SDEs	277.4	219.5
Percentage of SDEs	9.4%	7.4%

Walter Mondale Gary Hart	George McGovern Tie

Caucuses in Iowa for the Democratic presidential nomination were held on February 20, marking the Democratic Party's first nominating contest in their series of presidential primaries ahead of the 1984 presidential election.

Walter Mondale won a plurality of the precinct caucus and received a majority of the state's delegates. John Glenn, who hoped to place second, performed poorly in sixth place while Gary Hart placed second.

== Procedure ==
Precinct caucuses were held on February 20, 1984, to select delegates who would attend county conventions on April 7. The county conventions would select delegates for district conventions on May 5, where 34 delegates would be selected from the state's six congressional districts. 24 delegates were selected at the state convention. 8 of the 58 delegates were uncommitted superdelegates. Candidates had to receive 15% of the vote at the precinct level to qualify for delegates.

The Democratic National Committee prohibited Iowa from holding its caucuses prior to February 27, 1984. However, on November 19, 1983, the Iowa Democratic State Committee voted 20 to 10 to move the caucuses to February 20, violating the order to be eight days before the New Hampshire primary, which was also in violation of the schedule.

Former state chair Edward Campbell, Jean Haugland, and Charles Gifford filed a lawsuit to delay the caucuses. They argued that the early date violated the national rules and would unconstitutionally risk their delegation. However, U.S. District Judge Donald E. O'Brien ruled on January 17, 1984, that he chose between the "two significant negative impacts" of delaying the caucuses or risking the seating of Iowa's delegation. The DNC chose to not penalize Iowa, which would have reduced its delegation size.

== Campaign ==
Bill Romjue, who managed Jimmy Carter's campaign for the 1980 caucuses, managed Hart's campaign in Iowa, but later quit. Hart's campaign was bolstered by his second place showing.

Maria Menne managed Reubin Askew's campaign. Askew set a goal of placing fourth. He attempted to appeal to anti-abortion and conservative voters to bolster his support. Iowan anti-abortion activists Carolyn Thompson and CeCe Zenti worked on his campaign.

John Law managed Alan Cranston's campaign. Cranston, a supporter of the Nuclear Freeze campaign, hoped to capitalize on The Day After and scheduled his paid media in Iowa to air during it. Cranston set a goal of placing third in order "to emerge as an alternative to Mondale and Glenn".

Joe Trippi managed Mondale's campaign. Judy Wilson, the chair of the Polk County Democratic Party, managed McGovern's campaign. McGovern spent $50,000 in Iowa. Fritz Hollings and Jesse Jackson did not campaign in Iowa.

=== Debates and forums ===
Four candidates attended a debate hosted by the Brown and Black Coalition in Des Moines on January 10. Eight candidates participated in a debate hosted by The Des Moines Register in Des Moines on February 11. 593,000 people watched the debate and polling showed Mondale and McGovern performed the best.

Six candidates attended a forum hosted by the Iowa Farm Unity Coalition and Rural America at Iowa State University in Ames on January 21. Cranston, Hart, and McGovern participated in a forum hosted by the Dubuque County Democratic Party on January 29.

=== Reactions and aftermath ===
Jerry Vento managed John Glenn's campaign in Iowa before replacing William White as Glenn's national campaign manager. Vento predicted that Glenn would place second with 15-20% of the vote. Glenn stated that "We got whipped" after his poor showing in the caucus.

David R. Nagle, chair of the Iowa Democratic Party, criticized television networks for declaring Mondale the winner before the results were reported at 8:30 PM. Mondale was projected as the winner by CBS News at 8:12 PM and NBC at 8:18 PM. Nagle, Charles Manatt, and Tim Wirth claimed that the early projections influenced the results.

Hart's campaign was bolstered by his second placing show. Hart, despite not winning Iowa, was now viewed as the only viable opponent to Mondale. Polling in New Hampshire initially showed Mondale defeating Hart, but Hart won the primary. Hart was polling below 10% nationally in late February, but was polling above 30% by March 2, and near 40% by March 6.

== Polling ==
Poll source	Date(s) administered	Sample size	Margin of error	Reubin Askew	Alan Cranston	John Glenn	Gary Hart	Fritz Hollings	Jesse Jackson	George McGovern	Walter Mondale	Others	Undecided
The Des Moines Register	November 28–December 6, 1983	296 Democrats	±6%	1%	9%	20%	3%	–	3%	5%	43%	1%	15%
The Des Moines Register	November 28–December 6, 1983	118 LV	±7%	–	12%	16%	3%	–	3%	8%	42%	2%	14%
The Des Moines Register	December 27, 1983 – January 10, 1984	299 Democrats	±6%	–	6%	20%	4%	–	3%	6%	49%	1%	11%
The Des Moines Register	December 27, 1983 – January 10, 1984	108 LV	±10%	1%	6%	21%	6%	–	4%	6%	45%	1%	10%
The Des Moines Register	February 12–16, 1984	66 LV	±12%	–	17%	11%	14%	–	4%	7%	44%	–	3%

== Results ==
Results by county for all candidates except Walter Mondale. Hart McGovern Cranston Askew Uncommitted Tie

Projections based on the initial precinct results gave Mondale 48 of the 50 committed delegates.

The 13,500 delegates selected at the caucuses voted for 3,201 delegates at the county conventions. 1,654 delegates were for Mondale, 949 for Hart, 248 for McGovern, 36 for Jackson, and 314 were uncommitted.

The delegates to the district conventions selected 20 delegates for Mondale, 13 for Hart, and 1 for McGovern despite him having dropped out. Jackson delegates to the 1st district convention staged a walkout after failing to elect a delegate to the state convention. Jackson delegates to the 3rd district convention claimed that five of their ballots were destroyed.

3,201 delegates were eligible to attend the state convention, but only 2,400 participated. Of the delegates present 1,358 were for Mondale, 698 for Hart, 160 for McGovern, 68 for Jackson, 1 for Cranston, and 156 were uncommitted. The state convention selected 15 delegates for Mondale, 7 for Hart, and 2 were uncommitted. A deal was reached between the Hart campaign and the remaining Jackson, McGovern, and uncommitted delegates in which they would support Hart, giving him another delegate, in exchange for Hart giving McGovern one of his at-large delegates. This was done to prevent Mondale from gaining another delegate.

Berkley Bedell, Minnette Doderer, Tom Harkin, Barbara Leach, Tom Miller, Nagle, and Neal Smith served as superdelegates. Six supported Mondale, one supported Hart, and one was uncommitted. Smith was the chair of the delegation to the national convention.

1984 Iowa Democratic presidential caucuses
Candidate	Preference vote	Precinct caucuses	County conventions	District convention delegates	State convention delegates	Total delegates
Walter Mondale	27,896 (44.54%)	1,444.8 (48.9%)	1,654	20	15	35
Gary Hart	9,286 (14.83%)	486.3 (16.5%)	949	13	7	20
George McGovern	7,896 (12.61%)	303.1 (10.3%)	248	1	1	2
Uncommitted	4,701 (7.51%)	277.4 (9.4%)	314	0	1	1
Alan Cranston	5,617 (8.97%)	219.5 (7.4%)	0	0	0	0
John Glenn	3,310 (3.33)	102.2 (3.5%)	0	0	0	0
Reubin Askew	2,084	73.7 (2.5%)	0	0	0	0
Jesse Jackson	1,670 (2.67%)	45.2 (1.5%)	36	0	0	0
Fritz Hollings	165 (0.26%)	1.4 (0.0%)	0	0	0	0
Total	62,625	100%	3,201	34	24	58

=== Delegates ===
Iowa delegates to the 1984 Democratic National Convention
1st district	2nd district	3rd district	4th district	5th district	6th district	Mondale state delegates	Hart state delegates	McGovern state delegates	Superdelegates (Note: Official uncommitted, but stated their presidential preference)
Gerald Messer	Connie Clark	James Kacher	Angelyn King	Rod Halvorson	Betty Strong	Lowell Junkins	Karen Merrick	Bryant Hulstrom	Neal Smith
Patsy Ramacitti	Lloyd Frellinger	Tom Long	Sydney Howe	Sylvia Wilensky	Delbert Laird	Charles Gifford	Steve Lynch		Tom Harkin
Carol Carter	Robert Rundi	Beverly Full	James Wengert	Kim Moll	Virginia Tornell	Phil Kraft	Janice Lyle		Berkley Bedell
Philip Wise	Bridget Janus	Sheila McGuire	Dorothy Woods	Dixon Terry	Dean Loss	Betty Talkington	Kathy Maudsley		Tom Miller
Rizwana Amjed	Rick Dickison	Jeffrey Winick	Fred Strickland Jr.	Louise Tinley	Barbara Hartie	Joy Lowe	Jean Pardee		Minnette Doderer
Patrick McCabe		Arturo Sierra	Jean Dougherty			Russ Woodrick	Nancy Walker		Barbara Leach
			James Carnahan			Larry Hamilton			David R. Nagle
						Raynae Lagunus			
						Cecelia McGuire			
						Ethelene Boyd Owens			

== Endorsements ==
Askew endorsements

Party officials

- Joseph Tilley, chair of the Greene County Democratic Party
Cranston endorsements

Party officials

- David Manley, chair of the Cerro Gordo County Democratic Party (switched from Gary Hart)
Glenn endorsements

Local officials

- Tom Tully, mayor of Dubuque, Iowa (1978)

Party officials

- Lee Campbell, chair of the Union County Democratic Party
- Pat Gilroy, chair of the Johnson County Democratic Party
- Frank Rasmussen, chair of the Scott County Democratic Party
- Billy Snook, chair of the Wayne County Democratic Party
Hart endorsements

Local officials

- Roger Watson, member of the Mason, Iowa city council

Party officials

- ~~David Manley, chair of the Cerro Gordo County Democratic Party~~ (switched endorsement to Alan Cranston)
McGovern endorsements

Party officials

- Stan Kading, co-chair of the Adair County Democratic Party
- Judy Wilson, chair of the Polk County Democratic Party
Mondale endorsements

Federal officials

- Tom Harkin, member of the U.S. House of Representatives from Iowa's 5th congressional district (1975–1985)

State officials

- Donald Avenson, Speaker of the Iowa House of Representatives (1983–1990)
- Lowell Junkins, Majority Leader of the Iowa Senate
- Tom Miller, 31st and 33rd Attorney General of Iowa (1979–1991; 1995–2023)

Party officials

- Edward Campbell, former chair of the Iowa Democratic Party
- Betty Strong, chair of the Woodbury County Democratic Party

== Works cited ==
- Ranney, Austin, ed. (1985). The American Elections of 1984. Duke University Press. ISBN 0822302306.
- The Iowa Official Register: 1991-1992 (PDF). Secretary of State of Iowa. 1993.
- Wormser, Michael, ed. (1984). Elections '84. Congressional Quarterly. ISBN 0871873109.
