= 1984 New Hampshire Democratic presidential primary =

- February 28, 1984

22 Democratic National Convention delegates (20 pledged, 2 unpledged)
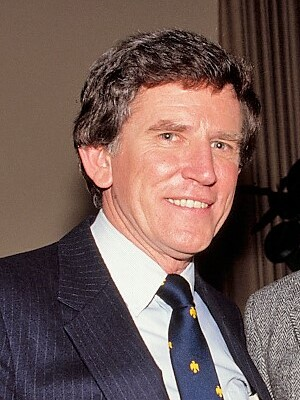

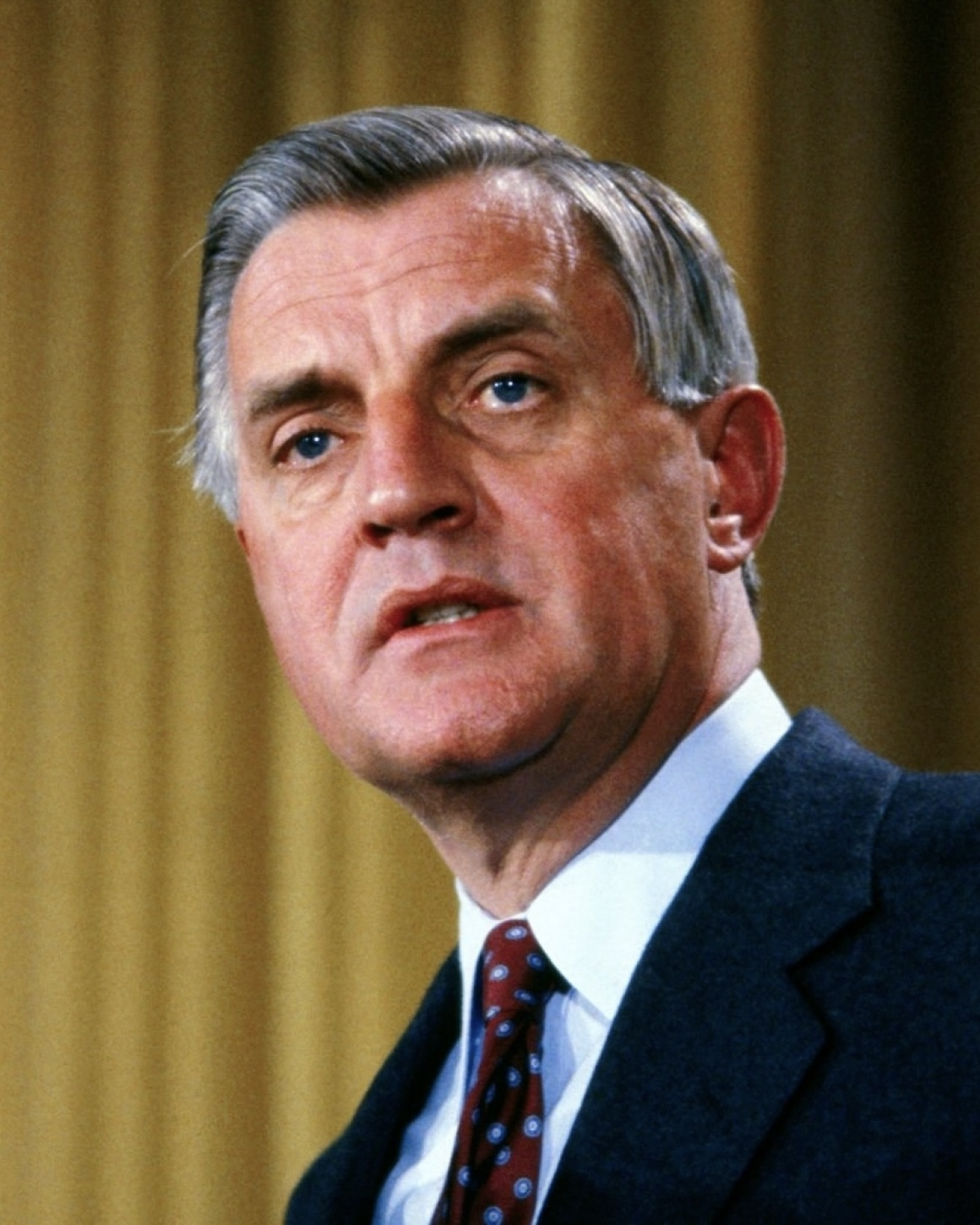

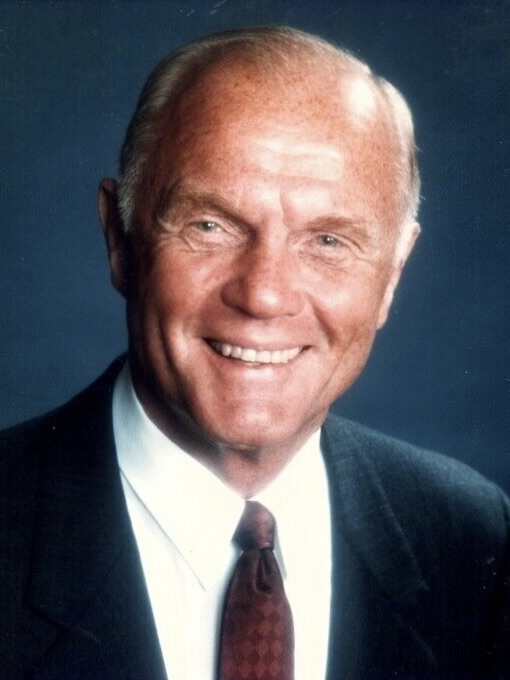

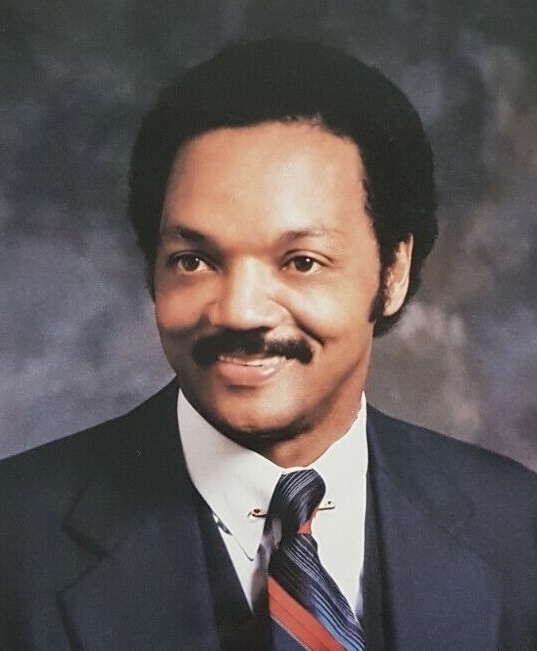

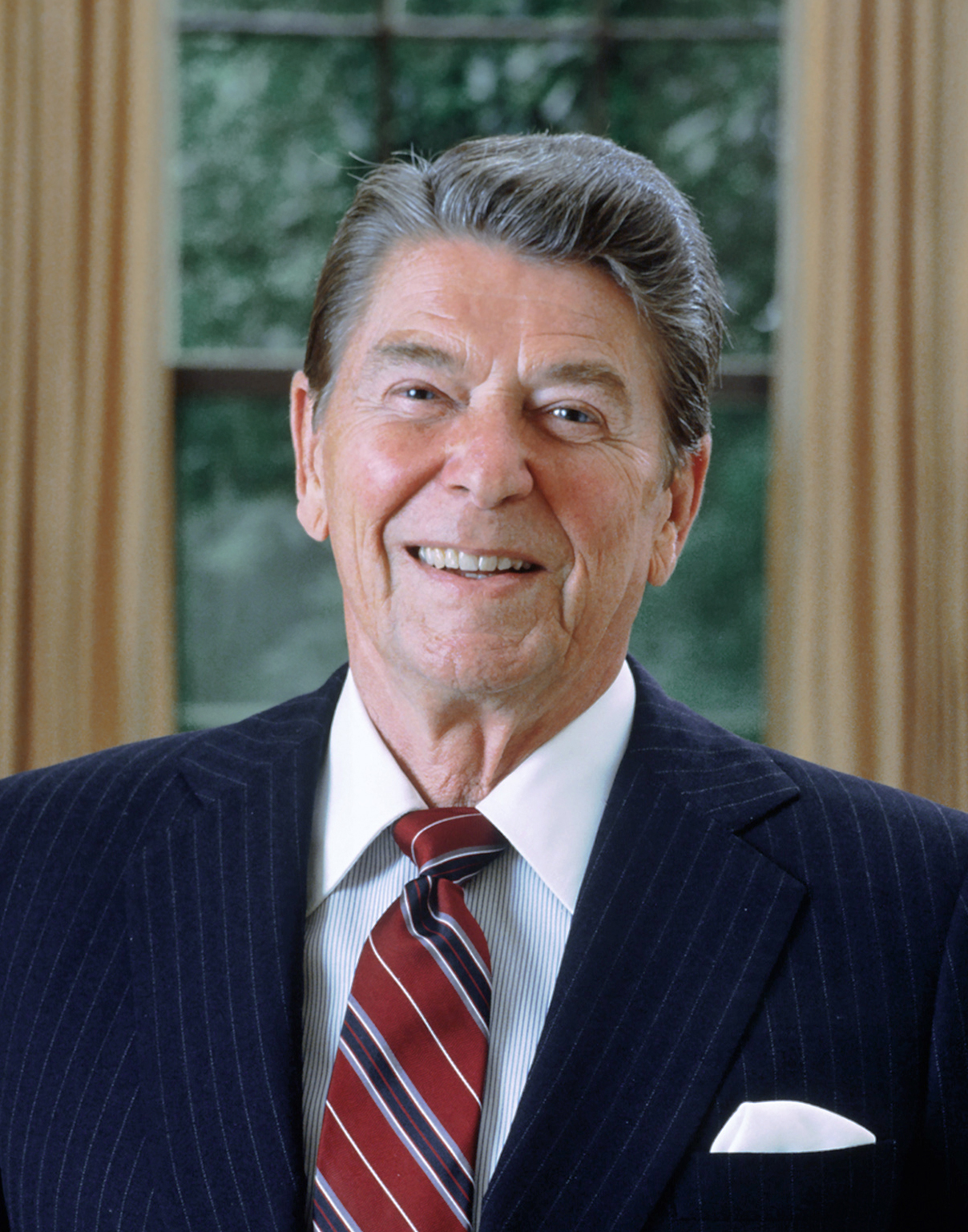
Candidate	Gary Hart	Walter Mondale	John Glenn
Home state	Colorado	Minnesota	Ohio
Delegate count	9 (Note: 6 selected by primary on February 28, and 3 selected on April 15)	9 (Note: 6 selected by primary on February 28, and 3 selected on April 15)	0
Popular vote	37,702	28,173	12,088
Percentage	37.31%	27.88%	11.96%
Candidate	Jesse Jackson	George McGovern	Ronald Reagan (write-in)
Home state	South Carolina	South Dakota	California
Delegate count	0	0	0
Popular vote	5,311	5,217	5,058
Percentage	5.26%	5.16%	5.01%
- County results Hart: 30-40% 40-50% Mondale: 30-40%

The 1984 New Hampshire Democratic presidential primary was held on February 28, 1984, in New Hampshire as one of the Democratic Party's statewide nomination contests ahead of the 1984 United States presidential election.

== Procedure ==
Candidates had to receive a minimum of 16.6% to receive delegates. The primary selected 12 delegates, who then selected the remaining 8 delegates on April 15. George Bruno and Holly Abrams, the chair and vice-chair of the New Hampshire Democratic Party, were superdelegates.

The contest schedule created by the Democratic National Committee placed the New Hampshire primary on March 6, the same day as the non-binding Vermont primary. However, New Hampshire moved its primary to February 28, in violation of these rules, in accordance with a state law that required it to be held at least one week before any other state's primary. Iowa also violated the rules when it moved its caucus to February 20, in order to be eight days before the New Hampshire primary.

Walter Mondale stated that he would boycott any state that held its contest before New Hampshire. Nancy Pelosi, chair of the Delegation Selection Compliance Review Committee, stated that the DNC would strip New Hampshire of its delegation. The DNC chose to not penalize Iowa or New Hampshire.

== Campaign ==
Jeanne Shaheen, who managed Jimmy Carter's primary campaign in New Hampshire in 1976 and 1980, managed Hart's campaign with her husband as co-chair.

51% of voters determined who they were supporting before the Iowa caucus. 31% of these voters supported Mondale, 29% supported Hart, 11% supported John Glenn, and 9% supported Jackson. 14% of voters determined who they were supporting the week before the primary, 12% the weekend before, and 8% the day before. Hart won over 57% of these voters. Hart won 44% of the 15% of voters who selected who they supported on the day of the election.

41% of Jackson voters listed Hart as their second candidate in exit polls conducted by CBS News and The New York Times'.

== Results ==
Hart won a plurality of the popular vote. Reubin Askew, Alan Cranston, and Fritz Hollings ended their campaigns after their poor results in the primary. Hart's victory in the primary propelled his campaign and shifted the standings in the national race as it was initially viewed as a contest between Mondale and Glenn.

Hart and Mondale both won 6 delegates in the primary, receiving three delegates from both congressional districts. Hart mathematically received 3.449 delegates in the 1st district and 3.414 delegates in the 2nd district while Mondale received 2.55 and 2.58 delegates in each district. Both candidates had 9 delegates when the remaining were selected on April 15, and 4 delegates were uncommitted. Mary Chambers was selected as chair of the delegation.

1984 New Hampshire Democratic presidential primary
Candidate	Votes	%	Delegates
Gary Hart	37,702	37.31%	6
Walter Mondale	28,173	27.88%	6
John Glenn	12,088	11.96%	0
Jesse Jackson	5,311	5.26%	0
George McGovern	5,217	5.16%	0
Ronald Reagan (write-in)	5,058	5.01%	0
Fritz Hollings	3,583	3.55%	2
Alan Cranston	2,136	2.11%	0
Reubin Askew	1,025	1.01%	0
Stephen Koczak	155	0.15%	0
Walter Buchanan	132	0.13%	0
Martin Beckman	127	0.13%	0
Edward O'Donnell Jr.	74	0.07%	0
Gerald Willis	50	0.05%	0
William King	34	0.03%	0
Richard Kay	27	0.03%	0
William Kreml	25	0.02%	0
Hugh Bagley	24	0.02%	0
Claude R. Kirk Jr.	24	0.02%	0
Chester Rudnicki	21	0.02%	0
Roy Clendenan	20	0.02%	0
Cyril Sagan	20	0.02%	0
Raymond Caplette	19	0.02%	0
Total	101,045	100%	40

== Works cited ==
- Morgan, Christopher (1985). State of New Hampshire Manual for the General Court. New Hampshire Secretary of State.
- Nelson, Michael, ed. (1985). The Elections of 1984. Congressional Quarterly. ISBN 0871873427.
- Ranney, Austin, ed. (1985). The American Elections of 1984. Duke University Press. ISBN 0822302306.
