= Private limited company =

Type of company used in many jurisdictions

A private limited company (Pvt. Ltd.) is any type of business entity in "private" ownership used in many jurisdictions, in contrast to a publicly listed company, with some differences from country to country. Examples include: the LLC in the United States, private company limited by shares in the United Kingdom, GmbH in Germany and Austria, Besloten vennootschap (BV) in The Netherlands and Belgium, société à responsabilité limitée (SARL) in France, società a responsabilità limitata (S.r.l.) in Italy, and sociedad de responsabilidad limitada (SRL) in the Spanish-speaking world. The benefit of having a private limited company is that there is limited liability.

== Abbreviations ==
Country / Territory	Business form	Abbreviation(s)
Albania	shoqëria me përgjegjësi të kufizuar	sh.p.k.
Kosovo	shoqëria me përgjegjësi të kufizuar	sh.p.k.
Argentina	sociedad de responsabilidad limitada	SRL, S.R.L., S. de R. L.; o Ltda. (Note: "o Ltda." is exclusively used in Chile; while Chilean companies that operate in other South American countries will generally adopt "SRL" to operate in those countries, some maintain "o Ltda." as either part of the company name or use both in official documents.)
Bolivia	sociedad de responsabilidad limitada	SRL, S.R.L., S. de R. L.; o Ltda.
Chile	sociedad de responsabilidad limitada	SRL, S.R.L., S. de R. L.; o Ltda.
Dominican Republic	sociedad de responsabilidad limitada	SRL, S.R.L., S. de R. L.; o Ltda.
Mexico	sociedad de responsabilidad limitada	SRL, S.R.L., S. de R. L.; o Ltda.
Paraguay	sociedad de responsabilidad limitada	SRL, S.R.L., S. de R. L.; o Ltda.
Peru	sociedad de responsabilidad limitada	SRL, S.R.L., S. de R. L.; o Ltda.
Spain	sociedad de responsabilidad limitada	SRL, S.R.L., S. de R. L.; o Ltda.
Uruguay	sociedad de responsabilidad limitada	SRL, S.R.L., S. de R. L.; o Ltda.
Armenia	Սահմանափակ պատասխանատվությամբ ընկերություն (sahmanap'ak pataskhanatvut'yamb ənkerut'yun)	ՍՊԸ (SPƏ)
Australia	proprietary limited company	Pty Ltd
Azerbaijan	məhdud məsuliyyətli cəmiyyət	MMC
Bangladesh	private company limited by shares	Pvt. Ltd. (OPC)
India	private company limited by shares	Pvt. Ltd. (OPC)
Nepal	private company limited by shares	Pvt. Ltd. (OPC)
Bosnia and Herzegovina	društvo s ograničenom odgovornošću	d.o.o. (Note: "д.о.о." in Serbian Cyrillic where Cyrillic is used.)
Croatia	društvo s ograničenom odgovornošću	d.o.o.
Montenegro	društvo s ograničenom odgovornošću	d.o.o.
Serbia	društvo s ograničenom odgovornošću	d.o.o.
North Macedonia	društvo so ograničena odgovornost	d.o.o.
Slovenia	Družba z omejeno odgovornostjo	d.o.o.
Brazil	sociedade limitada	Ltda.
Brunei	شريکت سنديرين برحد (Syarikat sendirian berhad)	Sdn. Bhd.
Malaysia	Sendirian Berhad	Sdn. Bhd.
Bulgaria	Дружество с ограничена отговорност	ООД (OOD)
Bulgaria	Еднолично дружество с ограничена отговорност	ЕООД (EOOD)
Colombia	compañía limitada	Ltda.
Czechia	společnost s ručením omezeným	s.r.o., spol. s r.o.
Slovakia	spoločnosť s ručením obmedzeným	s.r.o., spol. s r.o.
Denmark	anpartsselskab	ApS
Estonia	osaühing	OÜ
Finland	(Yksityinen) osakeyhtiö (Swedish: aktiebolag)	Oy, Ab
Greece	Εταιρεία Περιορισμένης Ευθύνης	Ε.Π.Ε.
Greece	Ιδιωτική Κεφαλαιουχική Εταιρεία	Ι.Κ.Ε.
Hong Kong	private company limited by shares	Ltd.
Ireland	private company limited by shares	Ltd.
Kenya	private company limited by shares	Ltd.
United Kingdom	private company limited by shares	Ltd.
Hungary	korlátolt felelősségű társaság	kft.
Indonesia	Perseroan Terbatas	PT
Iran	Ba Masooliat Mahdood	
Israel	חברה בערבון מוגבל	בע"מ or Ltd.
Italy	società a responsabilità limitata	S.r.l., Srl
Japan	合同会社 (gōdō kaisha)	GK
Latvia	Sabiedrība ar ierobežotu atbildību	SIA
Lithuania	Uždaroji akcinė bendrovė	UAB
Netherlands	besloten vennootschap (met beperkte aansprakelijkheid)	bv
Belgium	besloten vennootschap (met beperkte aansprakelijkheid)	bv
Belgium	société à responsabilité limitée	SRL
France	société à responsabilité limitée	SARL
Luxembourg	société à responsabilité limitée	SARL
Switzerland	société à responsabilité limitée	SARL
Switzerland	società a garanzia limitata	Sagl
Switzerland	Gesellschaft mit beschränkter Haftung	GmbH
Austria	Gesellschaft mit beschränkter Haftung	GmbH
Liechtenstein	Gesellschaft mit beschränkter Haftung	GmbH
Germany	Gesellschaft mit beschränkter Haftung	GmbH
Germany	Unternehmergesellschaft (haftungsbeschränkt)	UG (haftungsbeschränkt)
New Zealand	Limited liability company	Ltd
Pakistan	private company limited by shares (can be multi-member or single-member (SMC))	(Pvt.) Limited (SMC-Pvt.) Limited
Poland	spółka z ograniczoną odpowiedzialnością	sp. z o.o.
Portugal	sociedade por quotas	Lda.
Romania	Societate cu răspundere limitată	SRL
Russia	общество с ограниченной ответственностью	ООО
Singapore	(exempt) private company limited by shares	Pte Ltd
South Africa	private company	(Pty) Ltd
South Korea	유한책임회사 (有限責任會社, yuhan chaeg-im hoesa)	LLC
Sri Lanka	private company limited by shares	(PVT), Ltd
Sweden	privat aktiebolag	AB
Tajikistan	ҷамъияти дорои масъулияти маҳдуд	ҶДММ
Ukraine	Товариство (з обмеженою відповідальністю)	ТОВ (TOV) or ТзОВ (TzOV) (Cyrillic)
United States (may vary by state)	limited liability company (has members, does not issue shares, privately owned)	LLC, LC, "Ltd. Co."
United States (may vary by state)	privately held company (has shareholders, issues shares, can be privately owned)	Co., Corp., Inc., Ltd.
United States (may vary by state)	public benefit corporation (has shareholders, issues shares, can be privately owned)	PBC
Uzbekistan	Masʼuliyati cheklangan jamiyati	MChJ
Vietnam	Công ty trách nhiệm hữu hạn	(Cty) TNHH
Zimbabwe	private company limited by shares	(Pvt) Ltd

== Albania ==
In Albania, a limited liability company (Albanian: Shoqëri me përgjegjësi të kufizuar Sh.p.k) is a commercial company founded by persons of physical or judicial status, who are not liable for the company and personally bear losses only up to the outstanding contribution agreements. Partners' contributions constitute the registered capital of a limited liability company. Each partner has his quota in the company in proportion to the contribution of the capital so the registered capital of the company is divided between the partners based on the proportional ratio of their contribution. In Albania a limited liability company may not have a capital of less than 100 lek.

== Argentina ==
Although not an exact equivalent, the Argentine variant of the LLC is called Sociedad de Responsabilidad Limitada (S.R.L.) and it limits the liability of its members up to their capital contribution in the company. The equity is divided into equal stakes (can not be called "shares"), each one of which represents a percentage of the company and that can not be traded on the stock exchange. Their by-laws are regulated by law N° 19550 and the commercial partnership is limited to a maximum of 50 partners.

== Bolivia ==
In Bolivia, the LLC variant is called Sociedad de Responsabilidad Limitada (S.R.L.). These companies' legal framework consist in the Trade Code (Decree Law N° 14379 of February 25, 1977), its modifications and other supplementary laws. The members participate in it through capital stakes, and their liability is limited to the value of their contributions. The number of members must be minimum 2 and maximum 25.

== Bosnia and Herzegovina ==
Bosnian and Herzegovinian legislation, similarly to that in Serbia, Montenegro, North Macedonia contemplates LLCs as društvo s ograničenom odgovornošću (d.o.o.). Companies using this structure append the abbreviation d.o.o. to their company name. A shareholder or member in a d.o.o. is only personally liable up to the value of the member's investment in the company.

== Brazil ==
The corporate structure in Brazilian law most similar to the American LLC is the Sociedade Limitada ("Ltda."), under the new Brazilian Civil Code of 2002. The sociedade limitada is the new name of the sociedade por quotas de responsabilidade limitada, and it can be organized as empresária or simples, under this new code, roughly corresponding to the form types of comercial ("commercial") and civil ("non commercial") of the Commercial Code. A new law in Brazil has made it legal to obtain an LLC by a sole-proprietor in two forms: Empresa Individual de Responsabilidade Limitada (Eireli for short), or Sociedade Unipessoal Limitada ("Ltda."). The main requirement for an Eireli is a capital of 100 times the current minimum wage, R$ 78.800,00 (US$26.267.00) as of 2015; whereas for a Sociedade Unipessoal Limitada the same rules apply as for other Sociedades Limitadas

== Bulgaria ==
Bulgarian legislation corresponds LLCs (Ltd, GmbH, SARL, etc.) as "Дружество с ограничена отговорност" (Druzhestvo s ogranichena otgovornost; company with limited liability). Companies incorporated under this structure append the cyrillic abbreviation ООД (Latin script: OOD) to their name. In the case of an LLC incorporated with a sole-shareholder/member (sole-ownership), this is designated and known as "Еднолично дружество с ограничена отговорност" (Ednolichno druzhestvo s ogranichena otgovornost; sole-ownership company with limited liability) and abbreviated as ЕООД (EOOD). The EOOD specifically, is exempted from annual, general or extraordinary meetings for making decisions and may just issue written resolutions.

As part of the European Union Bulgarian companies can obtain an EU VAT registration number for cross-border trade within the EU, can be searched by both VIES and BRIS.

== Colombia ==
Colombian legislation contemplates a very similar structure as mentioned above in the Chilean case. The Ltda. abbreviation is also used in Colombia.

== Croatia ==
In Croatia, a private limited liability company is termed društvo s ograničenom odgovornošću (literal: limited liability company), abbreviated d.o.o.. A public limited liability company is termed a dioničko društvo (literal: joint stock company) abbreviated d.d..

As part of the European Union Croatian companies can obtain an EU VAT registration number for cross-border trade within the EU, can be searched by both VIES and BRIS.

== Czechia ==
Czech legislation contemplates LLCs as společnost s ručením omezeným (s.r.o. or spol. s r.o.). An s.r.o. is not technically comparable to an LLC because the profits are still subject to double taxation. Czech law does not offer a possibility to start up a limited company without the possibility of avoiding double taxation. As of 2014 the liability is not limited in Czech, since managing director (jednatel, mandatory board member in Czech LLCs) bears full liability that extends to all of his/her property, including private one.

As part of the European Union Czech companies can obtain an EU VAT registration number for cross-border trade within the EU, can be searched by both VIES and BRIS.

== Denmark ==
The Danish form of the LLC is the kommanditselskab (K/S). There is no minimum capital requirements. In a K/S there are two types of shareholders, the komplementar which is fully liable, and the kommanditist which liability is limited. The K/S is a tax-transparent company, which means the income "passes through" the company directly to the shareholders.

As part of the European Union Danish companies can obtain an EU VAT registration number for cross-border trade within the EU, can be searched by both VIES and BRIS.

== Dominican Republic ==
Dominican Republic legislation contemplates LLCs as Sociedad de Responsabilidad Limitada, also known by their abbreviation S.R.L. S.R.L.s award limited liability to their members up to their contribution in the company (i.e., contribution of capital). This type of company began after the law number 479 of the year 2008.

== Estonia ==
The Estonian version of private limited company (limited liability company) is called osaühing (OÜ). The type of entity is also required to be identified in the name. An OÜ is taxed as a corporation. The minimum capital required by law is as low as €0.01 per shareholder.

As part of the European Union Estonian companies can obtain an EU VAT registration number for cross-border trade within the EU, can be searched by both VIES and BRIS.

== Finland ==
Although not an exact equivalent, the Finnish version of the LLC is the Oy (osakeyhtiö) or in Swedish Ab (aktiebolag). An Oy is taxed as a corporation. Since 1 July 2019, there is no minimum capital required by law.

As part of the European Union Finnish companies can obtain an EU VAT registration number for cross-border trade within the EU, can be searched by both VIES and BRIS.

== Germany ==
Because of its hybrid characteristics it is very difficult to determine the German equivalent. On one hand it is possible to consider it as a kind of Gesellschaft mit beschränkter Haftung (GmbH) because it has aspects of a corporation; on the other hand it could be considered to be a kind of Kommanditgesellschaft (KG), which is the German equivalent of a limited partnership. Based on the literal translation of the word "company", an LLC should be considered to be a kind of KG without any liable partner. The German equivalent that comes closest to LLC, is GmbH & Co KG, a nested Kommanditgesellschaft (KG) where a Gesellschaft mit beschränkter Haftung (GmbH) takes the role of the fully liable partner. For the purpose of taxation, the Bundesfinanzministerium (German Federal Ministry of Finance) gives detailed guidelines of the circumstances under which an LLC is to be considered to be a "corporation" or as a "limited partnership". It is useful to note, however, that the original LLC statutes of Wyoming and other US states were more or less explicitly modeled after the GmbH.

As part of the European Union German companies can obtain an EU VAT registration number for cross-border trade within the EU, can be searched by both VIES and BRIS.

== Greece ==
A limited liability company (LLC) in Greece is synonymous to an EPE (ΕΠΕ - Εταιρεία Περιορισμένης Ευθύνης).

As part of the European Union Greek companies can obtain an EU VAT registration number for cross-border trade within the EU, can be searched by both VIES and BRIS.

== Hong Kong ==
In Hong Kong, the Limited Company is the most commonly incorporated type of company and bears the characteristics of a Limited Liability Company. The core characteristics of a Hong Kong Limited Company include: i) it requires a minimum of one shareholder and one director (can be the same person), ii) a Hong Kong company requires a company secretary resident in HK, iii) foreign ownership is allowed, iv) company shareholders have limited liability and v) the company must have registered HK address.

Entrepreneurs who register a company in Hong Kong can choose a Hong Kong offshore company. This company structure is basically a HK Limited Company but all business is conducted outside of Hong Kong. The advantage of this structure is that all business income that is sourced outside of Hong Kong is tax exempt.

== Hungary ==
Hungarian legislation contemplates LLCs as korlátolt felelősségű társaság. Companies working under this structure append the abbreviation Kft. to their name (spelled capitalized as part of the name). Hungarian LLCs are required to have a 3 million HUF (Hungarian forint; approx. US$10,000) starting capital. The time of formation by the new electronic formation option has been reduced from 2 weeks to 2 hours, additional cost of formation is around 100,000 HUF (approx. US$340). Kft.s can be formed by the cooperation of lawyers.

The Hungarian kft. is the most common form of doing business in Hungary.

As part of the European Union Hungarian companies can obtain an EU VAT registration number for cross-border trade within the EU, can be searched by both VIES and BRIS.

== Iceland ==
According to Icelandic legislation, there are two main types of LLC forms, private and public held limited liability forms. Private LLC is abbreviated "Ehf." The minimum capital of 500,000 Icelandic krónas (kr.). Public LLC is abbreviated "Hf." with minimum capital of 4,000,000 kr.

As part of the European Union Icelandic companies can obtain an EU VAT registration number for cross-border trade within the EU, can be searched by both VIES and BRIS.

== India ==
Almost 93 percent of the companies incorporated in India are registered as Private Limited Companies.

The Ministry of Corporate Affairs is the governing body which regulates all Private Limited Companies in India. The main law regulating Private Limited Companies is the Companies Act 2013.

Prior to 2015, the shareholders (known as members) had to pay a minimum of ₹1 lakh (equivalent to ₹1.6 lakh or US$1,700 in 2026) as a subscription amount to incorporate a private limited company. A private limited company can have at most 200 members. A company with one member is referred to as a One Person Company.

The Companies Act, 2013 is the regulating Act along with the Rules (Delegated Legislation), Notices, Circulars and Notifications issued by the Ministry of Corporate Affairs.

To incorporate a Private Limited Company in India, minimum 2 directors and 2 shareholders (members) are required. Both the directors and the shareholders can be the same person. Further, it is mandatory that at least one of the director is an Indian national. In order to incorporate a Private Limited Company in India, various forms are required to be filed such as Spice+, eMOA(Memorandum of Association), eAOA(Article of Association), and Agile Pro with Ministry of Corporate Affairs.

== Iran ==
As of 2015, there are seven types of companies which can be registered under Iran's company registration law. One of these seven types of companies and partnerships refers to LLPs. Like many other countries, two persons are required to form an LLP in Iran. Each person has his/her own shares and is responsible for business liability equivalent to his/her share percentage. LLPs in Iran are named according to the format illustrated by the following example: "Sherkat Ba Masooliyate Mahdood" translates as "Sherkat شرکت Company" + "Mahdood محدود Limited" + "Masooliyat مسئولیت Liability".

== Italy ==
The Italian Civil Code, approved in 1942 and as amended by the Government Act 6/2003 and furthers modifications, mainly provides three forms of limited liability company:

- Società per azioni (S.p.A.): the minimum required starting capital for an SpA is €50,000. The capital is divided into shares (azioni) that can be transferred by endorsement or bought and sold on stock exchange. Only SpAs can be quoted in stock exchange market, issue corporate bonds, and other financial instruments. SpA form and a higher capital are required by law to operate in protected businesses (i.e. banks, leasing companies, etc.).
- Società a responsabilità limitata (Srl): the minimum required starting capital for an Srl is €10,000. Its capital is divided into stakes (quote) which can be bought or sold just by notarial act. Srls can issue corporate bonds but are subject to many limitations. Similar to the Srl is the Società Cooperativa a Responsabilità Limitata (Scarl) whose scope is not making profit but give benefits to stakes' holders.
- Società in accomandita per azioni (Sapa): the minimum required starting capital for a Sapa is €120,000 divided into shares. Sapas have a mixed liability scheme, where standard shareholders have limited liability while managing shareholders have full liability. Except this, SAPAs are exactly like SPAs even if uncommon.

Companies append the corresponding abbreviation to their company names.

As part of the European Union Italian companies can obtain an EU VAT registration number for cross-border trade within the EU, can be searched by both VIES and BRIS.

== Japan ==
Japan passed legislation in 1996 creating a new type of business organization, godo kaisha (J-LLC), a close variant of the American LLC. Japanese Tax authority does not consider J-LLC (Godo-Kaisha) a pass-through entity, but as a taxable entity.

== Latvia ==
Limited liability company in Latvia is referred to as sabiedrība ar ierobežotu atbildību (SIA). SIA is taxed as a corporation. The minimum share capital required by law is €2,800. But it is allowed to set up SIA with share capital €1.00, but it must be increased to minimum share capital €2,800 by increasing share capital with money or by moving at least 25% from annual profit until capital will be €2,800.

As part of the European Union Latvian companies can obtain an EU VAT registration number for cross-border trade within the EU, can be searched by both VIES and BRIS.

== Mexico ==
Mexican legislation contemplates LLCs as Sociedades de Responsabilidad Limitada (including Sociedades de Responsabilidad Limitada de Capital Variable), also known for their abbreviation "S. de R.L." (or "S de R.L. de C.V.") (limited liability company or limited liability company with/of variable capital). S. de R.L.'s award limited liability to its members up to their contribution in the company (i.e., contribution of capital) and also act as pass-through or flow-through entities whereby profits are "passed-through" to its members, avoiding double taxation. This type of company is widely used by foreign investors in Mexico because of its "pass-through" modality and its "check the box" capability under the IRC (Internal Revenue Code of the U.S.).

== Moldova ==
Moldovan legislation contemplates LLCs as Societate cu Răspundere Limitată, abbreviated "S.R.L.", and are regulated member(s)-founder(s), and other non-founder members, minimum one member-founder and maximum total of 50 members, at least one of them must be the founder of the company, but all of the 50 could be also founders.

== North Macedonia ==
Macedonian legislation contemplates LLCs as Друштво со ограничена одговорност (Drushtvo so ogranichena odgovornost). Companies working under this structure append the abbreviation д.о.о. (d.o.o.) to their name. The minimum required starting capital for a d.o.o. is €5,000.

== Norway ==
In Norway, the closest to an LLC is probably the kommandittselskap (KS). In a K/S there are two types of participants, one komplementar which is fully liable, and one or more kommandittist, with limited liability. There are minimum capital requirements. The KS is a tax-transparent company, which means the income "passes through" the company directly to the shareholders.

== Pakistan ==
In Pakistan, LLCs are known as private companies that end (Local Liability Company) with Pvt. Ltd. They should have at least Rs. 100,000 as their minimum paid up capital.

The Securities and Exchange Commission of Pakistan (SECP) has made it mandatory for all listed companies to file their documents, returns, accounts and applications through the commission's eServices online filing facility, earlier, this requirement was only applicable to the companies, which had been incorporated through eServices online filing facility.

== Peru ==
There is no direct equivalent of an LLC in Peru, but some similar corporate forms include:

- Sociedad anónima cerrada (S.A.C.), a corporation which must have at least two and not more than twenty shareholders; its shares may not be offered to the public and cannot be traded on the stock exchange.
- Sociedad comercial de responsabilidad limitada (S.R.L.), a commercial partnership divided in equal participations which may not be called "shares". It must have at least two and not more than twenty partners.
- Sociedad civil de responsabilidad limitada (S. Civil de R. L.), a professional partnership of at least two and not more than thirty individuals, with co-owner participation in the form of capital, of professional contribution, or of any combination of both.
- Empresa individual de responsabilidad limitada (E.I.R.L.), a legal entity with one single owner.

The capital for any of the above entities is freely determined by its statutes. There is no minimum requirement except for entities with certain types of activities, mainly in the financial markets, and then irrespective of their type.

== Poland ==
In Poland, a limited liability company is referred to literally as "company with limited liability" (spółka z ograniczoną odpowiedzialnością), legally abbreviated as sp. z o.o. (or sometimes Sp. z o.o. in particular names). Informally, in the Polish speaking slang, it is abbreviated as spółka zoo (pronounced with a long "o", as in "tow."). Sp. z o.o. has a separate legal personality from the shareholders.

The minimum start capital is 5,000 PLN (since 2009; until then, 50,000 PLN).

Sp. z o.o. is the most popular corporate form of doing business in Poland. Sp. z o.o. may be registered governmental S24 platform and must be registered in the National Court Register (Krajowy Rejestr Sądowy) and are subject to reporting and tax obligations.

As part of the European Union Polish companies can obtain an EU VAT registration number for cross-border trade within the EU, can be searched by both VIES and BRIS.

== Portugal ==
In Portugal, LLCs are called "Sociedades por Quotas", that is, "company by shares", usually abbreviated Lda.. They are tax subject, and company shares cannot be sold in a public market, since 2006 the transference of them is not required to be done in the presence of a civil law notary, except if the company owns buildings, in the same way other major properties have to be sold. Nonetheless, the responsibility of the partners is limited to the capital share they hold, and there is no minimum capital required by law for a Lda. in excess of the minimum value of €1 per share, and thus per partner. The capital is not required to be deposited at the time of the registration of the company, instead the share holders have until 31 December of the year the registry was made.

As part of the European Union Portuguese companies can obtain an EU VAT registration number for cross-border trade within the EU, can be searched by both VIES and BRIS.

== Romania ==
Romania recognizes the limited liability company since 1990 under the name of societate cu răspundere limitată (S.R.L.), in which the owners are personally liable for the company obligations within the limit of their contribution to social capital. The minimum start capital is no longer 200 RON, it was reduced to 1 RON which currently amounts to less than €0.2.

As part of the European Union Romanian companies can obtain an EU VAT registration number for cross-border trade within the EU, can be searched by both VIES and BRIS.

== Russia ==
In Russia and certain other former Soviet countries, an entity with a somewhat similar structure is known as Obshchestvo s ogranichennoy otvetstvennost'yu (lit. ' company with limited liability'), usually abbreviated OOO, or in some CIS countries as OcOO.

Although a Russian limited liability company shares the same name with an American LLC, it is different in many ways. Most importantly, a Russian LLC is not tax transparent: the company is taxed at the corporate level, and then, upon distribution of dividends, shareholders pay income tax (personal or corporate).

A limited liability company is the most popular form of legal undertaking in Russia for simple shareholding structures.

The minimum capital required is 10,000 Russian rubles.

Also, Russia has public and non-public joint-stock companies under the Federal Law No. 208-FZ of 26.12.1995 "On Joint-Stock Companies" . The minimum capital required is 10,000 Russian rubles for non-public joint-stock company and 100,000 Russian rubles for public joint-stock company.

== Serbia ==
Serbia legislation contemplates limited company as Друштво са ограниченом одговорношћу but functioning it is more similar to limited partnership. For many other reasons for example as in the Czech Republic, a d.o.o. is not technically comparable to an LLC because the profits are still subject to double taxation. The minimum capital required by law is 100 RSD, which is currently less than €1.

== Slovakia ==
In Slovakia, the law contemplates spoločnosť s ručením obmedzeným (abbreviation spol. s r. o. or s. r. o.) or as the rough equivalent of a limited liability company. It is very popular form of business organization due to ensurance of limited liability in exchange for a relatively small investment into the registered capital. From one to 50 associates can found it through a founding agreement with minimum registered capital of €5000, minimum €750 per person, in money or other property. (§ 105–153 of Act. No 513/1991 Coll. – Commercial Code as amended.)

As part of the European Union, Slovak companies can obtain an EU VAT registration number for cross-border trade within the EU, can be searched by both VIES and BRIS.

== Slovenia ==
Slovenian legislation contemplates LLCs as družba z omejeno odgovornostjo. Companies working under this structure append the abbreviation d. o. o. to their name. The minimum required starting capital for a d. o. o. is €7,500. Due to the high cost and complicated bookkeeping of a real corporation, this is a more widespread form.

As part of the European Union Slovenian companies can obtain an EU VAT registration number for cross-border trade within the EU, can be searched by both VIES and BRIS.

== Spain ==
In Spain, LLCs are called Sociedad de responsabilidad limitada (SRL), "company of limited responsibility", or sociedad limitada (SL), or "limited partnership". They are tax subject, and company shares cannot be sold in a public market, the transference of them having to be done compulsorily in the presence of a civil law notary, in the same way other major properties have to be sold. Nonetheless, the responsibility of the partners is limited to the capital share they hold, and the minimum capital required by law for a S.L. is at least €3,000.

As part of the European Union Spanish companies can obtain an EU VAT registration number for cross-border trade within the EU, can be searched by both VIES and BRIS.

== Sweden ==
Sweden has no equivalent of an LLC. The closest company form is the handelsbolag (lit. ' trade company'). The Swedish AB (aktiebolag; lit.: "share company"), like the handelsbolag, is a tax subject and is more similar to a US C Corporation than an LLC. The minimum capital required by law in a private company, privat aktiebolag, is SEK 25,000, although this may be in the form of assets as well as capital. The AB structure requires shareholders, a board of directors, and regular meetings of both, together with complete accounts once per year. Depending on the size of the AB, the accounts may have to be audited. Creation or purchase "off-the-shelf" of an AB is relatively cheap and tax effective, but liquidation of a created aktiebolag can be an expensive and time-consuming operation. Creation of public limited liability companies, or publikt aktiebolag, which can raise capital from the public, requires a minimum capitalization of SEK 500,000, however the overall regulation of public companies in Sweden, especially regarding accounting methods and taxes, is thorough and detailed.

As part of the European Union Swedish companies can obtain an EU VAT registration number for cross-border trade within the EU, can be searched by both VIES and BRIS.

== Switzerland ==
The Swiss Code of Obligations provides for different kinds of companies with limited liability, the two most commonly used are:

Swiss Limited Liability Company: The terms for this kind of company used in the three official languages of the Swiss Confederation are as follows: In German Gesellschaft mit beschränkter Haftung (abbreviation: GmbH), in French Société à responsabilité limitée (abbreviation: S.à r.l. or SARL) and in Italian Società a Garanzia Limitata (abbreviation: SaGL). A Swiss LLC is similar to an LLC with respect to various matters, including the following: Members may also be natural persons, corporations, partnerships or other LLCs, the liability of a member of a Swiss LLC to pay for the LLC's obligations is limited to its capital contribution, a Swiss LLC may be either member-managed or manager-managed, and, unless otherwise provided for in the operating agreement, the members’ right to control or manage a Swiss LLC is proportionate to their individual membership interest. The membership interests in a Swiss LLC have to be registered and, thus, they may only be issued in the name of a member but not to the bearer.

Swiss Corporation (in English common law context usually translated as company limited by shares): The terms for this kind of company used in the three official languages of the Swiss Confederation are as follows: In German Aktiengesellschaft (abbreviation: AG), in French Société Anonyme (abbreviation: SA) and in Italian Società Anonima (abbreviation: SA). A Swiss corporation is with respect to various matters different from an LLC (including a Swiss LLC): Most important is that a Swiss corporation may, neither by default nor by exercising any respective option provided by the Swiss law, be member-managed like an LLC, as the respective mandatory provisions of Swiss law provide that the board of directors has certain non-transferable duties. Furthermore, the shares of a Swiss corporation may also be issued to the bearer (bearer shares) and, thus, not only in the name of a holder (registered shares), which, however, applies to the membership interests in a Swiss LLC, which may only be registered.

== Tajikistan ==
In Tajikistan, the same as in Russia, an entity with a somewhat similar structure is known as "Ҷамъияти дорои масъулияти маҳдуд", Chamiyti Doroi Masuliyti Machdud, abbreviated as "ҶДММ".

== Thailand ==
Most kinds of commercial organisations with an annual turnover of more than ฿1,800,000.00 are supposed to register a Limited Company with verified capital of at least ฿1,800,000.00 and pay VAT sales tax. The process of incorporation is however complex and needs to be prepared by an accredited law firm or accountant. It includes the registration for VAT. The company registration number is the same as the Tax ID number which must then figure on all invoices and sales receipts with VAT breakdown shown separately. For most purposes, foreign nationals are not permitted to be share holders or declared board members although there are exceptions for very high level investors.

== Turkey ==
Minimum capital should be 10,000 TL. That capital could be the minimum total capital of company. Number of founding shareholders (real persons or legal entities) could be minimum 1 and maximum 50. All or some of the shareholders could be foreign nationals. There is no issued stock certificates and all shareholders liability is limited to their registered capital amount. 1/4 of capital should be blocked in a Bank until procedure of registration ends. The equivalent of LLC for Turkish is Ltd. Şti. (Which means Limited Şirketi.)

== Ukraine ==
This type of entity has existed in Ukraine since the 1990s. LLC is the most common type of business entity in Ukraine. In Ukrainian, it is spelled "Товариство з обмеженою відповідальністю" (abbreviated – TОВ, TзОВ), in transliteration "Tovarystvo z Obmezhenoyu Vidpovidalnistyu," that is, "company with limited liability".

By Ukrainian law LLC is a legal person. Authorized capital of LLC is divided into shares (or stakes), the amount of which is determined by the charter. LLC is responsible to the creditors only with its assets. Legal entities (foreign or Ukrainian companies) individuals, regardless of their country of citizenship or residency can be the founders (participants) of LLC. Limited liability company can be formed either by one person or by several individuals or legal entities (corporations). Maximum number of participants (founders) of LLC in Ukraine is 100. Since 2014 registration procedure has been significantly simplified in Ukraine. Minimum amount of authorised capital is 1 (one) hryvnia (less than 0,04 US cents). There is no state fee for LLC formation.

By Ukrainian Law LLC dividend payment is possible after the declaration of company's income or profit to the fiscal/tax authorities and the approval of the income statement. Thus, regardless of the tax system, LLC can make dividend payments up to 4 times a year, or one time a quarter.

Taxation. LLC can be registered:

- as corporate/profit tax (18% rate) with or without VAT (up to 20% rate, depends on product or service) tax payer;
- fixed tax rate (in transliteration "yediniy podatok" or "sproschena sistema opodatkuvannia") is a 5% rate from revenue, with or without (on request) VAT registration.

== United Arab Emirates ==
A Limited Liability Company (LLC) is the most common type of registration in the UAE and is recommended where the purpose of the entity is to make sales within the region. 100% foreign ownership of such an entity is not permitted. Under the UAE Commercial Companies Law (CCL), foreign investors are permitted to hold up to 49 per cent equity ownership in UAE companies and 51 per cent of the equity must be held at all times by one or more UAE nationals. In accordance with Article (218) of the CCL a Limited Liability Company can be formed by a minimum of 2 and a maximum of 50 shareholders whose liability is limited to their shares in the capital of the company. Recent amendments to Article (217) of the CCL that came into force in June 2009 removed the requirement for minimum share capital (previously AED 300,000 in Dubai and AED 150,000 in other Emirates) allowing founders of a limited liability company the freedom to determine the company's share capital which could be less than the earlier prescribed bottom line. Shares of an LLC are not open for subscription by the public. Despite the split in shareholdings, profits may be divided in other ratios agreed upon, taking into consideration efforts of foreign partners in management, provision of technology or expertise. Responsibility for the management of a LLC can be vested in the foreign partner or UAE national partners or a third party. A LLC must appoint a minimum of one manager and up to a maximum of five managers for the business. Managers must be appointed by a Memorandum of Association or by a management contract, for a fixed term or an unlimited term. Unless the Memorandum of Association states otherwise, the manager has full powers of administration and management of the LLC. LLCs are not allowed to practice their activities in the UAE without a Trade License and Commercial Registration Certificate.

== United Kingdom ==
The new form of limited liability partnership (LLP), created in 2000, is similar to a US LLC in being tax neutral: member partners are taxed at the partner level, but the LLP itself pays no tax. It is treated as a body corporate for all other purposes including VAT. Otherwise, all companies, including limited companies and US LLCs, are treated as bodies corporate subject to United Kingdom corporation tax if the profits of the entity belong to the entity and not to its members.

== United States ==
In the United States, the term "privately held company" can either refer to a limited liability company or a corporation. By default, all corporations are privately held. Corporations have to get permission from the Securities and Exchange Commission (SEC) to offer shares to the public. As a result, all newly formed corporations are automatically classified as privately owned.

One of the big differences between a limited liability company (LLC) and a corporation is that a corporation can issue stock and an LLC cannot. LLCs are structured like a partnership, whereas a corporation is structured like a private limited company.

A limited liability company (LLC) is a relatively new business structure authorized by state statutes. The LLC is chiefly inspired by the GmbH ("Company with limited liability"), a type of business organization in Germany, and by the limitada, a type of business organization available in many Latin American countries.

In the United States, the first limited liability company act appeared in Wyoming in 1977 as special interest legislation for an oil company. In 1980, the Internal Revenue Service issued a private letter ruling to an LLC formed under the Wyoming LLC Act, indicating that the IRS would treat the LLC as a partnership for federal tax purposes. However, later that year, the IRS proposed regulations that would deny partnership classification to any business entity in which no member bore personal responsibility for the entity's liabilities. In 1982, Florida adopted an LLC act modeled on Wyoming's LLC Act. Due to uncertainty over the tax treatment of LLCs, no other states introduced LLC legislation until after 1988. In 1988, the IRS issued a revenue ruling stating that it would treat a Wyoming-style LLC as a partnership for tax purposes. By 1996, nearly every state had enacted an LLC statute. The National Conference of Commissioners on Uniform State Laws adopted the Uniform Limited Liability Company Act in 1996 and revised it in 2006.

A potential disadvantage specific to the United States is that LLCs are not considered to be corporations for the purposes of federal civil procedure; they are instead treated as partnerships. This affects the applicability of diversity jurisdiction in cases involving LLCs, barring application of diversity jurisdiction when even one member of the LLC is a citizen of the same state as one of the opposing parties. Should one member of an LLC be a citizen of a state of which one of the opposing parties is a citizen, any case between the LLC and those parties must be heard in that state's courts; corporations enjoy a more complete legal personhood that only denies diversity jurisdiction when the opposing party is a citizen of the state in which the corporation is incorporated (most commonly Delaware for large corporations, which has a small population) or has its principal place of business. Of course, this could also be considered an advantage for a party that would prefer to remain in state court in instances where the opposing party seeks to remove a matter to federal court.

AOL was set up as an LLC during its ownership by Time Warner from 2001 to 2008. There is a similar setup for BMW's American subsidiary, BMW of North America, LLC. Chrysler has been an LLC since restructuring during the auto industry bailout of 2009, owned by Fiat Chrysler Automobiles N.V.

== See also ==
- Besloten vennootschap met beperkte aansprakelijkheid, a Belgian (bvba) and Dutch (bv) private limited company
- Incorporation (business)
- Limited liability partnership (LLP)
- List of legal entity types by country
- List of official business registers
- Private company limited by shares
- société à responsabilité limitée, LLCs in the French-speaking countries
- Wholly Foreign-Owned Enterprise
