= Limited company =

Type of business entity

A limited company (Ltd.) is a company in which the liability of members or subscribers of the company is limited to what they have invested or guaranteed to the company. Limited companies may be limited by shares or by guarantee. In a company limited by shares, the liability of members is limited to the unpaid value of shares. In a company limited by guarantee, the liability of owners is limited to such an amount as the owners may undertake to contribute to the assets of the company in the event of being wound up. The former may be further divided into public companies (public limited companies) and private companies (private limited companies). Who may become a member of a private limited company is restricted by law and by the company's rules. In contrast, anyone may buy shares in a public limited company.

Limited companies can be found in most countries, although the detailed rules governing them vary widely. It is also common for a distinction to be made between the publicly tradable companies of the plc type (for example, the German Aktiengesellschaft (AG), Dutch and Belgian nv, British PLC, Czech a.s., Italian S.p.A., Hungarian nyrt. and the Spanish, French, Polish, Greek, and Romanian S.A.), and the "private" types of companies (such as the German GmbH, Dutch and Belgian bv, Portuguese Lda., British Ltd, Japanese G.K., Polish sp. z o.o., Russian ООО, Ukrainian ТОВ (TOV), the Czech s.r.o., the French s.à r.l., the Italian s.r.l., Romanian s.r.l., Hungarian kft., Bulgarian ДОО (DOO), Slovenian d.o.o., and Slovak s.r.o., in India Pvt Ltd for private company and Ltd for public company, in Singapore Pte Ltd for private company).

== Types ==
=== Private company limited by guarantee ===
This is a company that does not have share capital but is guaranteed by its members, who agree to pay a fixed amount in the event of the company's liquidation. Charitable organisations are often incorporated using this form of limited liability. Another example is the Financial Conduct Authority. In Australia, only an unlisted public company can be limited by guarantee.

=== Private company limited by shares ===
Private companies limited by shares have shareholders with limited liability, and their shares are not permitted to be offered to the general public. Shareholders in such companies are typically obligated to first offer their shares to existing shareholders before considering selling them to external parties.

=== Public limited company ===
A public limited company can be publicly traded on a stock exchange; this is similar to the U.S. Corporation (Corp.) and the German Aktiengesellschaft (AG).

== In specific countries ==
=== Australia ===
The private company equivalent in Australia is the Proprietary Limited company (Pty Ltd). An Australian company with only Limited or Ltd after its name is a public company, such as a company listed on the ASX. Australia does not have a direct equivalent to the plc.

A shareholder in a limited company, in the event of its becoming insolvent (equivalent to insolvency in the United Kingdom) would be liable to contribute the amount remaining unpaid on the shares (usually zero, as most shares are issued fully paid). "Paid" here relates to the amount paid to the company for the shares on first issue and should not be confused with amounts paid by one shareholder to another to transfer ownership of shares between them. A shareholder is thus afforded limited liability.

=== Brazil ===
In Brazil, a limited company is registered as any other type of company. To register it, you must pay an accountant to research the name of your future business to check if it was not already registered. Then the accountant contacts the offices responsible for giving you the CNPJ (the national code for company identification), which are the commercial joint of the state and the IRS. After that, the Ltda. or Lda. (rarely used) suffixes can be placed after the company's name or with Cia. (abbreviation for companhia, company in Portuguese): [company name] & Cia. Ltda.

=== Canada ===
In Canada, a person wishing to register a limited company must file Articles of Incorporation with either their provincial government or the federal government. At the time of incorporation, a company must elect to use "Limited" (Ltd.), "Incorporated" (Inc.) or "Corporation" (Corp.) as part of their name.

=== India ===
In India, there are three types of limited company: a public limited company, a private limited company, and a one-person company. A company's liability may be limited by shares, in which case the liability of the company's members is limited to the amount of the shares held by them, or it may be limited by guarantee, in which case the liability is limited to a predetermined amount the company's members have agreed to contribute if the company is dissolved with outstanding liabilities. A private limited company is a limited company incorporated under the Companies Act 2013 (or one of its predecessor acts) with a minimum paid-up share capital (if any) of ₹1 lakh (US$1,100), with an article that restricts the transfer of its shares; it may have between two and two hundred members, and its name ends with "Private Limited" (abbreviated Pvt Ltd). A public limited company must have a paid-up share capital of at least ₹5 lakh (US$5,300), and at least seven members; its name ends "Limited" (abbreviated Ltd). A one-person company (OPC) is a private company with similar proprietorship and privileges to a private limited company, but with fewer requirements; this type of company may have only one director and member.

Before 2015, the business organisations that wanted to take up a company as the preferred form of business organisation had to fulfill the requirement of minimum paid-up share capital of not less than 5 lakhs in case of public company and 1 lakh in case of private companies by way of Section 2(71) and 2(68) respectively. However, after in the recent Companies Amendment Act 2015, this requirement is scrapped, and a company can go ahead with its incorporation without fulfilling this criterion.

=== Nigeria ===
In Nigeria, there are two types of limited companies namely: a company limited by guarantee and a company limited by shares. The company limited by shares is further divided into two namely a Private limited company (Ltd.) and a Public limited company (Plc.) In Nigeria shareholders of limited companies are only liable for the amount of money they contributed to the company. All Nigerian companies are governed by the Companies and Allied Matters Act (CAMA) 1990 and regulated by the Corporate Affairs Commission (CAC).

=== South Africa ===
In South Africa, the term "Proprietary Limited", abbreviated "(Pty) Ltd", is used to refer to a private limited company. All South African companies are regulated by the CIPC (Companies and Intellectual Property Commission).

=== Sri Lanka ===
In Sri Lanka, businesses can be registered as Private Limited Company "(Pvt) Ltd", Public Limited Company "PLC" or under a sole proprietorship. Registering as Private Limited Company will be more secure, and have added benefits. Therefore, you and your company will act as two independent parties; ensuring that your business assets and liabilities will be separate. All companies are registered under the Companies Act, No. 7 of 2007., through the Registrar of Companies, which operates its office in Colombo.

=== United Kingdom ===
The registration of companies in the United Kingdom is done through Companies House, which operates offices in London, Cardiff, Edinburgh and Belfast. Most limited companies must end their legal name with either "Limited"/"Ltd." or "public limited company"/"PLC" depending on the type. A company with a welsh registered address may use the welsh language equivalents of "cyfyngedig"/"cyf" for a private or "cwmni cyfyngedig cyhoeddus"/"ccc" for a publicly traded company. All companies can trade under a different business name.

Prior to 1 October 2009, the registration of companies in Northern Ireland was the responsibility of the Department of Enterprise, Trade and Investment (a department of the devolved government). With the enactment of the Companies Act 2006, Northern Ireland's previously distinct company law was repealed and the new companies code instituted by that Act was extended to Northern Ireland.

=== United States ===
In the United States, corporations have limited liability, and the expression corporation is preferred to limited company. A "limited liability company" (LLC) is a different entity. However, some states permit corporations to have the designation Ltd. (instead of the usual Inc.) to signify their corporate status.

=== Zimbabwe ===
In Zimbabwe the term "(Pvt) Ltd" refers to a private company limited by share capital. All private entities are regulated by the Registrar of Companies in Harare.

== See also ==
- Company formation (UK)
- Limited liability partnership (LLP)
- Share capital
- Types of business entity
- Unlimited company
- Yūgen gaisha
- Privately held company
- Incorporation (business)
