= Den Norske Skofabrik =

Former Norwegian shoe factory

- Company type: Aksjeselskap
- Industry: Footwear
- Founded: 1897
- Defunct: 1959
- Fate: Closed
- Headquarters: Oslo, Norway
- Products: Shoes (Standard brand)

Den Norske Skofabrik (Norwegian for "The Norwegian Shoe Factory") was a Norwegian shoe factory that for a period was the country's largest, marketing its products under the "Standard" trademark. It was established as a joint-stock company in Oslo in 1897 and adopted the Standard brand in 1903. By 1905 it had grown into the country's largest shoe factory, with an annual production of 270,000 pairs, and over its first half-century, from 1897 to 1947, it produced around 12.5 million pairs of shoes.

The factory produced all types of shoes and boots, mainly for the home market but with ski boots exported to the United States and Canada. After running into financial trouble in the mid-1950s, operations halted in 1958, and despite loan guarantees from the municipality and the state intended to restart production in 1959, the business was closed that year, with a legal aftermath in 1961 when creditors demanded the loans repaid.

== Bibliography ==
- Dalseg, Trygve (ed.) (1947). Skoen som går og årene som gikk: Den norske skofabrik gjennom femti år 1897–1947. Den Norske Skofabrik.
