= W. Baelz & Sohn =

W. Baelz & Sohn, GmbH & Co.
- Company type: GmbH & Co. KG
- Founded: 1896
- Headquarters: Heilbronn, Germany
- Key people: Andrea Bälz; Florian Bälz
- Website: www.baelz.de www.baelzna.com

W. Baelz & Sohn GmbH & Co. is a company based in Heilbronn, Germany that builds and installs steam and hot-water installations. Subsidiaries are located in other large towns in Germany, as well as in Vienna, Paris, and Beijing.

== History ==
W. Baelz was founded in Düren by Wilhelm Bälz in 1896, and the family retains control of the company. Before establishing the company, Wilhelm Bälz had manually produced products of copper for domestic and industrial needs in the workshop of a retail store. He founded the company W. Baelz in Düren. Wilhelm Bälz moved to Heilbronn in 1914 with his part of the company.

In the first decades, the company specialized in planning and constructing steam installations for the manufacturing industry. As a result, in addition to copper, production of iron and steel was added. Due to the aftermath of World War II, Wilhelm Bälz was obliged to abandon almost all of these lines of business. During the air attack on Heilbronn on December 4, 1944, the company buildings on the Koepffstrasse were totally destroyed.

After the end of World War II, business was slowly restarted and the destroyed buildings were gradually raised again. With the aid of Wilhelm's son, Helmut Bälz, the company developed heat exchangers and electrically and pneumatically operated valves mainly for steam and thermal oil applications, developing the closed steam/condensate circuit. Among other products and technologies, the vertical heat exchanger in combination with the closed steam/condensate circuit was conceived by Helmut Bälz and patented.

In the early 1960s, the ejector with a controllable nozzle and actuator was developed and introduced in HVAC plants. Baelz has continued to file numerous patents on elements of ejector technology and on their specific applications in installations. In the 1970s, Baelz received several commendations from the government of the German state Baden-Württemberg for ejector technology as a product of special economic value. In 1978, the Baelz Foundation was established in order to sponsor engineering education at universities in Germany in the field of practical control engineering, especially of building technology.

== Publications ==
- Renate Kilpper: Geregelte Strahlpumpen in der Gebäudetechnik, Moderne Gebäudetechnik, Berlin 2010, S. 26–28.
- Uwe Bälz: Energieeffizientes Heizen für individuellen Heizkomfort, Erneuerbare Energie, Gleisdorf 2009, S. 10.
- Marc Gebauer: Hydrodynamische Wasser-Wärme-Verteilung mit sechs Regelkreisen und nur eine Umwälzpumpe, Heizung Lüftung Klimatechnik, 2007, S. 6–7.
- Marc Gebauer: Geregelte Strahlpumpen in der Haustechnik, Heizung Lüftung Klimatechnik, 2006.
- Marc Gebauer: Einsparungspotential durch Regelungstechnik, EuroHeat&Power, Brüssel 2004.
- Hans Hesselbacher: Umwälzpumpe ade, Chemie Technik, 2000, S. 188–189.
- Hans Hesselbacher: Die Wirtschaftlichkeit von Strahlpumpen in Heizungsanlagen, Haustechnische Rundschau, 1976.
