= Szaloncukor =

Candies used to decorate Christmas trees in Hungary

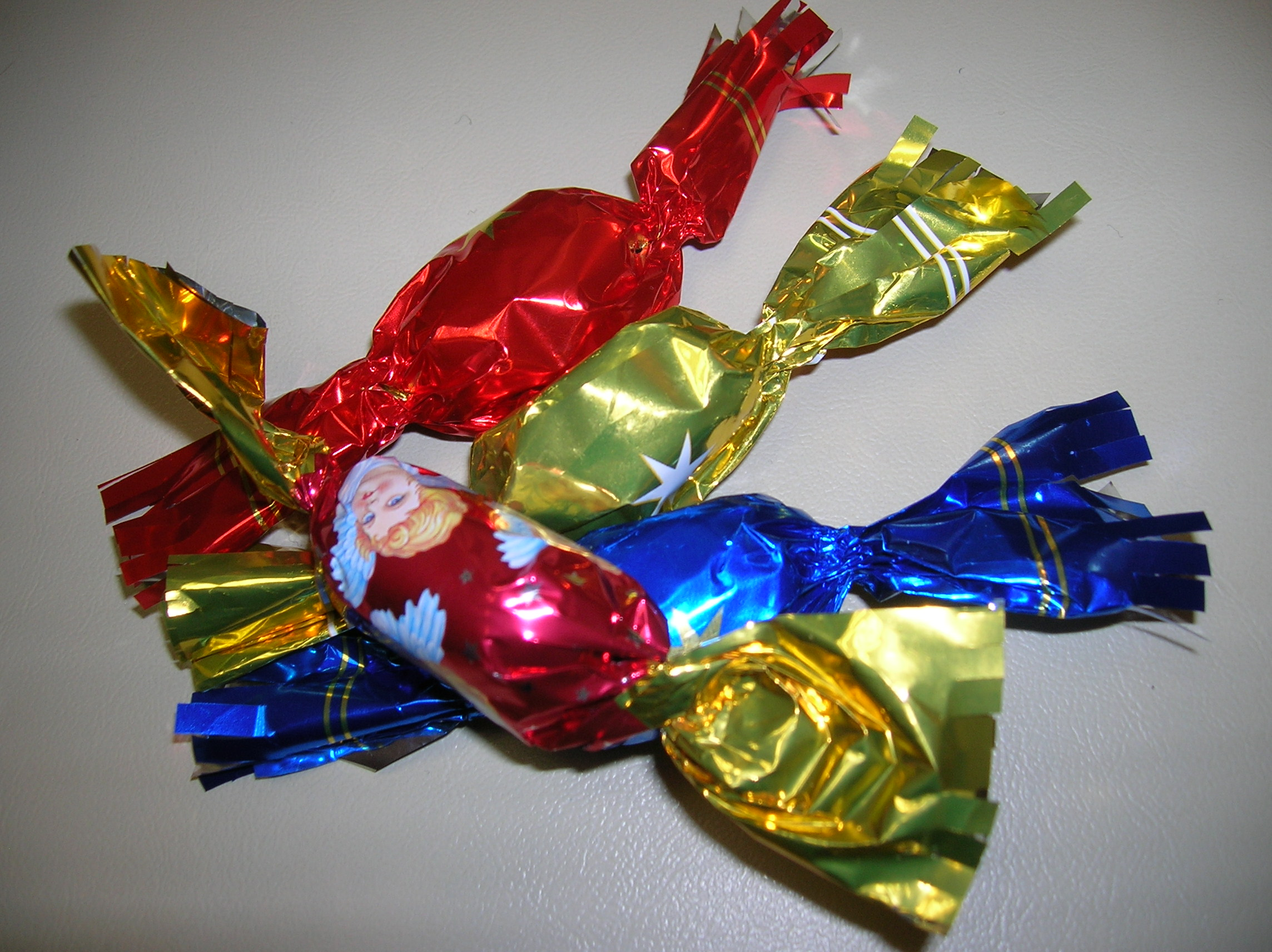
- Type: Confectionery
- Place of origin: Hungary
- Main ingredients: filling such as jelly, marzipan, coconut covered in chocolate

Szaloncukor (Hungarian: [ˈsɒlont͡sukor]; Slovak: salónka, plural salónky; literally: "parlour candy", Romanian: bomboane de pom) is a type of sweet traditionally associated with Christmas in Hungary, Romania and Slovakia. It is a typical imported and adapted Hungarikum. It is usually made of fondant, covered by chocolate and wrapped in shiny coloured foil, then hung on the Christmas tree as decoration.

Every year, almost a kilo and a half of it are consumed per household during Christmas season.

The tradition of hanging these candies on the Christmas tree started in the 19th century. It was named szaloncukor because the tree usually stood in the parlour (szalon in Hungarian; Cukor means "sugar" or "candy"; in Slovak salón is "parlour" and -ka is diminutive suffix).

The name comes from the German-Austrian Salonzuckerl; this is why the original name was szalonczukkedli.

== Manufacturing ==
The whole procedure was manual until the first fondant-machines appeared. These were made by Stühmer chocolate factory for the famous sweet-shop, Gerbaud. The last part of the procedure to be mechanized was the thrumming of the end of the paper cover. Considering that it has such a typical shape to keep, this part was not to be omitted.

Fondant candies originally came in a few flavours (vanilla and strawberry for example), but now there is a variety of candies, including jelly, coconut, hazelnut and many other flavors. It is usually hung on the tree with strings or small metal hooks. It is considered traditional on children's part, no matter how adults may frown, to empty all the wrappers on the tree before the season is out.

== History ==
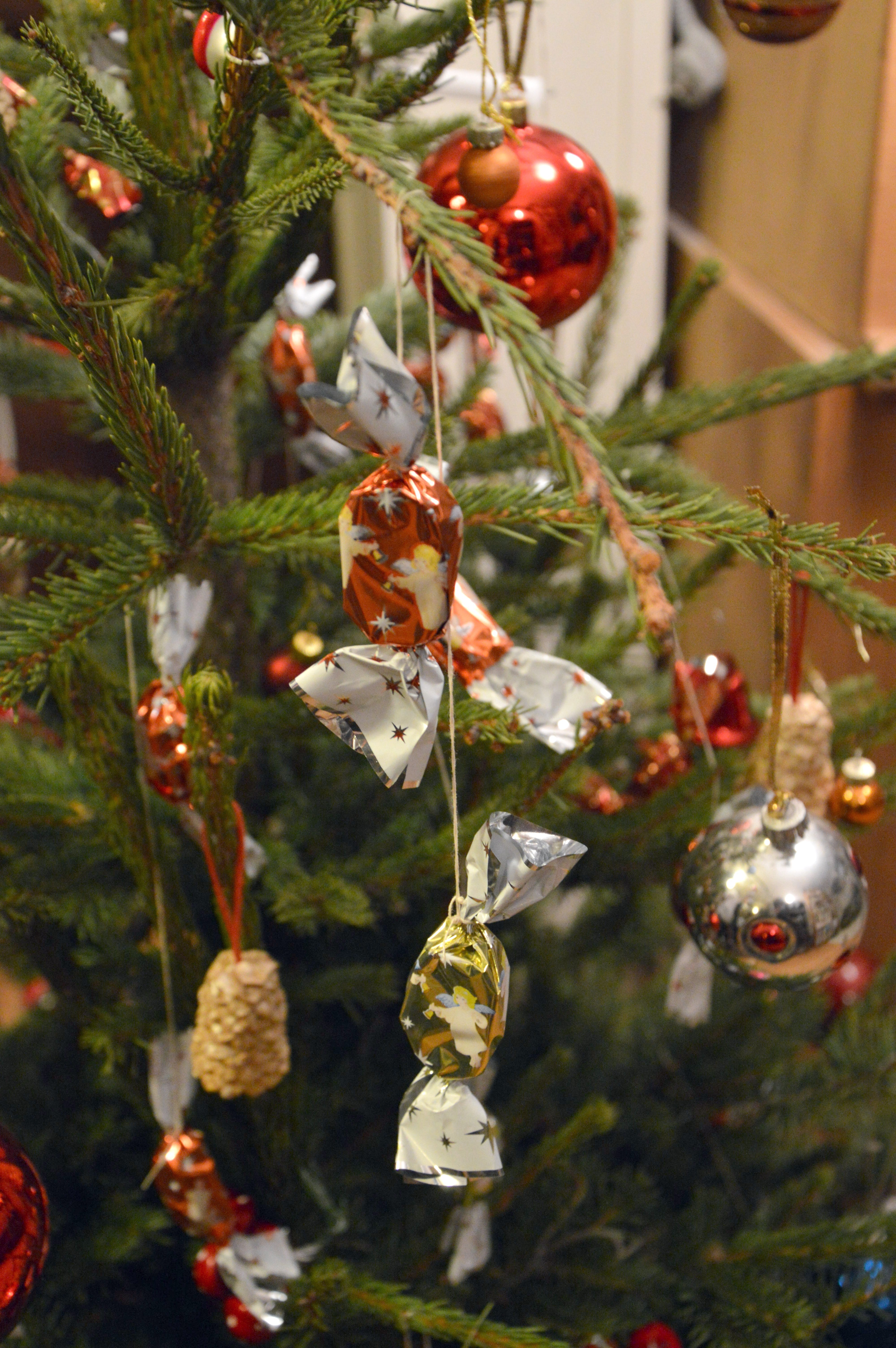
Christmas tree decorated with the candy

The earliest version of this fondant dessert emerged during the 14th century in France and was called fondantcukor. The recipe was altered through the years of European confectionery history. French pastry chef Pierre-Andre Manion in the 17th century introduced fondantcukor recipe in Germany.

The popularity of the fondant candies reached Hungary when German craftsmen migrated there in the 19th century. German wealthy families would erect Christmas trees in the entrance halls of their homes (called salons) and decorate them with sweets wrapped in shiny paper.

Such candies were made first in the 14th century in France. By the beginning of the 19th century it came through German intermediates to Hungary. In 1891, Hungarian-French chef and entrepreneur Hegyesi Joseph coined the name Szaloncukor which is derived from German fondant candy called "Salonzuckerl" which means "Sugar in Salons".

The mass production of fondant candies wrapped in foil packaging was manufactured by steam-powered engines in 1883 in Hungary, mostly dedicated for creating traditional cakes of the Gerbeaud brand.

Following Gerbeaud as inspiration, the family of Geza Kugler founded a chocolate factory in 1886. The Gerbeauds and Kuglers each adopted their own version of the recipe and published 19th-century recipe books of Hungarian confectionery. By the end of the 1800s, the candies were packed in tinfoil balls and colored tissue papers.

In 1941, the Kuglers opened the largest chocolate factory in Hungary.

In 1951 chocolate factory DEVA was founded in Trebišov, Czechoslovakia (today Slovakia), which has been producing one of the best known chocolate Christmas candy in Slovakia, including "parlour candy" (salónky). Today, DEVA is brand owned by company ChocoSuc Partner s.r.o.

== See also ==
- Christmas trees
