= Brødrene Halléns hanskefabrikk =

Former Norwegian glove manufacturer

- Company type: Aksjeselskap
- Industry: Glove manufacturing
- Founded: 1890
- Defunct: 1980
- Fate: Glove production ended; shop continued
- Headquarters: Oslo, Norway
- Key people: Ludvig Hallén; Wilhelm Hallén
- Products: Gloves (Nellah brand)

Brødrene Halléns hanskefabrikk (Norwegian for "The Hallén Brothers' Glove Factory") was an industrial company in Oslo that produced and sold gloves under the Nellah trademark, "Hallén" spelled backward.

== History ==
A tannery and glove-making business was founded in 1822 by Jens Christian Hallén. His son Christian took over in 1862, and before his death in 1888 the third generation, the brothers Ludvig and Wilhelm Hallén, were taken on as partners. The brothers expanded the business into the country's largest glove factory and specialty shop, putting the Nellah trademark on everything from coarse work gloves to fine walking gloves, and established glove shops under the Nellah name in several cities along with several branches in Oslo.

The factory in Christian Michelsens gate was closed in the late 1970s, and the buildings, near Lilleborg Church, still stand, converted into apartments. The glove shop on the corner of Øvre Slottsgate and Karl Johan was closed in 1989, but its interior was preserved at the wish of the city's heritage authority, while the branch on the corner of Stortingsgata and Roald Amundsens gate, opened in 1936, was carried on by the sixth generation, under Annette Hallén.
