= Skindergade 19 =

Neoclassical building in Copenhagen, Denmark

- Skindergade 19
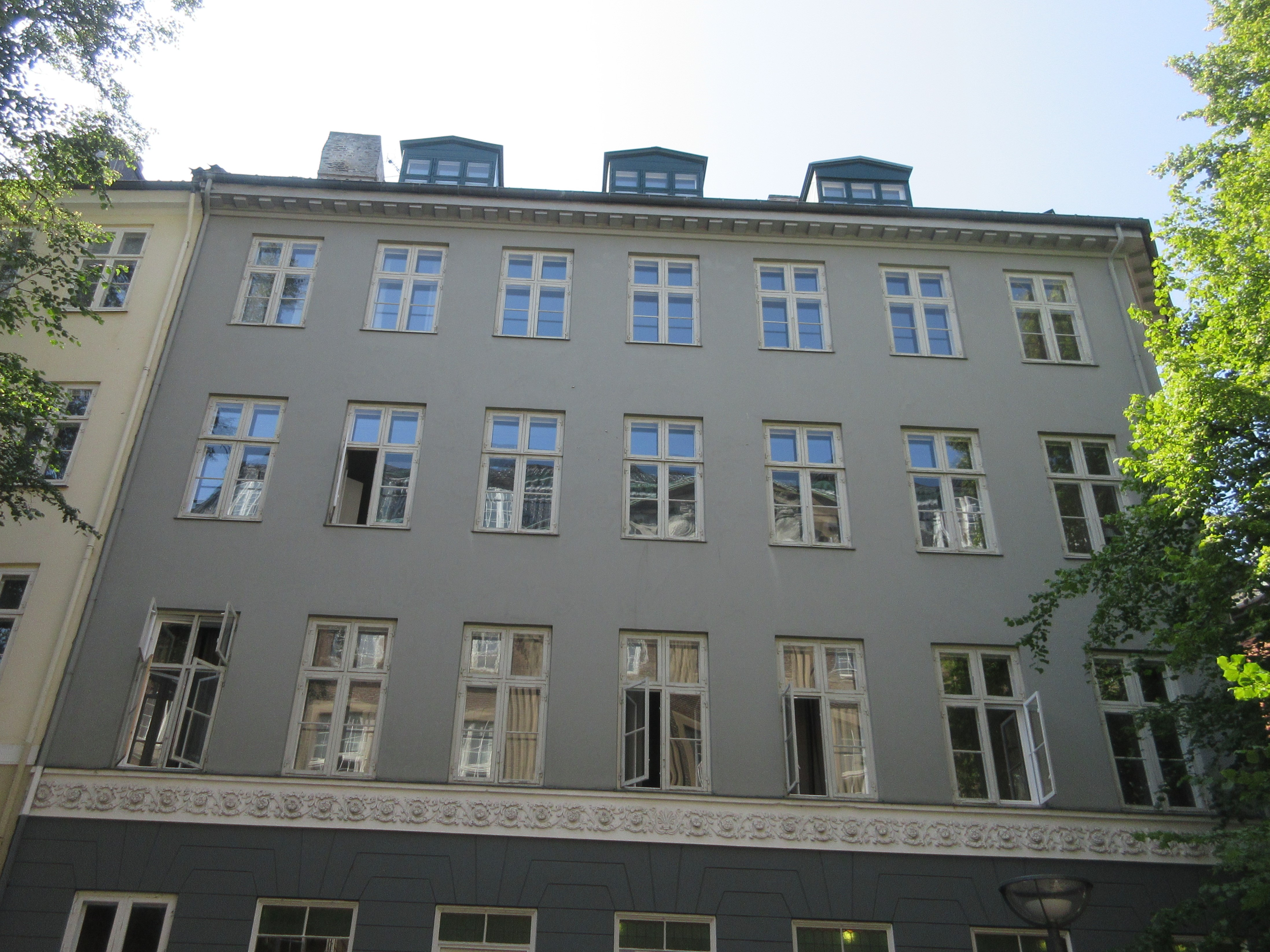
- Interactive map of the Skindergade 19 area

General information
- Location: Copenhagen, Denmark
- Coordinates: 55°40′48″N 12°34′30.43″E
- Completed: 1829

Skindergade 19 is a Neoclassical building situated on the corner of Skindergade and Kejsergade in the Old Town of Copenhagen, Denmark. The building was listed in the Danish registry of protected buildings and places in 1945. Notable former residents include the military officer Christian de Meza, composer Niels W. Gade, naval officer Edouard Suenson, ballet master August Bournonville and ballet dancer Juliette Price.

== History ==
=== Site history, 1689–1825 ===
The site was formerly part of four different properties. The small corner property was listed in Copenhagen's first cadastre of 1689 as No. 82 in Frimand's Quarter and belonged to joiner Thomas Barfoed at that time. The adjacent property in Skindergade was listed as No. 71 and belonged to tailor Johann Wilken Bürckner. The adjacent property in Kejsergade was listed as No. 124 and belonged to tanner (remsnider) Jørgen Hansen.

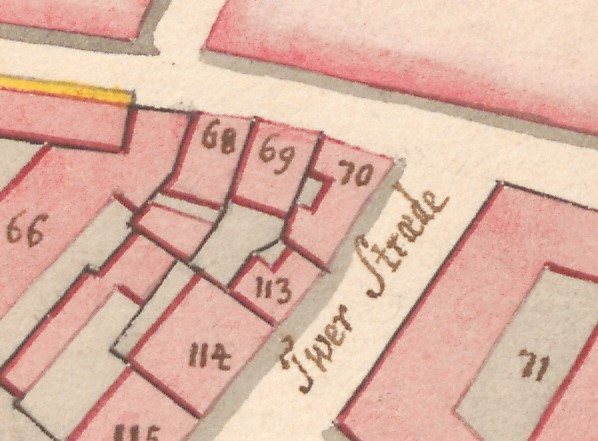
No. 70. No. 69 and No. 113 seen on a detail from Christian Gedde's map of Frimand's Quarter.

The corner building (old No. 82) was listed in the new cadastre of 1756 as No. 70 and belonged to carpenter Augustinus Pedersen Vivel at that time. The adjacent property in Skindergade (old No. 81) was listed as No. 69 and belonged to one Peder Ohlsen. The adjacent property in Kejsergade (old No. 124) was listed as No. 113 and belonged to one Samuel Kruus.

The corner property (old No. 82/70) was listed in the new cadastre of 1806 as No. 95 and belonged to carpenter Henrik Brede. The adjacent property in Skindergade (old No. 81/69) was listed as No. 40 and belonged to Madsen Kjær. The adjacent property in Kejsergade (old No. 124/113) was listed as No. 96 and belonged to one captain Wendel's widow.

=== Johan Jørgen Bruun and his building ===
In 1825, No. 95 was merged wit No. 96, No. 40 and part of No. 39 (No. 39 B). The present building on the site was constructed for krigsråd Johan Jørgen Bruun in 1828–29. Johan Jørgen Bruun (26 February 1802 – 31 January 1868) was a high-ranking civil servant, who had started his career in the General Staff's Office back in 1810. He was appointed as krigsråd in 1823, senior clerk (fuldmægtig) in 1831, justitsråd in 1832, principal administrator (ekspeditionssekretær) in 1835 and finally office manager (kontorchef) with title of etatsrådin 1838. He was created a Knight of the Order of the Dannebrog in 1836.

Bruun was married to Johanne Margrethe Brünniche (1792–i860), daughter of the painter Peter Brünniche (1739-1814) and Inger Caroline Egerod.

Bruun's property was home to 28 residents at the time of the 1840 census. Johan Jørgen Braun resided on the second floor with his wife Hanne Margrethe Braun, their 28-year-old son Frants Christopher Braun, their 20-year-old daughter Carl Christian Leopold Gether, a senior clerk and Class-Lottery collector, resided on the ground floor with his wifeDinentine Charlotte ElisabethWillasen, their two children (aged two and five) and two maids. Niels Larsen, a shop manager, resided in the basement with one servant and one lodger. Peder Jacobsen, a workman, resided in the basement with his wife Ane Maria Olsen, their one-year-old daughter, a lodger and two male servants. Ernst Fredrik Bojesen, a teacher in Borgerdyd School, resided on the third floor with his wife Frederikke Brenøe, their three children (aged three to seven), the 13-year-old lodger Adam Louzau (son of a chamberlain) and one maid.

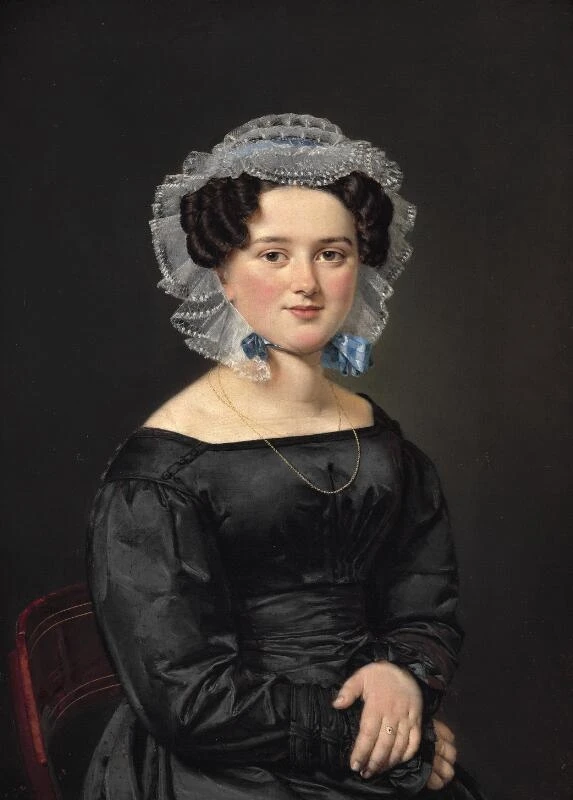
Antonie Wilhelmine Wilder painted by C. A. Jensen, 1828

Johan Jürgen Braun resided on the second floor until at least 1860. Carl Christian Leopold Gether was also resident in the ground floor apartment until at least 1850. The military officer Christian de Meza resided in the third floor apartment from 1841 to 1850. Antonie Wilhelmine Wilder (1801-1856), widow of commercial agent Hans Wilder (1779-1839) operated a private school in her home on the first floor from the first half of the 1840s until after 1850. She lived there with her two children (aged 11 and 15), a 34-year-old female teacher, a 25-year-old lodger (student) and one maid at the time of the 1845 census.

Peder Pedersen Basnæs, a barkeeper, was a new tenant in the basement at the time of the 1840 census. He lived there with his wife Ingeborg Pedersen Basnæs, their two children (aged 12 and 15) and four lodgers.

=== Later history ===
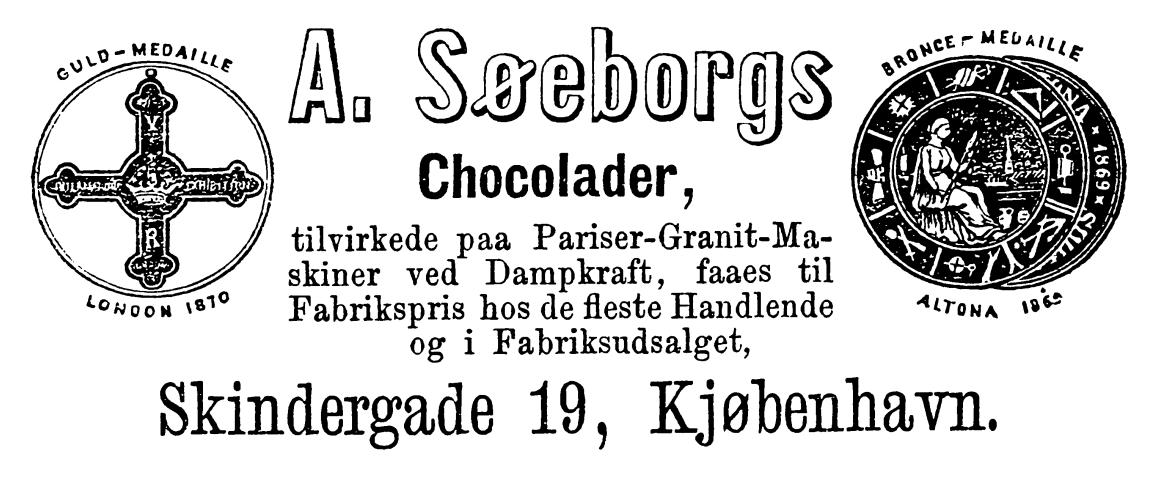
Advert for A. Søeborg's Fabrikker at Skindergade 19, 1872.

The composer Niels W. Gade was a resident in the building from 1861 to 1863. He was a professor at the music academy and also worked as organist at Holmen Church. The naval officer Edouard Suenson was a resident in the building in 1864.

A. Søeborg's Fabrikker operated a chocolate shop in the building in 1872.

The retired ballet dancer and choreographer August Bournonville resided in the third floor apartment in 1877. Juliette Price, Bournonville's favourite dancer, was a resident of the building in 1776–99.

== Architecture ==
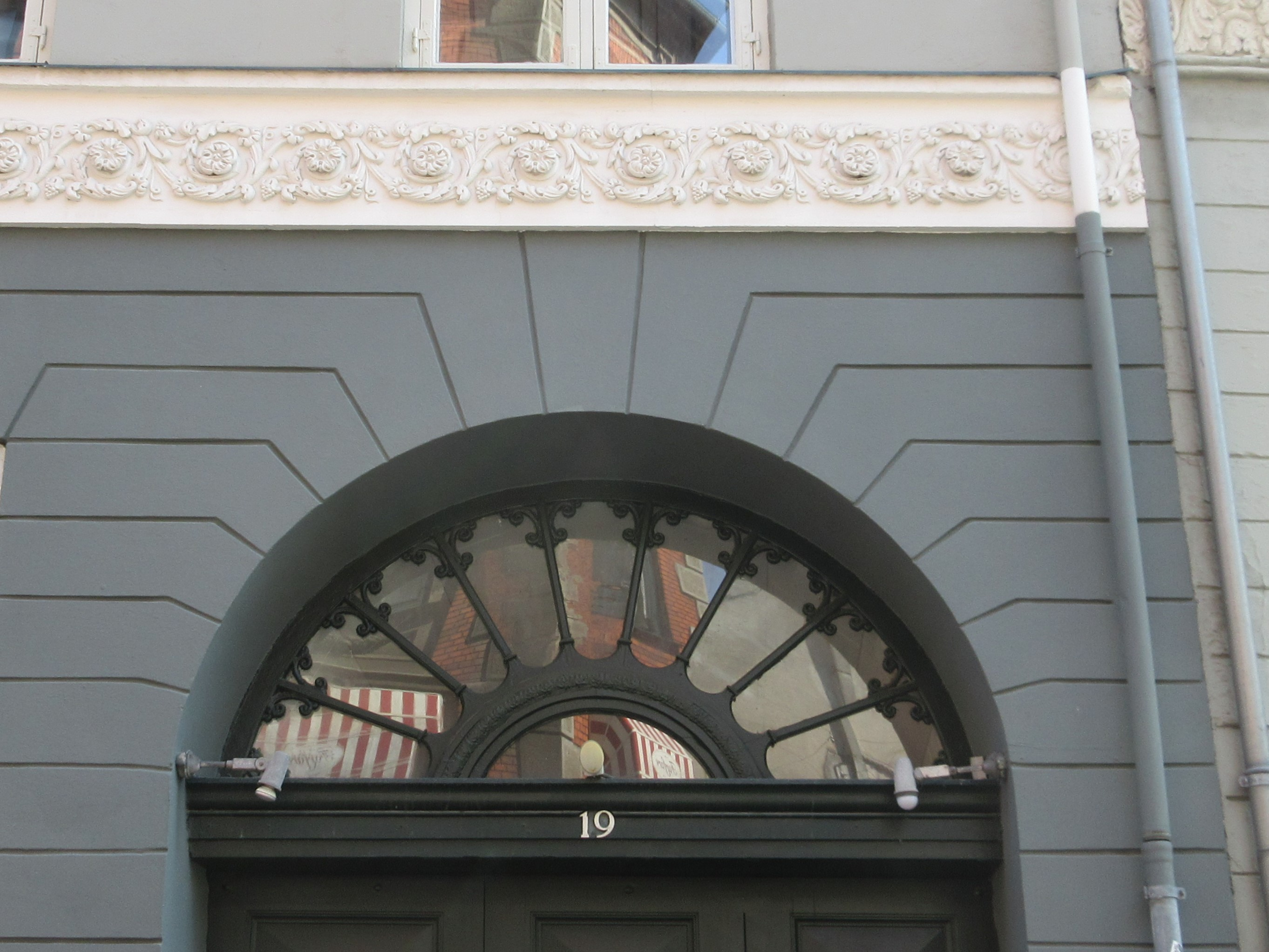
The fanlight above the gate.

Skindergade 19 is an acute-angled corner building constructed with four storeys over a walk-out basement, with a six-bay-long façade towards Skindergade, a seven-bay-long façade towards Kejsergade and a chamfered corner. The rendered façade which is finished with shadow joints on its lower part, features a frieze below the first floor windows and a modillioned cornice below the roof. A green-painted gate topped by a fanlight is located in the bay furthest to the right in Skindergade.

== Today ==
The property is owned by E/F Skindergade 19. It contains a shop on the ground floor and a single condominium on each of the upper floors.

== Gallery ==
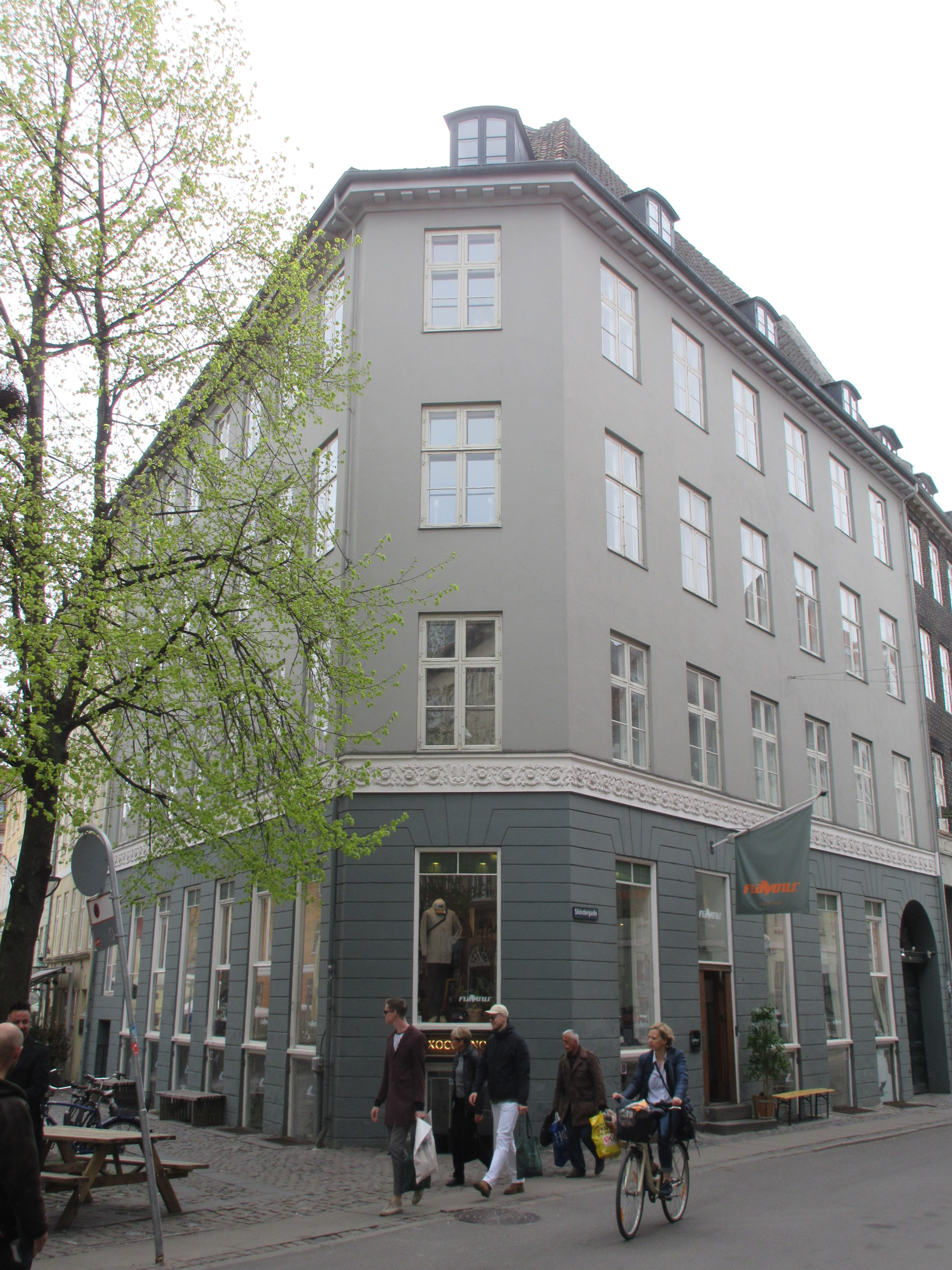
The chamfered corner.

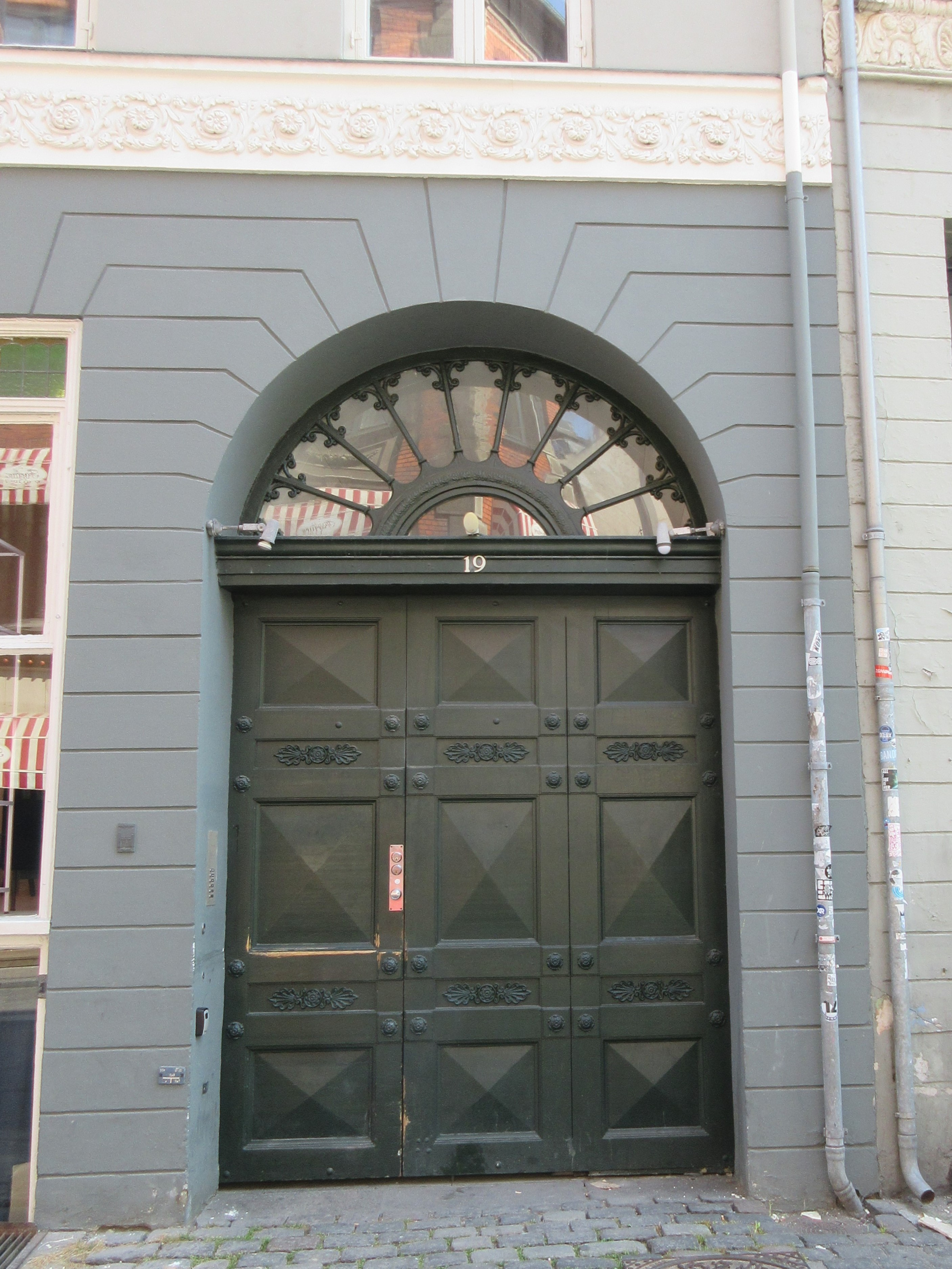
The gate in Skindergade.
