= K/S =

K/S can refer to:

- Kommanditselskab, the Danish equivalent of Limited partnership
- Kirk/Spock, a pair in slash fiction
