= Kehlet =

Kehlet is a surname. Notable people with the surname include:

- Christian F. Kehlet (1785–1846), founder of the eponymous chocolate company
- Jakob Kehlet (born 1980), Danish professional football referee
