= Bergen Blikktrykkeri =

Former Norwegian tin-printing and packaging company

- Company type: Aksjeselskap
- Industry: Packaging
- Founded: 1908
- Founder: Paul Scholz
- Defunct: 1965
- Fate: Merged into Noblikk-Sannem
- Headquarters: Bergen, Norway
- Products: Tin packaging, can labels

Bergen Blikktrykkeri was a company in Bergen, founded in 1908 by the German-born industrialist Paul Scholz. It made packaging for the canning industry and had a paper-printing works that produced labels for the cans, as well as a mechanical workshop that built its production machines. The business grew quickly on the boom in the canning industry and became one of Bergen's largest and most modern companies after moving into a new factory building on Damsgårdsveien in 1913.

In 1959 Bergen Blikktrykkeri merged with three companies from eastern Norway to form Noblikk, and in 1965 Noblikk merged with J.A. Sannem AS to become Noblikk-Sannem AS, with production moving from Damsgårdsveien to Fjøsangerveien. All tin production in Bergen was closed in 1989, and operations were consolidated in Moss. The brick facade of the original factory survives, now housing a shop, kindergarten, and apartments.
