= Automobilfabriken Aamodt & Fiske =

Former Norwegian vehicle-body manufacturer

- Formerly: Automobilfabrikken; Automobilfabrikken Fiske
- Company type: Aksjeselskap
- Industry: Automotive
- Founded: 1923
- Founder: Ivar Fiske
- Defunct: 1972
- Fate: Closed
- Headquarters: Oslo, Norway
- Products: Vehicle bodies, hydraulic tippers, tankers

Automobilfabriken Aamodt & Fiske was a company in Oslo that produced vehicle bodies, hydraulic tippers, tankers, and other equipment. It was founded as Automobilfabrikken in 1923 by the engineer Ivar Fiske and was closed in 1972.

The company built vehicle bodies for trucks and vans as well as hydraulic tippers and tankers. Fiske developed a hydraulic tipping mechanism for trucks, the Fiske tipper, which sold well, and the factory also received large orders for tankers from customers such as BP. The engineer Arthur Aamodt joined the firm in 1928, and in 1939 the name was changed from Automobilfabrikken to Automobilfabrikken Aamodt & Fiske.

After Aamodt's death in 1954, Ivar Fiske became sole owner, later joined by his son Svein Fiske. On the founder's death in 1967 the company was renamed Automobilfabrikken Fiske A/S. As competition in the tanker market grew and margins shrank, Svein Fiske ran the firm until it was closed in 1972.
