= Alfred Andersen mek. Verksted & Støberi =

Former Norwegian mechanical workshop and foundry

- Formerly: NLI Alfr. Andersen; NLI Larvik
- Type: Aksjeselskap
- Industry: Mechanical engineering, foundry
- Founded: 1893
- Defunct: 2016
- Fate: Bankruptcy; production closed
- Headquarters: Torstrand, Larvik, Norway
- Key people: Alfred Andersen
- Products: Agricultural machinery, whaling equipment, steel structures, bridges, offshore equipment

Alfred Andersen mek. Verksted & Støberi (Norwegian for "Alfred Andersen Mechanical Workshop & Foundry") was an industrial company at Torstrand in Larvik. Founded in 1893, it grew into a large workshop in Vestfold with the whole country as its market, and its products were adapted to the largest markets of the day, from the needs of whaling to the oil industry and the building trade.

== History ==
The founder Alfred Andersen (1851–1923) apprenticed with his father, who was a smith at Torstrand in Larvik. After working as a machinist in the United States and as a ship's smith at Hølen shipyard, among other things, he started his own smithy business on a site he bought at Østre Halsen in 1893. The business expanded quickly, and in 1902 Andersen bought a larger site from Treschow-Fritzøe at Torstrandmoen and built a new factory there. In this early period the main production was various agricultural machines, plows, harrows, spades, and so on, but the manufacture of agricultural machinery gradually fell away, particularly in favor of involvement in whaling.

=== Andersen the whaling entrepreneur ===
Alfred Andersen's smithy supplied equipment for catching bottlenose whales. A continuation of this activity, on a far larger scale, was the company's involvement in whaling, which began after the first expedition had set out from Sandefjord in 1905. Andersen was a pioneer in this period, and from 1908 onward he was involved in the formation of all the whaling companies in the town. The company's activity at this time included both the outfitting of factory ships and the supply of materials to the boats, such as harpoons, grenades, and shackles.

In 1909 the company took up production of steel windows. It was also involved in the state's work on the telephone and telegraph network in Norway, and the deliveries to the state led, among other things, to the building of a galvanizing plant. The workshop's largest department was the plate and construction workshop, which supplied bridges, iron masts, radio masts, all kinds of iron structures for buildings, oil and petrol tanks, hangar doors, materials for the electrification of railways, and more.

After the Second World War the company was a leading supplier of bridge structures, and the business was later largely oriented toward offshore activity. In 1978 the company opened a new, large assembly hall at Torstrand, designed by the architects Lund & Slaatto.

=== Change of ownership ===
In 1999 the Andersen family put the company up for sale and attracted several interested parties. The Tønsberg-based NLI Husø won the bid and ran the company on with a continued focus on offshore and subsea solutions. Following deficits and financial problems after 2006, NLI Alfr. Andersen was declared bankrupt in 2012, and the business was carried on under the name NLI Larvik. The company continued to struggle and cut its workforce in several rounds until 2016, when production in Larvik was closed for good and the last 58 employees lost their jobs. The plant at Torstrand was largely left unused and falling into disrepair, with only some parts used for a fitness center, among other things.

== Bibliography ==
- Nord, Einar. Fra smie til Norges utbygger, Alfr. Andersen mek. Verksted & støberi.
- Østby, Ulrik Kornberg (2017). Hvordan påvirket Alfr. Andersen Mek. Verksted & Støberi A/S samfunnet i Larvik i årene 1938 til 1960. Master's thesis in history, University of Oslo.
