= Christian F. Kehlet =

Danish chocolate company

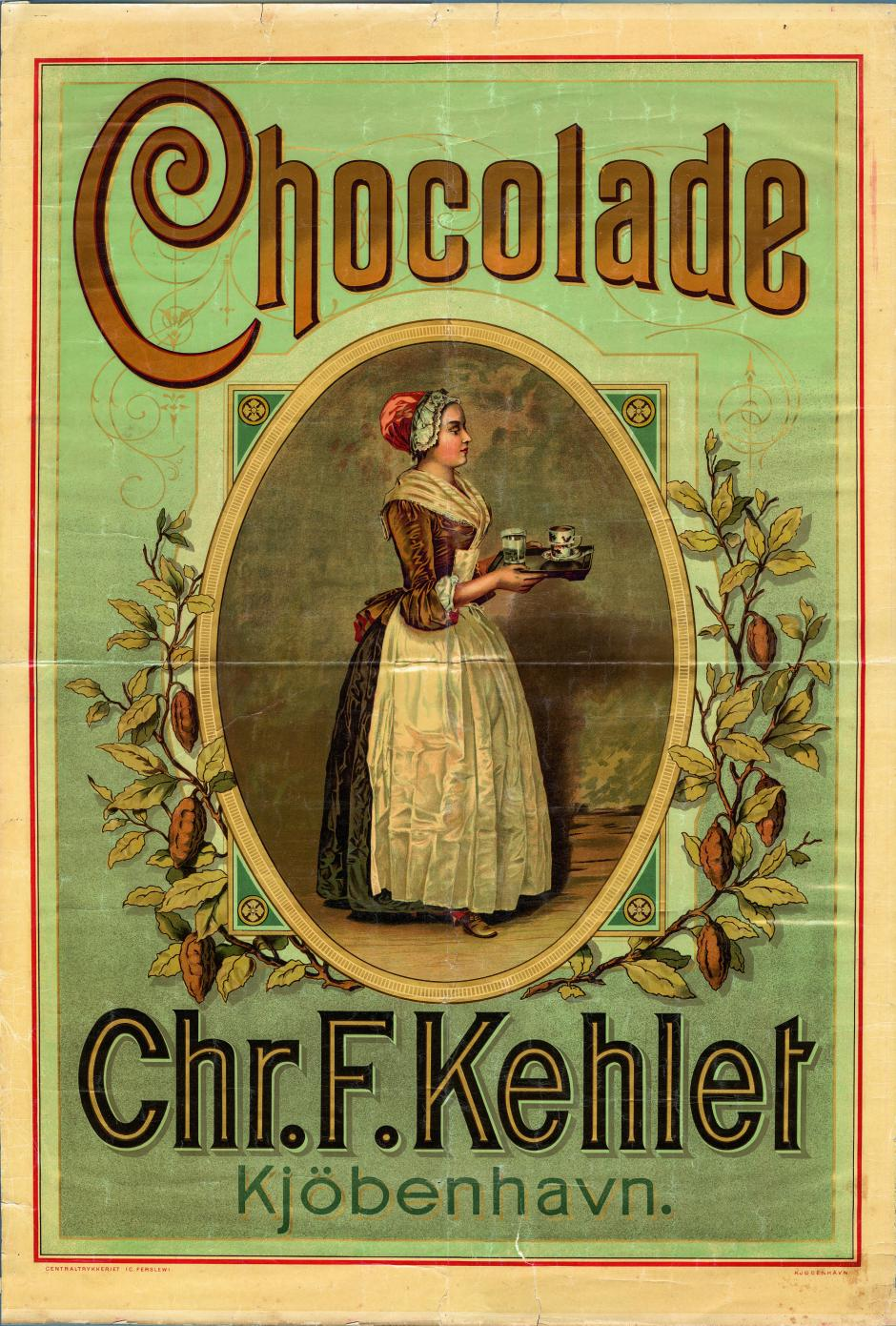
Christian F. Kehlet poster

Christian F. Kehlet was a Danish chocolate company based in Copenhagen, Denmark. The company was from 1873 based at Jagtvej 83–85 in Nørrebro. It was merged with Brødrene Cloëtta in 1929 and the factory on Jagtvej closed the following year.

== History ==
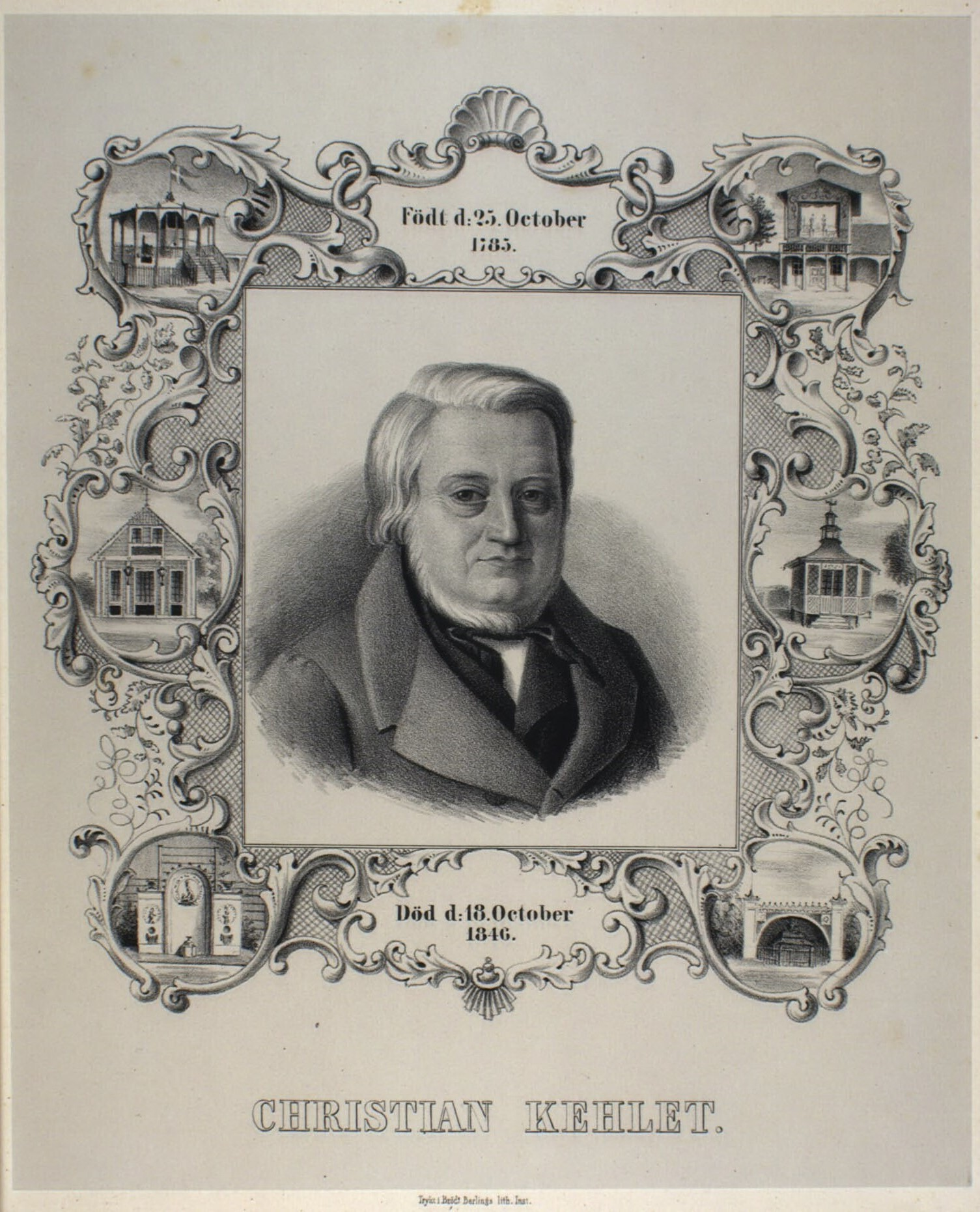
Christian Kehlet

The factory was founded by Christian Kehlet (1785–1846) in 1825. Christian Kehlet was originally a tea and porcelain merchant. His chocolate factory may initially have been located in the groundfloor of Pilestræde 98 (later No. 11 and now replaced by the Illum Department Store) but it was from 1830 based at Østergade 34. The machinery was from the beginning operated by steam engines. The factory was later located at Gothersgade 25.

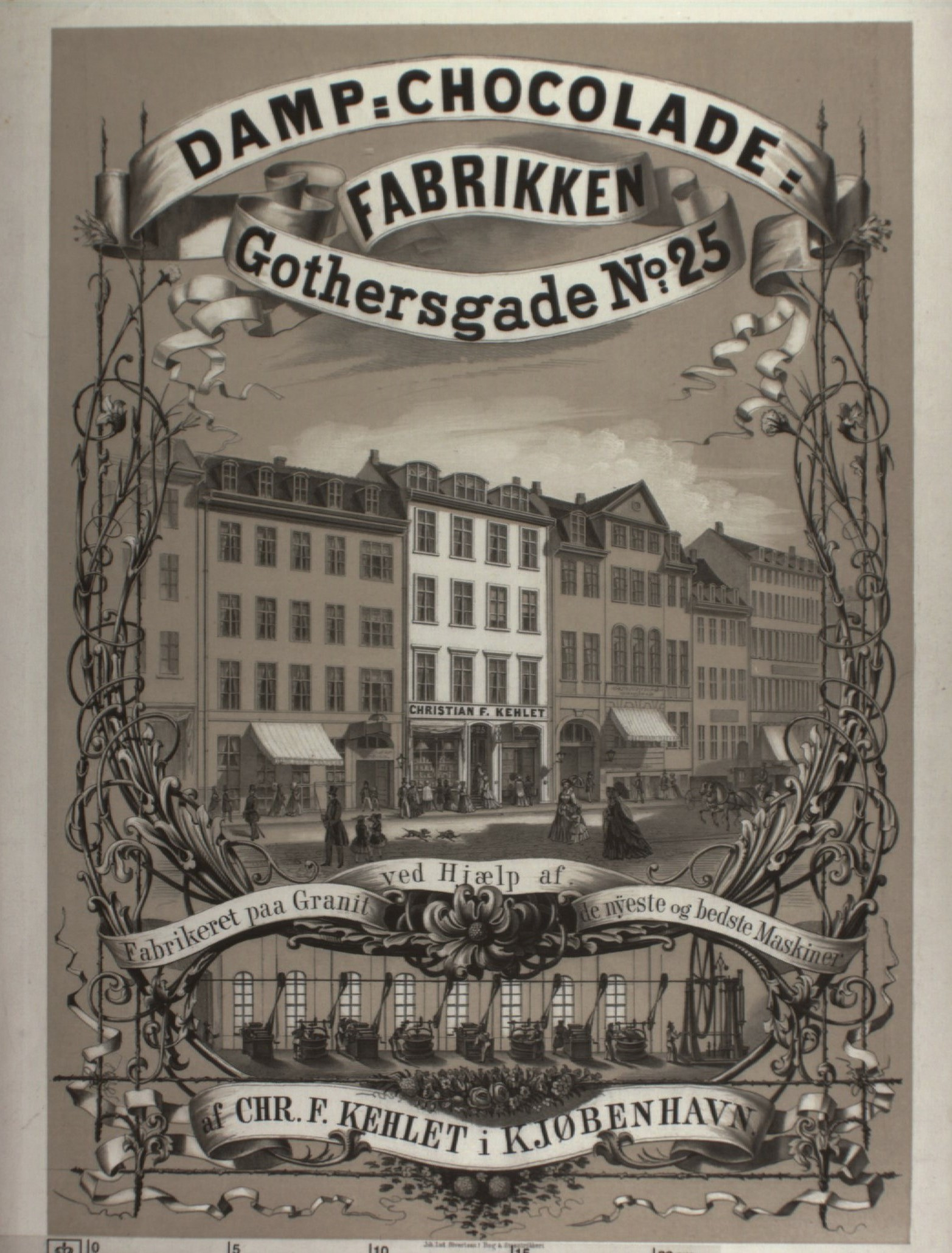
Advert for the "Steam Chocolate Factory Gothersgade 25"

Kehlet opened a salon with live music four nights a week in the Erichsen Mansion on Kongens Nytorv in 1840. He acquired the entertainment venue Alleenberg on Frederiksberg Allé in 1841 and established a large amusement park at the site.

Kehlet's son Christian F. Kehlet (1814–1882) was made a partner in the company in 1844. A new granite rolling mill arrived from Paris in 1845. Christian Kehlet's death the following year left his son as the sole owner of the company.

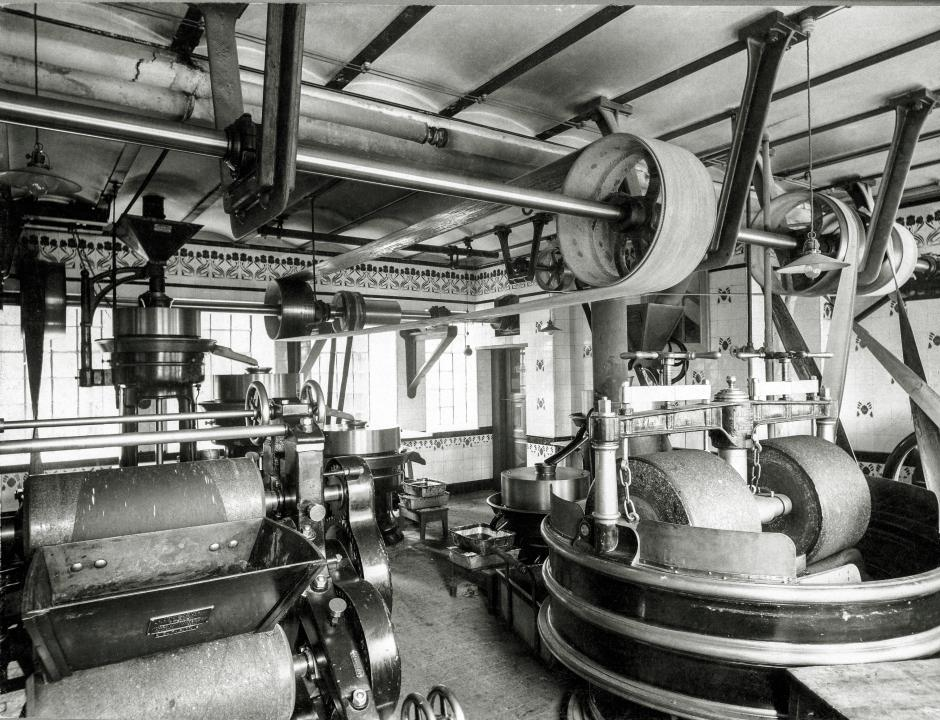
Interior of the Kehlet factory in 1890

The company was after Christian F. Kehlet's death in 1882 continued by his widow. A new factory at Jagtvej 85-87 was inaugurated in 1887. It was in 1888 acquired by H. G. M. Hansen (born 1849). Max Hey was from 1918 managing director of the company.

In 1929, Christian F. Kehlet was converted into a limited company had from then on the same owners as Brødrene Cloëtta. Max Hey was from then on managing director of both companies which were based at Brødrene Cloëtta's headquarters at Hørsholmsgade 20. The factory on Jagtvej closed in 1930.

== Legacy ==
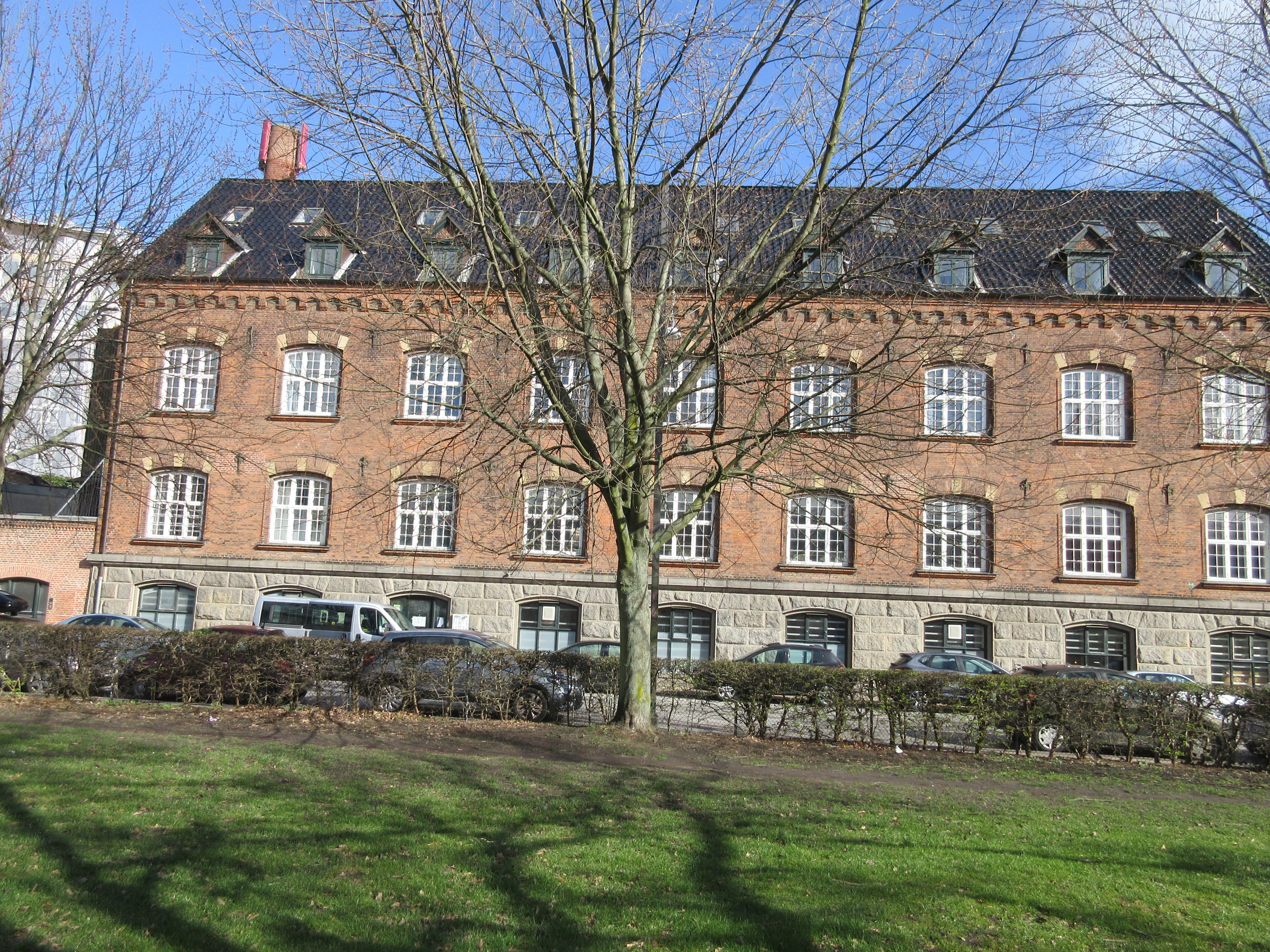
Hørsholmsgade 20 in Copenhagen

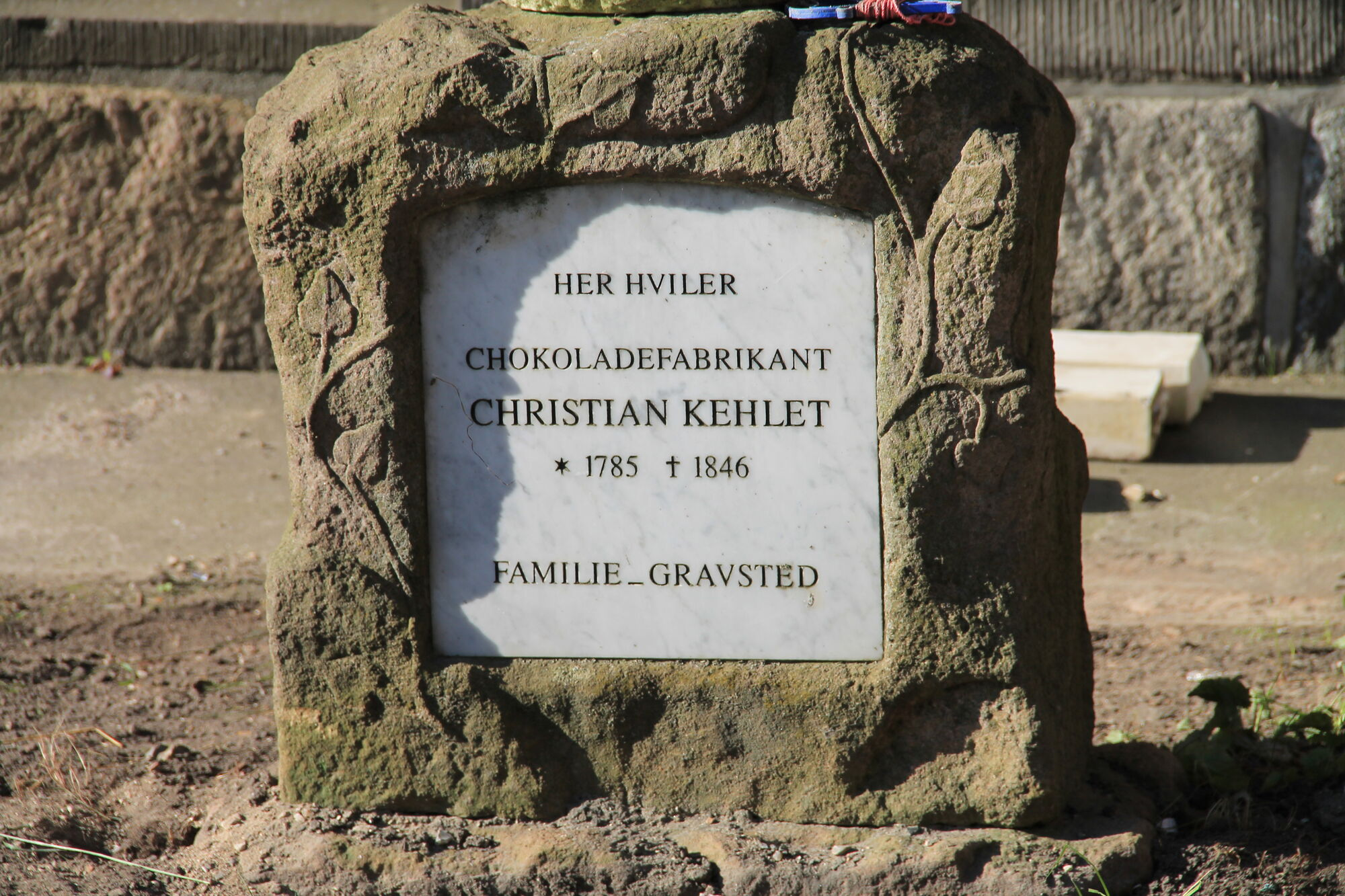
Kejlet's tombstone at Holmen Cemetery.

The Kehlet brand is still produced by now Sweden-based confectionary company Cloetta.

The company's former chocolate factory at Hørsholmsgade has survived.

== See also ==
- A. Søeborg's Fabrikker
