= Christoph Cloëtta =

Swiss-Danish chocolatier

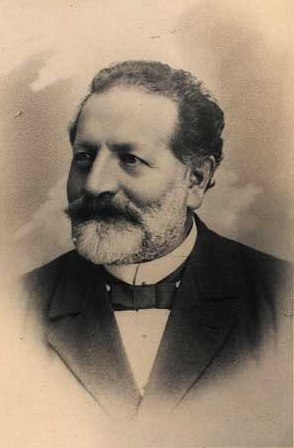
- Born: 24 September 1836; Bergün, Switzerland
- Died: 30 March 1897 (aged 60); Copenhagen, Denmark
- Occupation: Industrialist
- Known for: Chocolate

Christoph Cloëtta (24 September 1836 – 30 March 1897) was a Swiss-born Danish chocolatier and founder of the Brødrene Cloëtta chocolate factory in Copenhagen. Cloëtta was appointed as Swiss consul in 1888.

== Early life and education ==
Cloëtta was born on 24 September 1836 at Bergün in Graubünden, Switzerland, the son of local farmer Nuttin Cloëtta (1803–83) and Jacobea Janett (1810–99). Christoph´s older brother Bernhard moved to Copenhagen in 1848, and was followed by his younger brothers Christoph and Nuttin a few years later. While in Copenhagen the brothers apprenticed as confectioners. They started out by operating various smaller Swiss-style conditoreis.

== Career ==
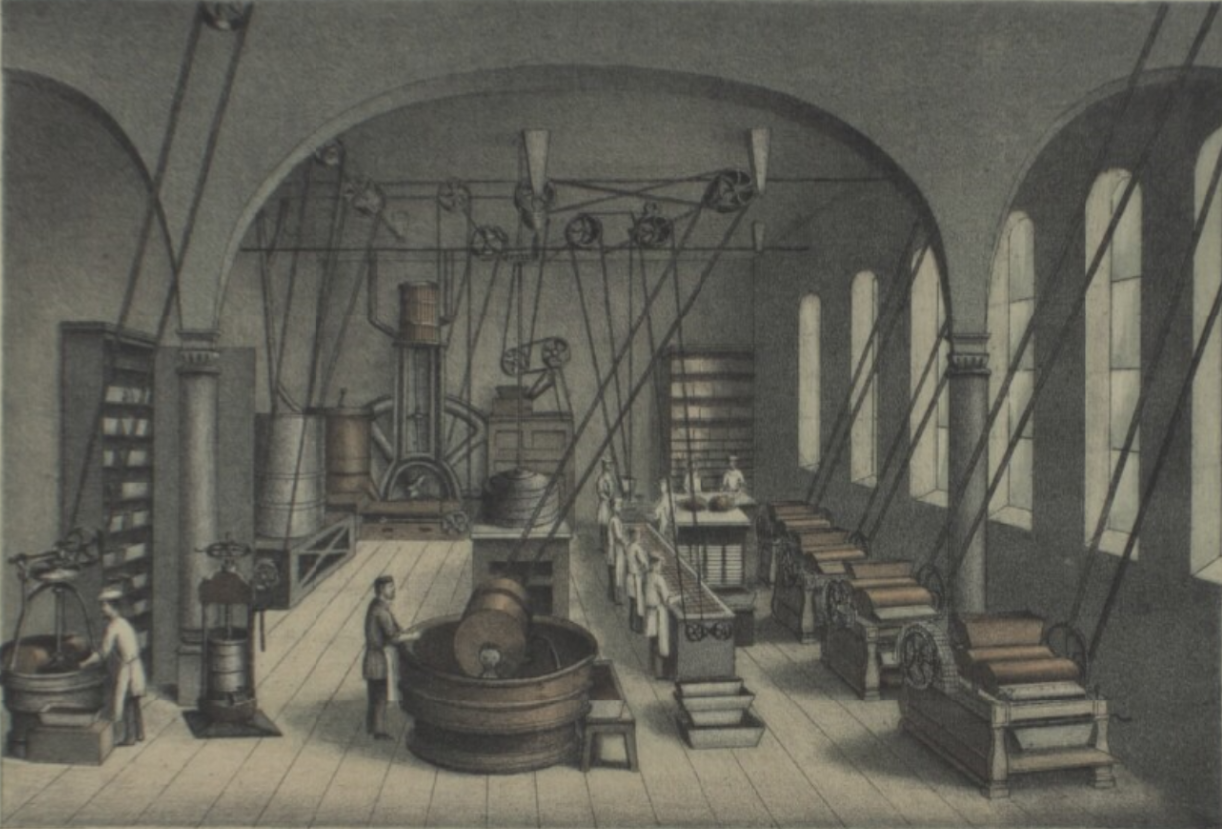
Brødrene Cloëtta's chocolate factory in Niels Hemmingsens Gade

On 3 November 1862, Christoph Cloëtta and his two brothers opened a chocolate factory under the name Brødrene Cloëtta (Cloëtta Brothers) in which he soon came to play a dominant role. The factory was initially based in a building at Sortedam Mill outside the city but was after a few years moved to a building at Niels Hemmingsens Gade 32. This led to a period with rapid growth. Brødrene Cloëtta was in 1983 granted a royal warrant.

In 1873 they also opened a chocolate factory in Malmö with Nuttin Cloëtta in charge of the operations. It was followed by a chocolate factory in Kristiania (now Oslo) in 1896.

== Personal life and legacy ==
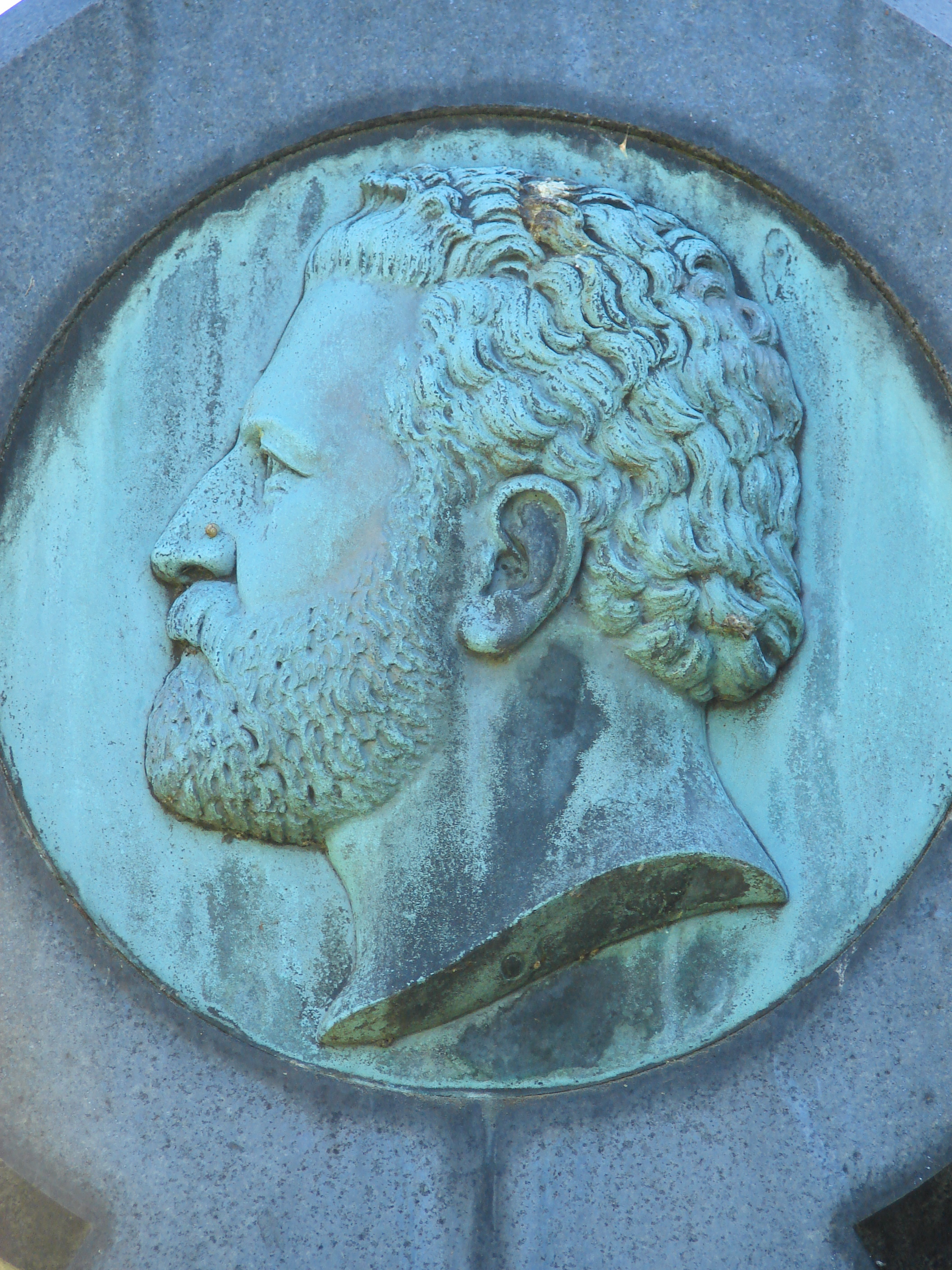
Bronze portrait relief on Cloëtta's grave

On 14 May 1869 in Købelev, Cloëtta married Ida Friis (1848-1901). She was the daughter of war secretary Nis Fritz Friis (1809–84) and Axeline Louise Adelaide Tuxen (1816–98). Together the couple had

- Jacobina (b. 1870)
- Louisa (b. 1871)
- Magdalena (b. 1873)
- Otto Fritz (b. 1874-d. 1875)
- Fritz Bernhard (b. 1876)
- Ursulina (b. 1878)
- Bertha (b. 1880)

Cloëtta was appointed as Swiss consul in 1888. He is one of the businessmen depicted on Peder Severin Krøyer's monumental 1895 group portrait painting From Copenhagen Stock Exchange. He died on 30 May 1897 and is buried at Assistens Cemetery. His gravestone features a bronze portrait relief.

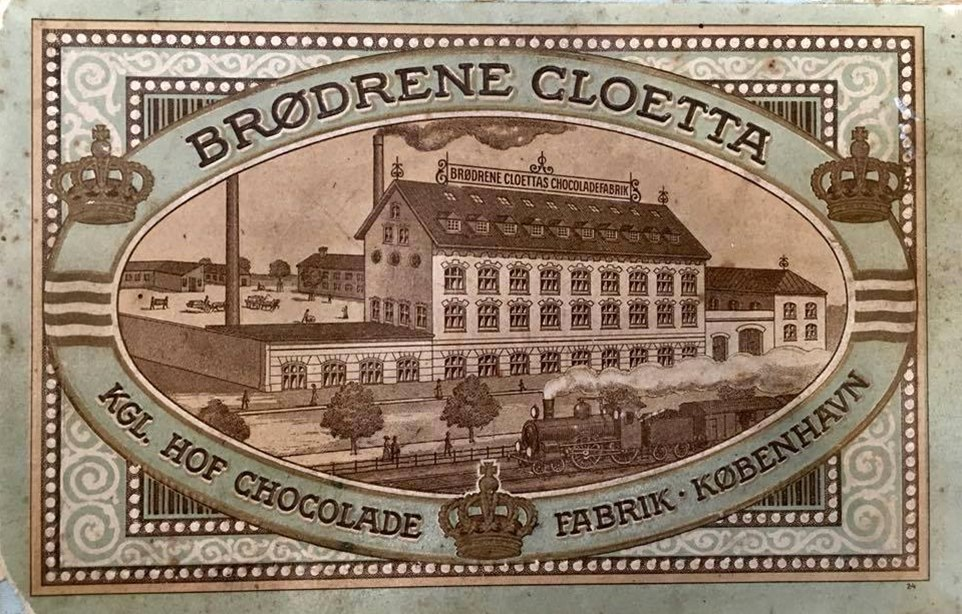
Brødrene Cloetta.

The company was continued by his widow and his son Fritz Bernhard Cloëtta (12 February 1876 – 15 May 1950). As of 1901, Fritz Bernhard Cloëtta was the sole owner of the company. The operations were that same year moved to a new building at Hørsholmsgade 20 in Nørrebro. The company moved to Glostrup in the first half of the 1950s and is now headquartered in Ljungsbro, Sweden.

== See also ==
- Grandjean House
- Christian F. Kehlet
