= Christmas in Hungary =

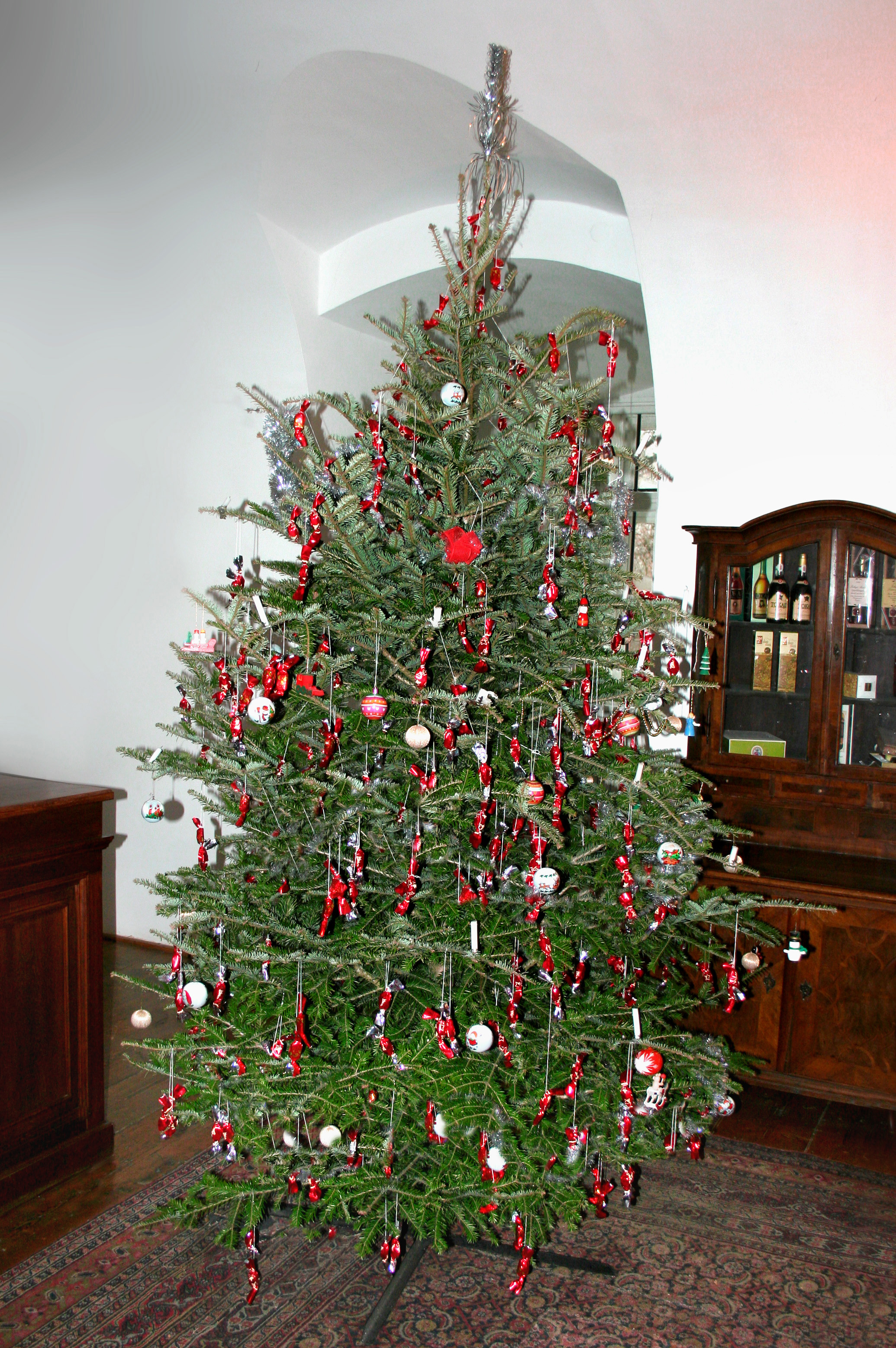
A Hungarian Christmas tree

Christmas in Hungary is celebrated with traditions similar to those found in other Central European countries (See: Christmas worldwide) as well as customs unique to the region.

== Advent ==
Hungarians burn candles on an Advent wreath during the four weeks before Christmas.

== Mikulás ==
The Christmas and gift-giving season starts relatively early compared to other cultures, with the Hungarian version of Saint Nicholas, Mikulás (or Szent Miklós) traditionally visiting the homes of Hungarian children on the night of 5 December, on the eve of Saint Nicholas Feast Day, 6 December.

Although the role of gift-giver on Christmas Day itself is assigned to the Christ Child, on the night before St. Nicholas Day Hungarian children traditionally place a boot on their windowsill waiting for Mikulás to come by and fill it with treats.

In Hungary, Mikulás often comes with an assistant: a Krampusz who comes to scare and punish naughty children. Children that behaved badly that year are given virgács, a bundle of birch twigs. In the Czech Republic, Slovenia and Slovakia, Mikulás has another assistant, a good Angel, who gives out presents to good children. In the Netherlands and Belgium, he is often joined by a black-faced man called Zwarte Piet.

To expatriate Hungarians and those non-natives of Hungarian lineage, the celebration is often referred to as "Hungarian Christmas".

In the traditional Nicholas-walk, on 6 December, St. Nicholas comes clothed in a bishop's attire, a long red coat and a red cap on his head, holding a shepherd's crook in one hand, and carrying a sack full of gifts on his back. Parents usually tell their children that he cannot be seen because he arrives in the middle of the night when good little children are already fast asleep and to not try to stay up so late, otherwise he won't give you any presents, only a birch stick (virgács).

== Nagykarácsony ==
Before 24 December, people decorate their houses and start to cook and bake. At Christmas, the family members come together and celebrate.

On 24 December, people bring their Christmas tree inside, decorate it with ornaments and szaloncukor. Sometimes this is said to be done by an angel or baby Jesus while the children are playing outside. Wrapped presents from family and friends are placed under the tree.

The dinner meal on Christmas Eve is often festive but more likely to involve a small number of people, perhaps just the immediate family members. Gift-giving is done after the meal, and after singing carols around the tree.

On Christmas Eve, Hungarians may sing or listen to holiday songs such as "Silent Night". They may attend Christmas mass either in the evening or at midnight, depending on their denomination.

=== Hungarian Christmas meal ===
Hungarians celebrate Christmas Day with a large meal, either lunch or dinner, often joined by extended family and friends.

- Fish soup
- Christmas carp or other fish, often fried
- Stuffed cabbage
- Meats, such as chicken and pork, but turkey can also be used
- Aspic
- Christmas cake
- Bejgli with walnut or poppy seeds
- Honeybread cookies (mézes kalács), more similar to pryanik than gingerbread

Hungarians also have szaloncukor, which is a typical Hungarian sweet often used to decorate the Christmas tree.
