= VAT Information Exchange System =

European value-added tax information transmission system

The VAT Information Exchange System (VIES) is an electronic means of transmitting information relating to VAT registration (i.e., validity of VAT numbers) of companies registered in the European Union. EU law requires that, where goods or services are procured within the EU by a VAT taxpayer, VAT must be paid only in the member state where the purchaser resides, while in other cases, VAT must be paid in the member state where the supplier resides. For this reason, suppliers need an easy way to validate the VAT numbers presented by purchasers. This validation is performed through VIES.

VIES does not itself maintain a VAT number database. Instead, it forwards the VAT number validation query to the database of the member state concerned and, upon reply, it transmits back to the inquirer the information provided by the member state. This information includes at least a "YES/NO" answer on the existence and validity of the supplied number. It may also include additional information, such as the holder's name and address, if this is provided by the member state. VIES optionally provides a unique reference number which can be used to prove to a tax authority that a particular VAT number was confirmed at time of purchase. The consultation number is only issued for queries that include the requester's own VAT identification number. As each query is answered by the database of the issuing member state, a national outage affects only numbers from that country. Numbers from other member states can still be checked during such an outage, and the affected country is reported as unavailable rather than its numbers as invalid.

A negative VIES validation result does not necessarily mean, however, that the VAT number of the purchaser is invalid. For example, the Polish law stipulates that an EU VAT number (registered in VIES) must only be obtained by the Polish VAT taxpayers performing intra-community acquisition of goods worth PLN 50′000 or more in a year. All other Polish VAT taxpayers may use the ordinary Polish NIP number (without the PL prefix and VIES registration) instead when performing their intra-community acquisitions (purchases), in spite of the fact that VIES will return a negative validation. Moreover, a VAT taxpayer with a VIES registration who declares PLN 0 worth of intra-community acquisitions in three consecutive months will automatically be delisted from VIES. Therefore, when the VIES validation returns a negative result, only the validation at the national level of the VAT taxpayer status of a NIP number may decisively clarify its validity as a valid VAT number (status check available freely at ).

Germany, Italy, Spain and Poland all provide such services at national level.
