= A. Søeborg's Fabrikker =

Danish confectionery company

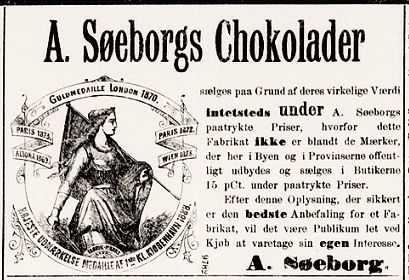
Advert for A. Søeborg's Fabrikker brought in Dannebrog on 10 January 1903

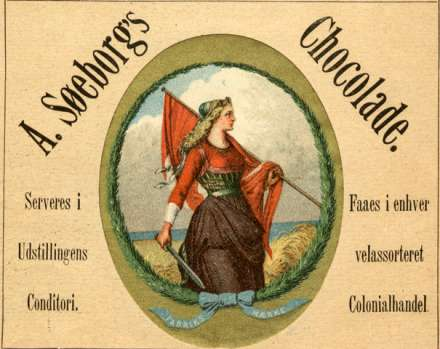
Advert for A. Søeborg's Fabrikker

A. Søeborg's Fabrikker was a confectionery company founded in 1849 in Copenhagen, Denmark. It was acquired by Brdr. Metz in 1953 and discontinued as an independent brand in 1963. Its factory was from 1880 located at Jagtvej 95 (later No. 95–99) in Nørrebro.

== History ==
A. Søeborg's Fabrikker was founded in 1849 by A. Søeborg (1804-1892) in Sølvgade . In 1872, it was ceded to his son F. Søeborg (1840-1917). In 1880, he inaugurated a new factory on Jagtvej in Nørrebro.

In 1903, A. Søeborg's Fabrikker was acquired by MPharm Herluf Rubow (1869-1948). In 1941, it was converted into a limited company (aktieselskab) with MPharm C. N. Korsgaard (born 1903) as CEO of the company. On 23 November 1943, its factory on Jagtvej was hit by fire due to sabotage by the Bopa Group. In 1950 the board consisted of Harry A. Jensen (born 1889), Ove Juel-Christensen (born 1890), E. Trock-Jansen (born 1891) and Paul Wilhjelm (born 1893).

In 1953, it was acquired by Brdr. Metz A/S but continued as an independent brand. On 31 January 1963, it was discontinued but production continued under the name Brdr. E. Metz. The buildings on Jagtvej were sold in 1971.

== Location ==
The company was based at Jagtvej 95–99 in Copenhagen. The company opened a flagship shop at Kongens Nytorv 16 in 1914.

== Advertisement ==
A- S'eborgs Fanrikker obtained permission to use Elisabeth Jerichau-Baumann's painting Mother Denmark in their logo. In 2015–1923, Mathilde Muus published a series of cook books under her pseudonum E. Constantin as advertisement for the company.
