= Společnost s ručením omezeným =

Czech Republic legal structure for a private limited liability company

Společnost s ručením omezeným (lit. ‘company with limited liability’) is the Czech and Slovak legal structure for a private limited company (as it is known in the United Kingdom) or a LLC (as it is known in the United States). The commercial name of a limited liability company must include the designation “společnost s ručením omezeným” (Czech) or “spoločnosť s ručením obmedzeným” (Slovak), (e.g. “limited liability company”), or in abbreviated forms, to wit: “spol. s r. o.” or “s. r. o.”.

== See also ==
- Compare to Akciová společnost (a. s.)
- in Slovakia Spoločnosť s ručením obmedzeným
