= Spoločnosť s ručením obmedzeným =

Type of business entity in Slovakia

Spoločnosť s ručením obmedzeným (abbreviation spol. s r. o. or s. r. o.; literal translation: “company with limited liability”) is a Slovak law business entity, the legal structure for a private limited liability company. It is the rough equivalent of United States LLC and United Kingdom (and certain Commonwealth countries) Ltd. It is regulated under § 105 – 153 of Act. No 513/1991 Coll. (Commercial Code as amended).

It is very popular form of business organization due to ensurance of limited liability in exchange for a relatively small investment into the registered capital. From one to 50 associates can found it through a founding agreement with minimum registered capital of €5000, minimum €750 per person, in money or other property.

== Examples of companies ==
- Elnec s.r.o.
- ESET, spol. s r.o.
- Glass LPS, s.r.o.
- JetBrains, s.r.o.

== See also ==
- in Czech Republic společnost s ručením omezeným
