= Elnec =

Slovak manufacturer of device programming systems

Elnec s.r.o.
- Company type: Private
- Industry: Electronics, Technology
- Founded: 1991
- Headquarters: Prešov, Slovakia
- Products: Device programmers
- Website: www.elnec.com

Elnec is a Slovak manufacturer of device programming systems for programmable integrated circuits.

== History ==
Since its founding in 1991, the company has been oriented towards developing and manufacturing developer tools like device programmers, emulators, simulators and logic analyzers.

Core business of the company today is only the development and manufacture of equipment that transfers data into various non-volatile semiconductor devices. These devices can be sorted into three categories: microcontrollers, flash memory, and programmable logic devices.

Most of Elnec device programmers can be referred as universal due to support of many programmable devices from different semiconductor companies as Microchip, STMicroelectronics, EM microelectronics, etc.

Elnec’s products are sold also under ODM names as B&K Precision, Dataman or Minato.

One of company's competitors is Data I/O.

== Current products ==
Elnec production can be divided into groups:

- Multiprogramming systems (Production programmers) - Used for programming devices in high volumes by Electronics manufacturers and programming centers.
- Universal programmers - Designed for individual users (new electronics products development, chip tuning) and small manufacturers of electronics.
- Specialized programmers - Products specialized for programming specific programmable devices groups (families): EPROM, EEPROM, MCU, Flash, etc.
- Programming adapters - Programmable devices could be bought in different package types:SSOP, SOIC, PLCC, QFN, BGA, etc. Programming Adapters are used to convert a pinout of selected programmable device package into interface used by programmer. Elnec’s programmers use DIL interface as a standard.
