= Kommanditselskab =

Type of legal entity in Denmark

A kommanditselskab (Danish pronunciation: [kʰomænˈtitselˌskɛˀp, kʰɔ-]; abbreviated K/S) is the Danish equivalent of the limited partnership. The owners are divided into general partners (komplementarer in Danish) and limited partners (kommanditister in Danish). Often the only general partner of a K/S is an Anpartsselskab with the least possible capital, thus reducing the liability of the K/S to the capital of the Anpartsselskab.

== Liability ==
The general partners have joint and several liability for the debts of the partnership while the limited partners have limited liability i.e. they are only liable on debts incurred by the firm to the extent of their investment.

Often it is the general partners who are running the company while the limited partners acts as passive investors.

== Taxation of a K/S ==
In Danish tax law a K/S is not taxable and does thus not pay corporation taxes. This means that the assets of the K/S is taxed as personal assets of the owners. This is a great advantage if the K/S is having a deficit as this can be subtracted from the taxable income of the owners.

== See also ==
- Limited partnership The corresponding common law term.
- Kommanditgesellschaft The corresponding term in German law.
