= Anpartsselskab =

Danish form of a Limited Liability Company

Anpartsselskab (Danish pronunciation: [ˈænpʰɑtsselˌskɛˀp]; ApS) is the Danish term for a private limited company. ApS, when appended to the end of a Danish company name, is similar to Ltd. after the name of a British company. An ApS is required to have capital of at least 20,000 DKK (approx. 2,678 EUR).
