= Kommanditgesellschaft =

German name for a limited partnership business entity

A Kommanditgesellschaft (abbreviated KG, pronounced [kɔmanˈdɪtɡəˌzɛlʃaft]; from Kommandite + Gesellschaft) is the German name for a limited partnership business entity and is used in German, Belgian, Dutch, Austrian, and some other European legal systems. Its name derives from the commenda, an early Italian medieval form of limited partnership.

== Description ==
Partnerships may be formed in the legal forms of General Partnership (Gesellschaft bürgerlichen Rechts, GbR), or specialized in trading (Offene Handelsgesellschaft, OHG), or Limited Partnership (Kommanditgesellschaft, KG).

In the OHG, all partners are fully liable for the partnership's debts, whereas in the KG there are general partners (Komplementäre) with unlimited liability and limited partners (Kommanditisten) whose liability is restricted to their fixed contributions to the partnership. Although a partnership itself is not a legal entity, it may acquire rights and incur liabilities, acquire title to real estate and sue or be sued.

For example, a Gesellschaft mit beschränkter Haftung & Compagnie KG (GmbH & Co. KG) is a limited partnership with, typically, the sole general partner being a limited liability company. It can thus combine the advantages of a partnership with those of the limited liability of a corporation.

A dormant partnership (stille Gesellschaft) comes into existence when a person makes a contribution to an existing enterprise (company, partnership, sole proprietorship) and shares in the latter's profits. The dormant partner has no liability for the debts of the enterprise; in case of insolvency of the enterprise he is a creditor with the portion of his contribution not consumed by losses. Strictly speaking, the dormant partnership is nothing more than an 'undisclosed participation'.

A Civil-Law Association is not a legal entity and cannot sue or be sued. It is often used for single joint ventures (e.g. construction projects) and comes to an end when the joint project has been completed.

A Private Foundation (Privatstiftung) constitutes a conglomeration of property having legal personality but no shareholders; its activities involve managing its own funds and assets for the beneficiaries.

== In other countries ==
In Indonesia, it is legally called commanditaire vennootschap (CV) or Persekutuan Komanditer, derived from colonial Dutch administration.

In Japan, it is called a gōshi gaisha.

In Denmark and Norway, it is known as a kommanditselskab and kommandittselskap, respectively.
