= Aktieselskab =

Type of corporation in Denmark

Aktieselskab (pronounced [ˈɑkɕəselˌskɛˀp]; lit. 'stock company') is the Danish name for a stock-based corporation. An aktieselskab may be either publicly traded or private.

The term aktieselskab may be abbreviated AS, A/S, A/S, A/S, a/s, or various other orthographic stylizations along the same lines. ⅍ (U+214D ⅍ AKTIESELSKAB) is a dedicated Unicode character for this abbreviation and is distinct from the similar U+2101 ℁ ADDRESSED TO THE SUBJECT. This abbreviation is pronounced [ˈɛˀ ˈes] in Danish, and [¹ˈɑː ¹ˈesː] or [²ˈɑˑˌesː] in Norwegian (aksjeselskap).

== Liability ==
The shareholders of an aktieselskab are not liable for the debts of the company. If an A/S is owned by a holding company (typically another A/S or ApS), the profit from the production company can be transferred to the holding company and the two will be taxed as if they were one entity (sambeskatning; joint taxation).

Both an aktieselskab (A/S) and an anpartselskab (ApS) are, by definition, limited liability companies; the main difference is that only the A/S issues stock. In case of bankruptcy, creditors are not able to pursue claims against investors who have not personally provided security. Professional lenders such as banks will consequently demand security for credit lent to an A/S or ApS, since secured debt is given legal preference over unsecured debt.

In case of bankruptcy, if the defaulting party is a production company registered as an A/S or ApS and is in turn owned by a holding company registered as an A/S or ApS, transactions between the two may be subject to scrutiny by the bobestyrer, the lawyer and accountant handling the bankruptcy case. Transactions between the two companies may be legally undone if the bobestyrer determines that they were not based on normal business operations, but were an attempt by the management of the defaulting company to strip it of assets with the intent to defraud its creditors. This power is vested in Konkursloven [Bankruptcy Law] articles 64-81.

== Formation of an aktieselskab ==
The formation of an aktieselskab requires a number of steps, including the following:

- Notification concerning the formation to the Danish Business Authorities.
- Registration of the company.
- Resolution to form the company at the first general meeting.
- Subscription for shares and payment of the share capital. The share capital must be greater than 400,000 DKK.
- The signing of a memorandum of association, which must contain a draft of the articles of association of the company.

An aktieselskab can only acquire rights or incur obligations as a company when it has been registered at the Danish Commerce and Companies Agency.

== Share capital ==
The share capital registered at the Danish Commerce and Companies Agency must be at least 400,000 DKK. This amount was changed in 2018 from the previous 500,000 DKK. The capital can come from contributions of cash or other assets.

If half of the capital is lost, the board of directors must convene a general meeting within six months.

== Board of directors ==
An aktieselskab must have a board of directors consisting of at least three members. Members of the board can be elected for a period of up to four years, depending on the articles of association.

The board members are usually elected at the general meeting. The articles of association may confer upon public authorities or any third party the right to appoint one or more members of the board of directors. In companies with an average workforce of over 35 employees during the last three years, the employees are entitled to elect among themselves a number of members of the board of directors equal to half of the members of the board of directors elected by the shareholders or appointed by third parties.

== See also ==
- Aksjeselskap (the corresponding concept in Norway)
- Aktiebolag (the corresponding concept in Sweden)
- Aktiengesellschaft (the corresponding term in Germany)
- Akciová společnost (a.s.) (the corresponding concept in the Czech Republic)
- Anpartsselskab (ApS), in Denmark a limited liability company that does not issue stock
- Limited liability company
- Naamloze Vennootschap (the corresponding concept in the Netherlands and Belgium)
- Osakeyhtiö (the corresponding concept in Finland)
- Public limited company (the corresponding concept in the UK and in Ireland)
- S. A. (the corresponding concept in France, Spain, and other Romance countries)
- АД - Акционерно дружество, (AD - the corresponding concept in Bulgaria)
