= ENK =

ENK may refer to:

- Enkeltpersonforetak, a type of sole proprietorship in Norway
- Enkor, a defunct Russian airline
- Enniskillen/St Angelo Airport, in Northern Ireland
