= NUF (disambiguation) =

NUF may refer to:

- Norskregistrert utenlandsk foretak, a Norwegian branch of foreign companies
- nuf, the ISO 639-3 code for Nusu language
- Harakat-e Islami (NUF), a political party of the Afghan Northern Alliance
- National United Front, a political alliance in Myanmar
- Castlereigh Water Airport, the IATA code NUF
- Nutfield railway station, the station code NUF
