= Aktiengesellschaft =

Type of business entity in German-speaking countries

Aktiengesellschaft (German pronunciation: [ˈaktsi̯ənɡəˌzɛlʃaft]; abbreviated AG [aːˈgeː]) is a German word for a corporation limited by share ownership (i.e., one which is owned by its shareholders) whose shares may be traded on a stock market. The term is used in Liechtenstein, Germany, Austria, Switzerland (where it is equivalent to a société anonyme or a società per azioni) and South Tyrol (Note: A German-speaking region of Italy.) for companies incorporated there. In the United Kingdom, the equivalent term is public limited company, and in the United States, while the terms "incorporated" or "corporation" are typically used, technically the more precise equivalent term is "joint-stock company".

== Meaning of the word ==
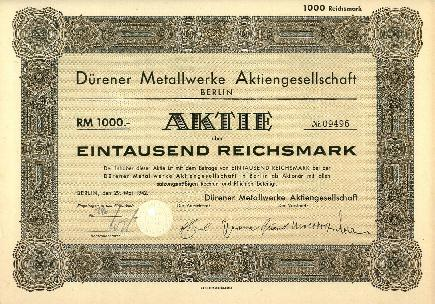
Example of an Aktie, with a nominal value of 1,000 ℛ︁ℳ︁

The German word Aktiengesellschaft is a compound noun made up of two elements: Aktien meaning an acting part or share, and Gesellschaft, meaning company or society. English translations include share company, or company limited by shares, or joint-stock company. In German, the use of the term Aktien for shares is restricted to Aktiengesellschaften. Shares in other types of German companies (e.g., GmbH or a cooperative) are called Anteile (parts-of) rather than Aktien.

== Legal basis ==
In Germany and Austria, the legal basis of the AG is respectively the German and Austrian Aktiengesetz (abbr. AktG; "shares law"). Since the German commercial law (§ 19 Handelsgesetzbuch) requires all corporations to specify their legal form in their name, in order to inform the public of the limits on their liability, all German (required by § 4 Aktiengesetz) and Austrian stock corporations include Aktiengesellschaft or AG as part of their name, frequently as a suffix.

In Switzerland, the Company Limited by Shares (Aktiengesellschaft in German, société anonyme in French, società anonima in Italian, societad anonima in Romansh) is defined in Title Twenty-Six of the Code of Obligations, Article 620. Article 950 specifies that the business name must indicate the legal form.

== Structure ==
German AGs have a "two-tiered board" structure, consisting of a supervisory board (Aufsichtsrat) and a management board (Vorstand). The supervisory board is generally controlled by shareholders, although employees may have seats, depending on the size of the company. The management board directly runs the company, but its members may be removed by the supervisory board, which also determines the management board's compensation. Some German AGs have management boards which determine their own remuneration, but that situation is now relatively uncommon.

The general meeting is the supreme governing body of a Swiss company limited by shares. It elects the board of directors (Verwaltungsrat in German) and the external auditors. The board of directors may appoint and dismiss persons entrusted with managing and representing the company.

== Similar forms ==
The equivalent terms in other countries include the following, which mostly mean literally either "share company/society" or "anonymous company/society".

- Argentina, Bolivia, Costa Rica, Peru, Spain, and other Spanish-speaking countries – Sociedad Anónima (S.A.)
- Belgium (Dutch language), Netherlands – Naamloze Vennootschap (N.V.)
- Belgium (French language), France – Société Anonyme (S.A.)
- Brazil – Sociedade Anônima (S.A. or S/A or SA)
- Bulgaria – Акционерно дружество (Akcionerno druzhestvo), derived directly from the German AG
- Croatia – dioničko društvo (d.d.)
- Czech Republic – Akciová společnost – (a.s.)
- Denmark – Aktieselskab (A/S)
- Estonia – Aktsiaselts (AS)
- Finland – Osakeyhtiö (Oy)
- Greece – Ανώνυμος Εταιρεία (Anonymos Etaireia) (A.E., but often translated as S.A.)
- Hungary – Részvénytársaság (Rt)
- Indonesia – Perseroan Terbatas (PT)
- Japan – Kabushiki gaisha (K.K.), originally derived directly from the German AG (the term is based on the German) until law reforms under the United States–led Occupation of Japan made the form similar to Illinois corporate law
- Italy – Società per azioni (SpA), derived directly from the German AG
- Latvia - Akciju sabiedrība (AS)
- Malaysia – Berhad (Bhd)
- Norway – Aksjeselskap (AS)
- Romania – Societate pe acțiuni or "Societate anonimă" (S.A.)
- Russia – Публичное акционерное общество (Publichnoe akcionernoe obschestvo) (ПАО)
- Serbia – deoničarsko društvo (d.d.) and akcionarsko društvo (a.d.)
- Slovakia – Akciová spoločnosť (a.s.)
- Slovenia – Delniška družba (d.d.)
- Sweden – Aktiebolag (AB)
- Turkey – Anonim Şirket (A.Ş.)
- Poland – Spółka akcyjna (SA)
- Portugal – Sociedade Anónima (S.A.)
- United Kingdom and Ireland (English) – Public limited company (Plc)
- United Kingdom (Welsh) – cymdeithas cyhoeddus cyfyngedig (ccc)

== See also ==
- Gesellschaft mit beschränkter Haftung (GmbH)
- Volkseigener Betrieb (VEB)
- S.A. (corporation)
