= ISO 20275 =

ISO 20275:2017 is an ISO standard first published in 2017 codifying entity legal forms (Elf).

The standard delegates maintaining the entity legal forms to the Global Legal Entity Identifier Foundation (GLEIF), who is also responsible for the integrity of the Legal Entity Identifier system.
