= National Business Center (Albania) =

- Qendra Kombëtare e Biznesit
- Official logo

Business agency overview
- Jurisdiction: Albania
- Headquarters: Tirana
- Business agency executive: Pranvera Fagu, Director General
- Website: qkb.gov.al

The National Business Center (Albanian: Qendra Kombëtare e Biznesit) is the national agency of the Albanian government in charge of granting business licenses.

The National Business Center is an institution under the supervision of the Ministry of Finance and Economy, established under Law No.131/2015 "On the National Business Center", as a result of the merger of two institutions, the National Licensing Center and the National Registration Center.

The main purpose of QKB is to facilitate the procedures and registration of entities defined in the law governing business registration, for the purpose of fiscal registration, social and health insurance, and labor relations inspection.

== See also ==
- Shoqëri Tregtare
