= S.A. (corporation) =

Type of corporation in countries that mostly employ civil law

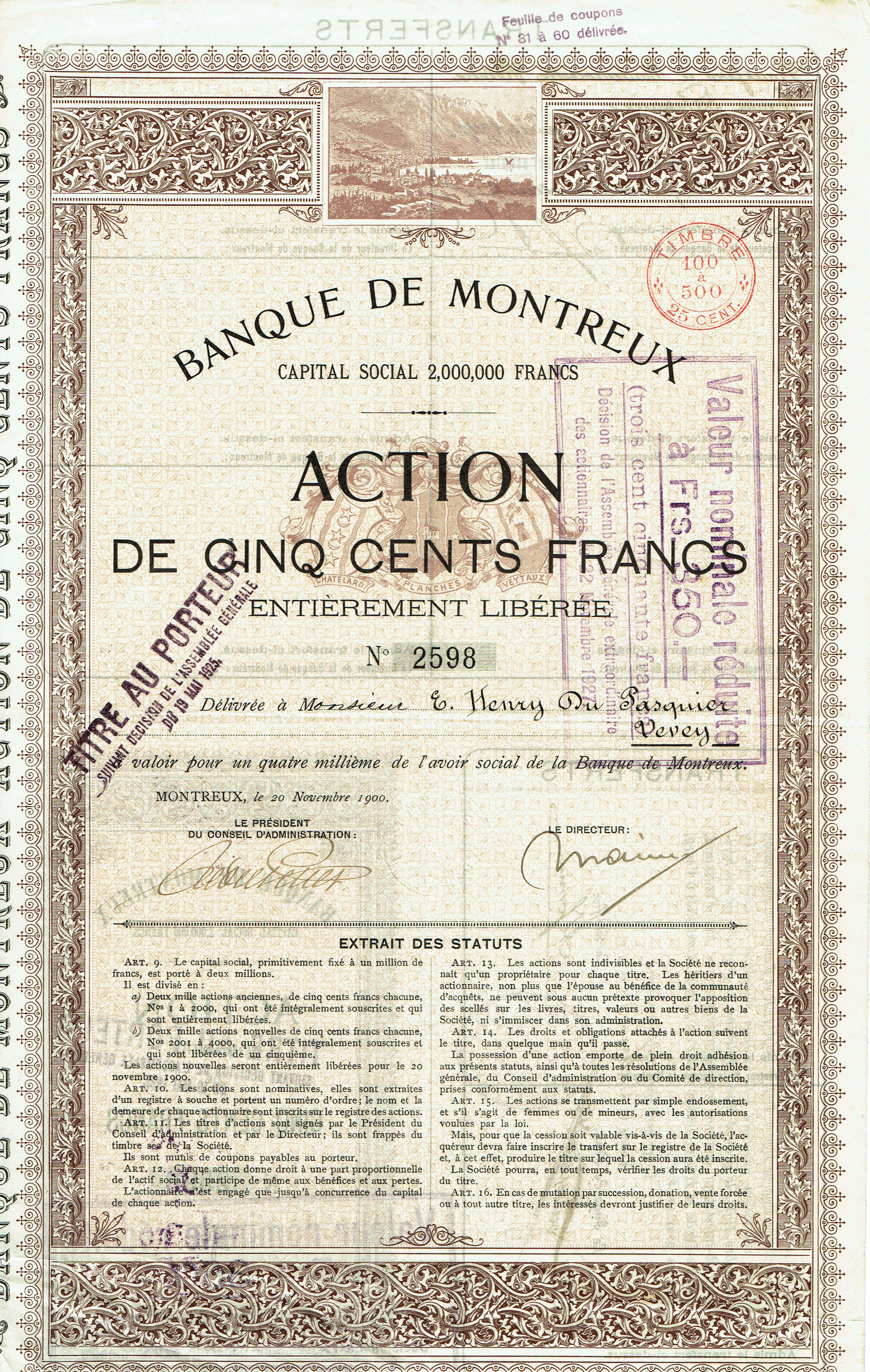
Share of the Banque de Montreux, issued 20 November 1900. Sociétés anonymes were common in Switzerland at this time.

The abbreviation S.A. or SA (Note: Depending on language, SA can mean anonymous company, anonymous partnership, share company, or joint-stock company. See § In different countries.) designates a type of public limited company in certain countries, most of which have a Romance language as their official language and operate a derivative of the 1804, Napoleonic, civil law. Originally, shareholders could be anonymous and collect dividends by surrendering coupons attached to their share certificates. Dividends were paid to whoever held the certificate. Since share certificates could be transferred privately, corporate management would not necessarily know who owned its shares – nor did anyone but the holders.

As with bearer bonds, anonymous unregistered share ownership and dividend collection enabled money laundering, tax evasion, and concealed business transactions in general, so governments passed laws to audit the practice. Nowadays, shareholders of SAs are not anonymous, though shares can still be held by a holding company to obscure the beneficiary.

== Variations ==
=== Abbreviation ===
S.A. can be an abbreviation of:

- Sociedade Anónima in Galician and European Portuguese (used in Portugal, Timor Leste, Macao, and Lusophone Africa)
  - Equivalent as 股份有限公司 in Chinese for Macau
- Sociedade Anônima in Brazilian Portuguese (used in Brazil)
- Sociedá Anónima in Asturian and Leonese
- Societat Anònima in Catalan
- Société anonyme in French (as used in French-speaking countries such as France (including French Polynesia, and New Caledonia) and Monaco; also in partially Francophone countries and/or nations with French as one of their official languages like Belgium (where it is equivalent to a naamloze vennootschap), Luxembourg (also identifiable in Luxembourgish as Aktiegesellschaft), Switzerland (where it is equivalent to an Aktiengesellschaft or a Società Anonima), as well as Haiti, Lebanon, and such African countries as Egypt, Tunisia, Morocco, Mauritania, Senegal, Ivory Coast, and Algeria)
- Société par actions in Canadian French
- Società Anonima in Swiss Italian (in Italy replaced by Società per azioni, S.p.A., since 1942)
- Sociedad Anónima or Sociedad por Acciones in Spanish
  - Mexican law also takes into account the variability of the corporate stock, resulting in most S.A. turning into Sociedad Anónima de Capital Variable (S.A. de C.V.), or Sociedad Anónima Bursátil de Capital Variable (S.A.B. de C.V.) for publicly traded companies.
  - Mexico also has Sociedad de Responsabilidad Limitada de Capital Variable (S. de R.L. de C.V.), which is analogous to the limited liability company.
- Spółka Akcyjna ("Joint-stock company") in Polish
- Societate pe Acțiuni in Romanian

"SA" has been incorporated into the names of some companies derived from acronyms, such as Cepsa, originally Compañía Española de Petróleos, Sociedad Anónima, "Spanish petroleum company, S.A.", and Sabena, originally Societé anonyme belge d'Exploitation de la Navigation aérienne, "Belgian S.A. of exploitation of air navigation".

=== Literal meaning ===
It is equivalent in literal meaning and function to:

- Naamloze vennootschap (N.V.) in Dutch
- Perseroan Terbatas Terbuka (P.T. Tbk.) in Indonesia
- Berhad (Bhd.) in Malaysia
- Anonim Şirket (A.Ş.) or Anonim Ortaklık (A.O.) in Turkish
- Corporación anónima (C.A.) in Ecuador
- Compañía anónima (C.A.) in Venezuela
- Anonymi Etaireia (Ανώνυμη Εταιρεία, A.E.) in Greek is usually translated into S.A. in English and foreign languages.

=== Function ===
It is equivalent in function to:

- Shoqëri Aksionare (Sh.a.) in Albanian
- شركة مساهمة عامة ذات مسؤولية محدودة ش.ذ.م.م, Sharikah musāhamah ʿāmmah dhāt mas'ūliyyah maḥdūdah (lit. 'Public share company with limited liability') in Arabic
- Dioničko društvo (d.d.) in Croatian and Bosnian
- Акционерно дружество, Aktsionerno druzhestvo (АД) in Bulgarian
- Акционерско друштво, Akcionersko društvo (АД) in Macedonian
- Akciová společnost (a.s.) in Czech
- Aktieselskab (A/S) in Danish
- Société anonyme égyptienne (S.A.E.) or شركة مساهمة مصرية (Sherka mosahama Maṣreyya, lit. 'Egyptian share company', abbreviated ش.م.م) in Egypt
- Julkinen osakeyhtiö (Oyj) in Finnish
- Aktsiaselts (AS) in Estonian
- Aktiengesellschaft (AG) in German
- Részvénytársaság (Rt) in Hungarian
- Hlutafélag (Hf) in Icelandic
- Private Limited (Pvt. Ltd.) in India and Pakistan
- Public limited company (plc) in the United Kingdom, Ireland, Malta, and several Commonwealth countries
- Kabushiki gaisha (K.K.) or 株式会社 in Japan
- Jusighoesa (J) or 주식회사 in Korea
- Société anonyme laotienne (S.A.L.) in Laos
- Akcinė bendrovė (AB) in Lithuanian
- Akciju sabiedrība (AS) in Latvian
- Aksjeselskap (AS) in Norwegian
- Spółka Akcyjna (SA) ("Joint-stock company") in Polish
- Акционерное общество, Aktsionernoye obshchestvo (AO) in Russian
- Деоничарско друштво, Deoničarsko društvo (d.d.), or Акционарско друштво, Akcionarsko društvo (a.d.) in Serbian
- Private Limited (Pte. Ltd.) in Singapore
- Akciová spoločnosť (a.s.) in Slovak
- Delniška družba (d.d.) in Slovene
- Aktiebolag (AB) in Swedish
- Incorporated in the Philippines (formerly used Spanish S.A., corporate structures were Americanized during the US colonial period)
- Акціонерне товариство, Aktsionerne tovarystvo (AT) in Ukrainian
- Publicly traded company ("public company") or Incorporated (Inc.) in the United States, though the former term does not appear in the names of business entities
- Compañía Anónima (C.A.) in Andorra
- ក.អ(ក្រុមហ៊ុនអនាមិក) or Société anonyme cambodgienne (S.A.C.; lit. 'Cambodian share company') in Cambodia
- Công ti cổ phần in Vietnam
- 股份有限公司 in Chinese

== See also ==
- Président-directeur général (France)
- AG
- Sociedad Anónima Deportiva – Spanish legal status for sports companies
  - Sociedade Anónima Desportiva – Type of business entity in Portugal
