= Kommandittselskap =

Kommandittselskap (KS) is a Norwegian type of company. The company is owned by two types of entities; the komplementar, who holds unlimited liability, and one or more komandittist who hold limited liability. The company type is thus a middle form between a limited and unlimited company. The komplementar can be, and often is, a limited liability company, which indirectly and in practice will limit the liability for the ultimate owner(s) of the komplementar.

Each komandittist must pay equity of NOK 20,000, of which 20% must be paid before the registration at Brønnøysund Register Centre. The komplementar must supply at least 10% of the total equity. Dividend is paid out in proportion to the supplied equity, unless otherwise agreed upon. Taxation of a KS follows the same rules as taxation from an ansvarlig selskap (unlimited company, ANS), so there is no double taxation. KS's must be audited and submit their accounts to the authorities.

Of tax reasons, the company was quite popular in the 1980s, but after changes in the tax law most of the advantages disappeared. After this the company form is mainly used for real estate investment collaborations.
