= Norskregistrert utenlandsk foretak =

Norskregistrert utenlandsk foretak or NUF is a Norwegian term meaning Norwegian Registered Foreign Company. NUF is considered a Norwegian branch of foreign companies. In this regard, one has to distinguish between companies that are Norwegian in a fiscal sense and Norwegian companies in a company law meaning. The formal legal basis for registration is The Business Enterprise Registration Act of 1985 with later amendments, ss 3–8.

== The process of incorporation ==
When a NUF is registered, the branch itself is given a nine-digit Norwegian company number, in a similar manner as a regular Norwegian company – and a pseudo certificate of incorporation is issued by the Norwegian Register of Business Enterprises, showing the Norwegian board of directors (if any), any power of procuration, position or attorney, and similar basic information. However, the NUF remains a branch and not a legal entity separate from the foreign company. It is de facto the foreign company itself, operating in Norway under a separate company number.

A NUF may register and operate under any company name, subject to the same guidelines for company name approval as a regular Norwegian company. However, if the name of the Norwegian branch differs from the foreign company, it may not use any terms that describe the form of company (such as "Ltd", "S.A.", "AS", "AB" etc.). Hence a foreign company called Roundtable Ltd may be Roundtable Ltd in Norway, or Roundtable or Somethingdifferent but not Somethingdifferent Ltd.

Any type of company from any independent country recognized by Norway, may register a branch in Norway.

== The duties of the board of directors in an NUF ==
In most cases, the NUF and the foreign legal entity will share the same board of directors. However, if one or more persons are only directors in Norway, the duties and responsibility of these directors are not currently regulated by law.

== Bankruptcy or involuntary liquidation of NUF ==
A NUF is not a separate legal entity and as such cannot be declared or itself declare bankruptcy. However, bankruptcy may be declared in the foreign main entity. If the main entity has its actual place of management in Norway, it may be declared bankrupt there.

== The development of NUFs ==
The number of NUFs increased phenomenally since the millennium. The main reason is first and foremost not actual foreign companies setting up branches in Norway, but Norwegian residents setting up inactive companies abroad and then forming a Norwegian branch of the same company. This construction was made possible by the freedom of establishment within the EU / EEA. In 1999, the EU court in a preliminary ruling established that this freedom of establishment gives any EU / EEC citizen the right to set up his company in the jurisdiction of his choice, regardless of where the company is actually going to operate or where he himself is physically or fiscally a resident. Denmark had refused such registrations, based on the grounds that the establishment of a foreign entity was without any reality and merely an attempt to avoid the national rules on the provision for and the paying-up of minimum share capital. Denmark lost the case, and the EU court not only stressed that a citizen had the right to start and operate his business in any jurisdiction within the EU, and to freely open any branch of the same company in any country, but also directly commented that it was fully acceptable to use this structure to attempt to avoid national company law requirements, such as the requirement for a minimum paid up share capital.

"In addition, it is clear from paragraph 16 of Segers that the fact that a company does not conduct any business in the Member State in which it has its registered office and pursues its activities only in the Member State where its branch is established is not sufficient to prove the existence of abuse or fraudulent conduct which would entitle the latter Member State to deny that company the benefit of the provisions of Community law relating to the right of establishment." (quote from section 28 of the decision)

Following the Centros case, Europe has seen a massive increase in so-called cross-border-incorporations. Many observers now feel that Europe is moving rapidly in the direction of company law situation in the US, where it is fairly common to incorporate a company in a different state than where the actual business operations are intended to be conducted.

Norway, along with Germany and the Netherlands, have been among the EU states where cross-border-incorporations have become most common. The main reasons are most likely that these jurisdictions all have a fairly complicated company laws with strict requirements to annual audits and a minimum paid up share capital. In Norway, the NUF companies avoid both the requirement to file an annual audit (and to maintain at any time an official company auditor), and the requirement to pay up a minimum share capital of NOK 100,000. However, from 1 January 2012 the requirement of minimum share capital was lowered to NOK 30,000 which may affect the number of NUF start-ups in the future.

There has been some political debate in Norway, with some politicians expressing concerns about the amount of NUFs incorporated, and in 2005 the government requested the Norwegian Tax Administration and the Ministry of Finance to consider the possible causes and consequences. The Ministry of Finance, prior to the consultation round, made it very clear that Norway neither legally could, nor intended to attempt to, prohibit the registration of NUFs, and that the review made by the ministry would mainly focus on the legal framework that currently enables NUFs to operate with significant benefits compared to Norwegian limited companies.

During the consultation round, surprisingly few of the bodies invited to give their opinions, expressed any deep concerns over the increasing number of NUFs, the union of auditors representing a rather expected exception. As a consequence, the ministry decided to maintain the current legal situation, and rather conduct a full review of the burdens imposed on Norwegian limited companies.

== The competitive ability of Norwegian AS (limited) companies ==
Norway was one of the last countries in Europe to drop the requirement for an annual audit for all national limited companies (AS and ASA) regardless of the size or turnover of the company. In 2011 this requirement was lifted for small limiteds, i.e. companies with less than NOK 5,000,000 in turnover, fewer than 10 employees and a total value of assets less than NOK 20,000,000. Parent companies are still obliged to file annual accounts, regardless of size or activity. From 2012 the minimum share capital requirement will be relaxed. These two measures reduce the benefits of NUF's over small AS's.
