= Ansvarlig selskap =

Norwegian type of company

An ansvarlig selskap (Norwegian pronunciation: [ɑnˈsvɑ̀ːlɪ ˈsɛ̂lskɑp]; English: liable company) is a Norwegian legal form, mainly used in small and medium-sized enterprises, in which the company's individual owners are held personally liable for any outstanding debts acquired by the company. It is similar to a general partnership.

If any participant is unable to pay a share of the debt, it can be collected in full from the other participants. The term is usually abbreviated ANS when used in company names. The central law regulating limited liability companies in Norwegian law is the Companies Act of 1985.

Unlike an aksjeselskap, anyone is eligible to start an ANS, as the model does not require any starting investment capital. It is a widespread form of company in smaller, low-risk business areas. For more economically-risky ventures, an AS would be preferable, as the personal financial losses in the event of a bankruptcy would be limited to the capital invested: a bankrupted AS with a 2 million NOK debt, the investors would stand to lose the invested capital, for instance 100 thousand NOK. In an ANS or enkeltpersonforetak, however, the owner would be personally liable for the entire 2 million NOK.

In the case of several owners, if one is unable to pay, the entire sum would be collected from the others. By using a selskap med delt ansvar (DA), with two investors and a 50% liability share, each would be liable for 50% of the debt, and if one should be unable to pay (in the case of personal bankruptcy), the other would still have to carry no more than the 1 million NOK debt.

A business does not need to include the abbreviation for its type in its day-to-day operations, but it is required to register this in its legal name. As an example, a self-employed plumber in an ANS could name his shop "John Smith Plumbing", but his mail address, legal documents and so forth would have to carry the name "John Smith Plumbing ANS".
