= Akciju sabiedrība =

Legal form of a corporation in Latvia

Akciju sabiedrība (Latvian pronunciation: [ˈaktsiju ˈsabiɛdri:ba]; abbreviated a/s or AS, pronounced [ˈaːˈes]) is a Latvian word for a legal form of a corporation in Latvia. In English, the Latvian term akciju sabiedrība is translated as stock company by the Commercial Law of Latvia. In Latvia, stock companies (akciju sabiedrība or AS) are being registered by the Register of Enterprises of Latvia.

Akciju sabiedrība (AS) is a company whose shares or stocks may be publicly traded. In English, the roughly equivalent terms are Joint-stock company (JSC) and Public limited company (PLC).

Akciju sabiedrība is usually set up if intended to carry out a business requiring large investments. Since stock is a security, the raising of public capital by issuing new stock makes it easier to attract more investment than by offering shares to a closed range of applicants, as is the case with the limited liability company (LLC or SIA in Latvian). In addition, certain laws specifically require certain types of commercial activity to be conducted only by companies in the legal form of AS, such as banking, insurance, etc.

== Meaning of the words ==
The Latvian term Akciju sabiedrība consists of two elements: akcijas for stocks and sabiedrība meaning 'company' or 'society'.

== Legal form ==
The legal form Akciju sabiedrība is well known in the Romano-Germanic law legal system countries, for example, Lithuania, Estonia, Germany, Austria, Scandinavian countries. In Common-law legal systems, such as the United Kingdom and the United States, similar forms are Public limited company (PLC) and Joint stock company (JSC), respectively.

== Founding ==
Akciju sabiedrība must be registered with the Register of Enterprises of Latvia to start a business activity. On August 1, 2019, 1053 stock companies were registered in the Commercial Register. Akciju sabiedrība is a legal person. It shall have legal personality on the date on which it is entered in the Commercial Register.

== Equity ==
The equity of a stock company is the contribution made by each stockholder to the company's stocks. Minimum equity is 25 000 EUR.

== Types of Akciju sabiedrība ==
There are two types of Akciju sabiedrība - private (closed or slēgta in Latvian) and public (open or atvērta in Latvian).

=== Private (closed) stock company ===
Private stock company (slēgta akciju sabiedrība) are not publicly available to other investors, so investing in such a company will have to be privately negotiated with existing stockholders.

=== Public (open) stock company ===
Public stock companies (atvērta akciju sabiedrība) are joint stock companies whose stocks are financial instruments and are publicly traded, for example on the stock market. Joint stock companies participate in the regulated stock market in order to raise additional capital for their development through the issue of securities, thus enabling anyone to invest in and become a stockholder in the company.

When a joint stock company decides to trade its stocks on a regulated market, it is bound by the Financial Instruments Market law, which regulates the order in the regulated market. For the admission of securities to trading on a regulated market, a prospectus must be drawn up and approved by Latvijas Banka.

== Liability ==
The liability of Akciju sabiedrība is limited. Akciju sabiedrība shall be liable for its obligations with the whole of its property. The company shall not be liable for the obligations of its stockholders. Stockholders shall not be liable for the obligations of the company.

Akciju sabiedrība may be founded as the company with supplemental liability, in which at least one of the stockholders is liable personally with the whole of their property for the obligations of the company.

== Founders and shareholders (stockholders) ==
The founder of Akciju sabiedrība may be any natural or legal person. Minimum number of founders - 1. Stockholder registration (register keeping) is done by the Board of the company. Therefore, the Register of Stockholders of the company is not kept by the Register of Enterprises of Latvia and changes in the composition of the Register of Stockholders are not to be submitted to the Register of Enterprises.

== Structure ==
Akciju sabiedrība has a mandatory three-step management – the meeting of stockholders, supervisory board and management board.

=== The meeting of stockholders ===
The meeting of stockholders is the highest management body of the stock company, which has the right to decide on any issue. Only the meeting of stockholders is entitled to make decisions on the amendment of the articles of association, increase or decrease of the equity etc.

=== Supervisory board ===
The supervisory board is a body monitoring the activities of the management board and representing the interests of stockholders between the meetings. The supervisory board is a public oversight body that represents the interests of stockholders between meetings and oversees the activities of the management board. The supervisory board elects and dismisses the members of the management board, supervises the work of the management board, etc.

=== Management board ===
The management board is the executive body of Akciju sabiedrība, which on a day-to-day basis manages and represents Akciju sabiedrība, is responsible for its commercial activities, and manages assets and funds. The management board may be composed of one or more members. Public stock company has at least three members of the board.

== Name of the company ==
The name of Akciju sabiedrība must include a reference to the legal form “akciju sabiedrība" or its abbreviation “AS”. The name must be clearly and distinctly different from the names already registered or applied for in the registers kept by the Register of Enterprises. The name should only contains the letters of the Latin or Latvian alphabet. The title may not contain the expression "Latvijas Republika” (Republic of Latvia) or its translation into a foreign language.

== Similar forms ==
- Estonia – Aktsiaselts (AS)
- Germany – Aktiengesellschaft (AG)
- Denmark – Aktieselskab (A/S)
- Norway – Aksjeselskap (AS)
- Sweden – Aktiebolag (AB)
- Finland – Osakeyhtiö (Oy)

== See also ==
- List of legal entity types by country
- Economy of Latvia
