= Selskap med delt ansvar =

Selskap med delt ansvar or DA (company with divided liability), is a type of company in Norway that does not have limited liability. The company will have two or more participants, who hold a given percentile ownership of the company. A DA is not based around stocks, like the aksjeselskap (AS), and there is no mutual liability, like in the ansvarlig selskap (ANS). Instead each participant is directly liable for its relative ownership in the company.

There is no need for a minimum initial equity in the company or for auditing if there are no more than 5 company participants or the revenues do not exceed 5 million NOK. The company is required to have neither a board of directors nor a managing director. If there is no managing director, any of the participants may sign for the company.

A disadvantage is that in case of bankruptcy, the owner will be held liable for a share of the debt.

== See also ==
- Ansvarlig selskap
