= Banque de Montreux =

Defunct Swiss bank

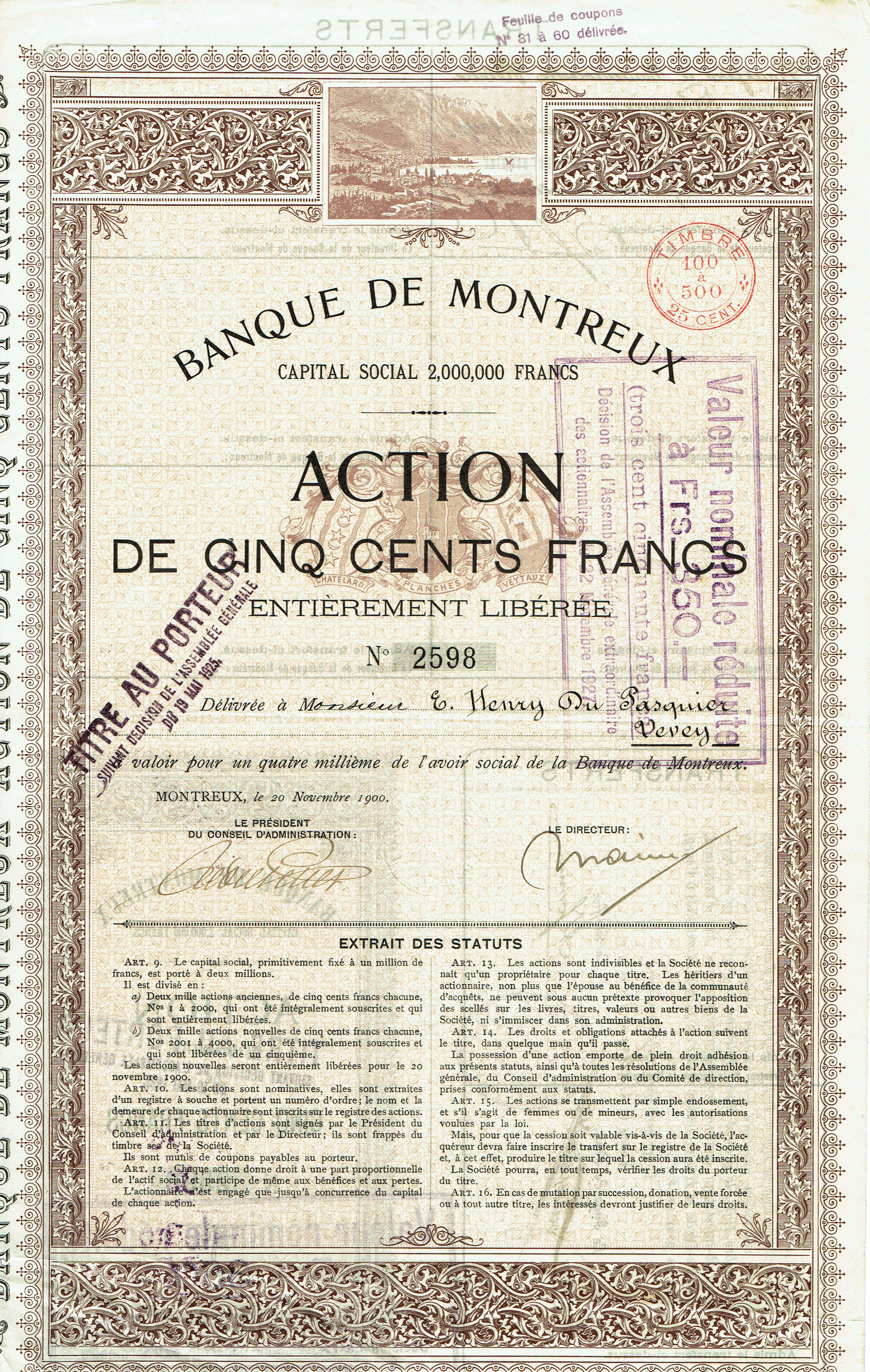
Share of the Banque de Montreux, issued 20 November 1900

The Banque de Montreux was a Swiss bank founded in 1868, which played a significant role in the development of tourism in the area around Lake Geneva. Originally it started with 85,000 Swiss francs, but by 1900 it had 2 million francs which then grew to 4 million francs by 1906.

However, with the advent of the First World War and its impact on tourism, the bank started to experience difficulties and was supported by the Banque Cantonale Vaudoise. These difficulties continued after the war although the tourist trade had started to pick up. The bank went through restructuring in 1925–26 with its capital being reduced from 6 million to 4.2 million francs. However, the 1931 Sterling crisis led to its final closure.
