= Sole proprietorship =

Business legally synonymous with its owner

A sole proprietorship, also known as a sole tradership, individual entrepreneurship or proprietorship, is a type of enterprise owned and run by only one person and in which there is no legal distinction between the owner and the business entity. A sole trader does not necessarily work alone and may employ other people.

The sole trader receives all profits (subject to taxation specific to the business) and has unlimited responsibility for all losses and debts. Every asset of the business is owned by the proprietor, and all debts of the business are those of the proprietor; the business is not a separate legal entity. The arrangement is a "sole" proprietorship in contrast with a partnership, which has at least two owners.

Sole proprietors may use a trade name or business name other than their legal name. They may have to trademark their business name if it differs from their own legal name, with the process varying depending upon country of residence.

== Advantages and disadvantages ==
Registration of a business name for a sole proprietor is not mandatory in many countries and is generally uncomplicated unless it involves the selection of a name that is fictitious or assumed. In many countries, the business owner is required to register with the appropriate local authorities, who will determine that the name submitted is not already in use by another business entity.

The owner may hire employees and enlist the services of independent consultants. Although an employee or consultant may be requested by the owner to complete a specific project or participate in the company's decision-making process, their contribution to the project or decision is considered a recommendation under the law. Under the legal doctrine of respondeat superior (Latin: "let the master answer"), the legal liability for any business decision arising from such a contribution remains with the owner and cannot be renounced or apportioned.

This is offset by the unlimited liability attached to a sole proprietary business. The owner carries the financial responsibility for all debts and losses suffered by the business, to the extent of using personal or other assets to discharge any outstanding liabilities. Thus, the owner of a sole proprietorship may be forced to use their personal holdings, such as their car, to pay the debts. The owner is exclusively liable for all business activities conducted by the sole proprietorship and is accordingly entitled to full control and all earnings associated with it.

== Rules for sole proprietorships in various countries ==
=== Netherlands ===
In the Netherlands, a sole trader can be categorized as a "ZZPer", and must register with the Chamber of Commerce and get a VAT ID. Not all ZZPers are sole traders. A ZZPer (meaning Zelfstandige Zonder Personeel or self-employed without staff) is an entrepreneur who does not employ any staff to run their business. A business can be a sole proprietorship and also employ staff in which case the entrepreneur does not qualify as a ZZPer.

=== Ireland ===
In Ireland, a sole trader who wishes to trade using a business name other than their true surname must register that name with the Companies Registration Office (CRO).

=== Malaysia ===
==== Registration of sole proprietorships ====
In Malaysia, there are three laws governing the registration and administration of sole proprietors:-

1. West Malaysia and the Federal Territory of Labuan: Registration of Business Act 1956 (Act 197);
2. Sarawak: Businesses, Professions and Trade Licensing Ordinance [Sarawak Chapter 33]; and Business Names Ordinance for the State of Sarawak [Sarawak Chapter 64] and
3. Sabah: Trades Licensing Ordinance for the State of Sabah [Sabah Chapter 144].

In West Malaysia, the registration of sole proprietors come under the purview of the Companies Commission of Malaysia (Suruhanjaya Syarikat Malaysia, abbreviated as SSM). In Sabah and Sarawak (with the exception of Kuching), the registrations of businesses are done at the local authorities (e.g. municipal councils or district offices), while in Kuching, sole proprietors are registered with the Kuching Office of the Malaysian Inland Revenue Board.

Sole proprietors, which includes the self-employed, must register with the relevant authority within thirty days from the commencement of their business. Sole proprietors may register their business using one of two names: their legal name following the registrant's identity card or a trade name. Registration of a business lasts for either one or two years, and must be renewed thirty days before its expiry.

In the event of termination of business, the proprietor has thirty days from the termination date to file the notice with the relevant authority. If the termination is caused by the death of the proprietor, the administrators of the estate have four months from the death date to file a notice of termination.

==== Goods and services tax (GST) ====
Sole proprietors must register with the Royal Malaysian Customs Department to charge and collect goods and services tax (GST) once their taxable turnover within a 12 month-period exceeds RM500,000.

==== Sole proprietors as employers ====
Similar to other Common Law jurisdiction, proprietors may enter into contracts of employment and/or apprenticeship with their employees. Sole proprietors, as employers are responsible to:

- Make contribution to their employees' Employees Provident Fund; and
- Pay contribution to their employees' Social Security.

==== Online businesses ====
In 2016, the SSM took legal action against 478 online businesses that had failed to register, whether as sole proprietors, partnerships, or private limited companies. As at May 12, 2017, a total of 50,882 online businesses have registered with the SSM since 2015.

=== New Zealand ===
Sole traders in New Zealand must notify the Inland Revenue Department that they are trading and must register for Goods and Services Tax purposes if their income exceeds $60,000 per year. Sole traders may obtain a unique New Zealand Business Number (NZBN), which any business in New Zealand can use to identify the business in commercial relationships and dealings with the government.

=== United Kingdom ===
A sole trader is the simplest type of business structure defined in UK law. It refers to an individual who owns their own business and retains all the profits from it. When starting up, sole traders must complete a straightforward registration with HM Revenue and Customs as self-employed for tax and National Insurance purposes. They are responsible for maintaining the business's records and submitting an annual tax return for all income from self-employment and other work. If revenue is expected to be more than £85,000 a year, they must also register for Value Added Tax. A sole trader can employ staff, but is personally responsible for any losses the business takes.

==== Advantages ====
Becoming a sole trader is relatively simple compared to other business structures. It can rapidly enable a business to begin trading; the requirements for record-keeping are far more straightforward than other business structures. Sole traders make all operational decisions and are solely responsible for raising business finance. They can invest their own capital into the business, or may be able to access business loans and/or overdrafts. Unlike limited companies or partnerships, it is not necessary to share decision-making or the profits.

==== Disadvantages ====
Unlike many other business entities, the sole proprietorship lacks a clear distinction between personal and business income. The business owner is personally liable for income tax and National Insurance contributions due on the business profits in each tax year. They are also personally liable for any debts the business incurs. Business analysts may advise sole traders to form a limited company in order to access greater levels of financing, for example for expansion plans. This can limit their personal liability, and business lenders may be more inclined to co-operate with a limited company. It can also be the case that within certain industries, it is easier to secure work if presenting potential business partners with a limited company structure.

=== United States ===
In the United States, there are no formalities that must be followed to start a sole proprietorship or commence business as a sole proprietor. However, depending upon the business activity of the sole proprietorship, sole proprietors may require licenses and permits in order to conduct business.

According to the Small Business Administration (SBA), a sole proprietor and their business are considered as one and the same; therefore, the business is not subjected to separate taxation and regarded as the direct income of the owner. Income, losses and expenses may be listed on a Schedule C, which is then transferred to the personal tax return of the owner. It is the responsibility of the owner to ensure all due income taxes and self-employment contributions are paid.

A permitted exception to the sole proprietor (single owner) stipulation is made by the Internal Revenue Service (IRS) permitting the spouse of a sole proprietor to work for the business. They are not classified as partners in the enterprise, or an independent contractor, enabling the business to retain its sole proprietorship status and not be required to submit a partnership income tax return. If an individual elects to incorporate as a Limited liability company but elects to be taxed as a Corporation, the IRS no longer recognizes the individual as a sole proprietorship.

==== Foundation and development ====
The setting-up process of a sole proprietorship to comply with local laws and regulations, is obtainable from the Small Business Development Center (SBDC), using their locator facility. A sole proprietor must be prepared to devote their time, utilizing business methods towards establishing a sound and appropriate foundation. Doing so may contribute to increased turnover, profits, minimize taxes, and avoid other potential adversities.

Sole owners are engaged in many varieties of industry and commerce, and a comprehensive list of the primary categories is found in the North American Industry Classification System (NAICS). The selection of a business type, by a new sole proprietor, is in many instances, motivated by appropriate business experience in a particular field, especially those pertaining to enterprises involving the marketing and selling of defined products and services.

A crucial component of a sole proprietorship within a business plan is the provision of an inherent guideline, for actions that require implementing for a business to achieve growth. The business name and products are critical aspects in the founding of a sole proprietorship and once selected, should be protected. In the event of a determined brand name being legalized, information regarding trademark protection is available from the U.S. Patent and Trademark Office.

==== Finance ====
For the sole proprietor, there are a variety of options in obtaining financial support for their business, including loan facilities available from the U.S. Small Business Administration. The loans are not originated by the SBA, but the administration does guarantee loans made by various independent lending institutions. The primary loan facility for small businesses offered by this agency is the 7(a) loan program, designed for general applications. Sole proprietors are able to finance legitimate operating expenses; for example, working capital, furniture, leasehold improvements and building renovations.

Many and varied private organizations and individuals seek opportunities to invest and fund a business that may not qualify for traditional financing from institutions, such as banks. For the sole proprietor seeking to take advantage of this facility, there are various factors that must be understood and adhered to regarding the loan application.

The Small Business Administration (SBA) advises that there are traditionally two forms of financing: debt and equity. For any small business owner seeking funding, they must consider the debt-to-equity ratio of their enterprise.

According to the SBA, there are various private organizations prepared to fund sole proprietor business operations that do not qualify for traditional financing from banks. These private investors can provide loans, credit lines, leasing facilities for equipment, or other forms of capital, to sole proprietorships that have exhausted alternative financial resources. It is also possible for these owners to obtain financing by way of business partners or others, with cash to invest. Financial partners are frequently "silent" and although they do not participate in any business related decisions, they generally receive a percentage of the profits, generated by the business.

To assist sole proprietors, there are business grants available from the Federal Government or private organizations, providing certain criteria are met. To qualify for Federal grants, small businesses must comply with determined business size and income standards. For consideration regarding various grant opportunities, sole proprietors may apply for a grant in their capacity as an individual. Local governments and state economic development agencies frequently make grants available, for businesses that stimulate their local economies.

For any sole proprietor applying for a loan, before starting the loan procedure, it is essential that their personal and business credit history is in order and up-to-date. A personal credit report should be obtained from a credit bureau; for example, Trans-Union, Equifax or Experian. This action should be initiated by a business owner well before starting the borrowing process. The Small Business Administration specifies that all credit reports received from any source should be carefully reviewed to ensure that all relevant personal information is correct. Other content in the report should also be examined particularly that related to the past credit obtained, from sources such as credit cards, mortgages, and student loans, as well as details pertaining to how the credit was repaid.

=== Other countries ===
An exact equivalent of "sole proprietorship" is often absent, because the focus of the concept can change. An example is the Brazilian concept of "sole business" that was split into two main kinds of formal freelancer:

- sole professional: with higher level academic certificate and regulations for formal control of autonomous exercise (e.g. sole doctor's office)
- sole entrepreneur: "little entrepreneurs", such as a craftsman, autonomous taxi driver, and many others, that can be formal. An informal freelancer, through a simple process, can be formalized as sole microentrepreneur.

German and Austrian tax laws also differentiate between sole professionals and other sole proprietors.
