= Enkeltpersonforetak =

Enkeltpersonforetak (ENK) is a type of sole proprietorship in Norway.

The company is considered part of the personal assets of the owner, who holds the full juridical and economic liability of the company. The sole proprietorship entity holds a number of advantages, such as that there is no minimum equity, requirements for auditing or registration fee at the Brønnøysund Register Centre. Sole proprietorships do not have to have the two or three letter corresponding company type in the official company name. Instead they are required to have the surname of the proprietor somewhere in the company name.
