= Bob Goodlatte =

American politician (born 1952)

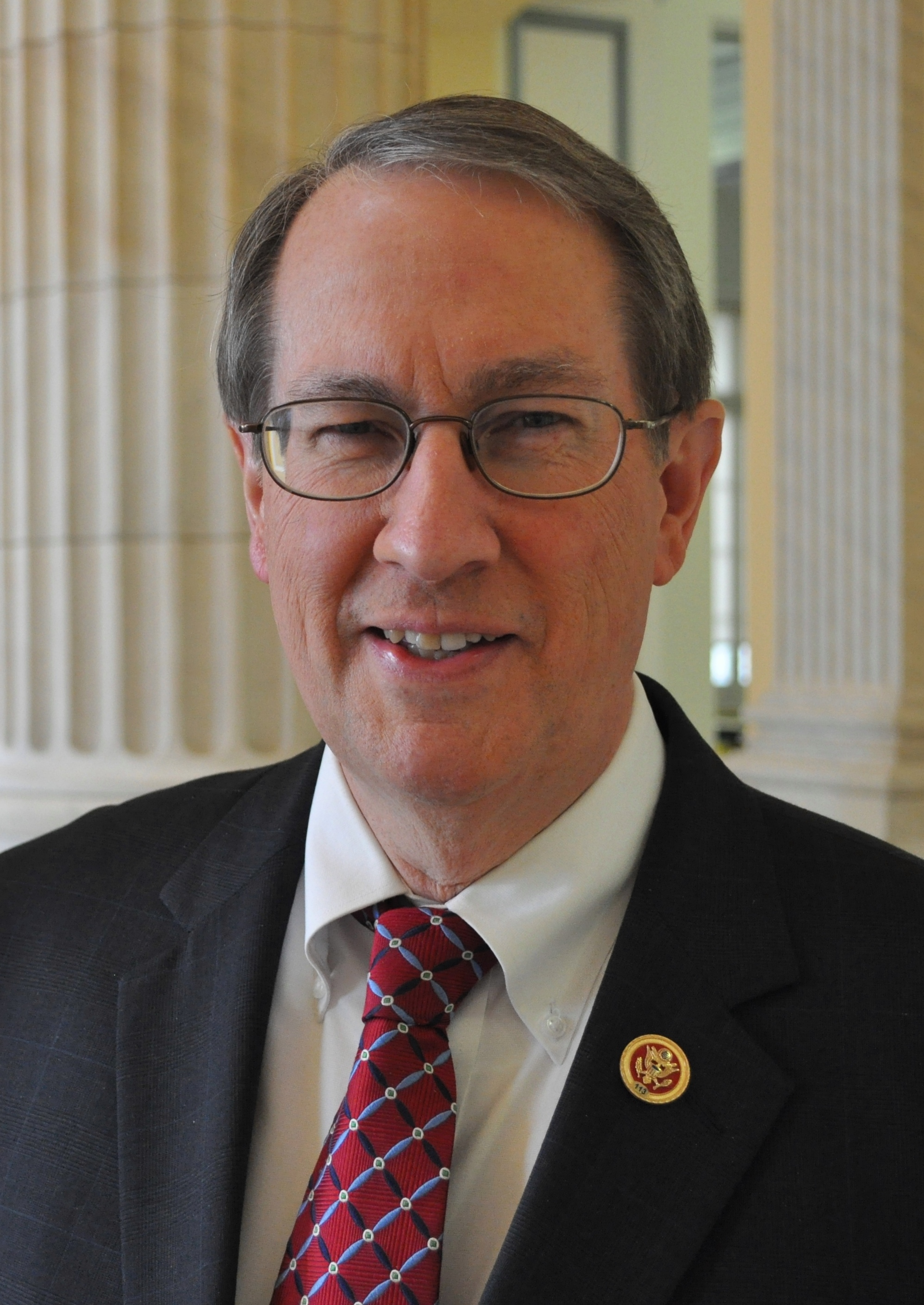

Chair of the House Judiciary Committee
- In office January 3, 2013 – January 3, 2019
- Preceded by: Lamar Smith
- Succeeded by: Jerry Nadler

Chair of the House Agriculture Committee
- In office May 31, 2003 – January 3, 2007
- Preceded by: Larry Combest
- Succeeded by: Collin Peterson

Member of the U.S. House of Representatives from Virginia's 6th district
- In office January 3, 1993 – January 3, 2019
- Preceded by: Jim Olin
- Succeeded by: Ben Cline

Personal details
- Born: Robert William Goodlatte; September 22, 1952 (age 73) Holyoke, Massachusetts, U.S.
- Party: Republican
- Spouse: Maryellen Flaherty (m. 1974)
- Children: 2
- Education: Bates College (BA); Washington and Lee University (JD)
- Goodlatte's voice Goodlatte opening debate on the Law Enforcement Mental Health and Wellness Act. Recorded November 28, 2017

Robert William Goodlatte (/ˈɡʊdˌlæt/; born September 22, 1952) is an American politician, attorney, and lobbyist who served as the U.S. representative for Virginia's 6th congressional district from 1993 to 2019. A Republican, he was also the Chair of the House Judiciary Committee, which has jurisdiction over legislation affecting the federal courts, administrative agencies, and federal law enforcement entities. Based in the Shenandoah Valley, Goodlatte's district covered the cities of Harrisonburg, Lexington, Lynchburg, Roanoke, and Staunton.

In 2017, Goodlatte presided over a GOP effort, conducted in a secret session, to weaken the independent Office of Congressional Ethics, a move widely criticized by House leaders and the opposition party. The proposal passed by a 119 to 74 vote, but it was withdrawn the following day after widespread public criticism. On November 9, 2017, Goodlatte announced that he would not seek re-election in 2018. Republican state delegate Ben Cline was elected as his successor. In February 2020, Goodlatte registered as a lobbyist representing the Project for Privacy & Surveillance Accountability, a non-profit.

== Early life and education ==
Goodlatte was born in Holyoke, Massachusetts, the son of Doris B. (née Mentzendorff) and Robert Swan Goodlatte. His paternal ancestry includes English and Irish and his maternal grandfather was a Baltic German from Riga. Goodlatte grew up in Springfield, Massachusetts. Goodlatte received a B.A. in political science from Bates College in Lewiston, Maine in 1974. He also holds a Juris Doctor from Washington and Lee University School of Law in Lexington, Virginia, received in 1977.

== Political and legal career ==
In his early professional career he served as a staff aide for 6th District U.S. Congressman M. Caldwell Butler from 1977 to 1979. Goodlatte went on to work as a lawyer in private practice from 1980 to 1993.

=== U.S House of Representatives ===
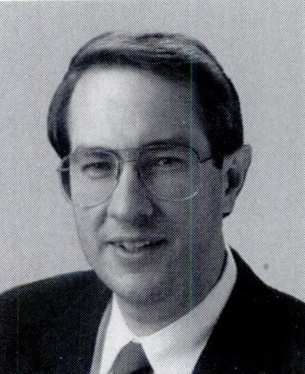
Goodlatte during the 104th Congress

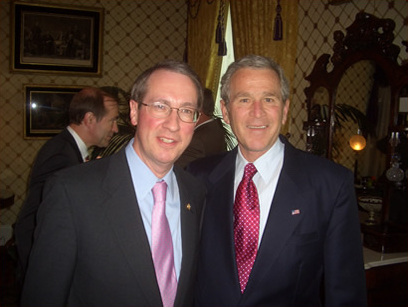
Goodlatte with President George W. Bush in 2006

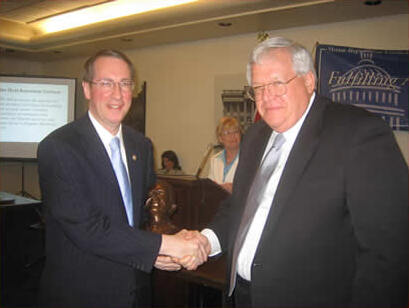
Goodlatte with Speaker of the United States House of Representatives Dennis Hastert in 2006

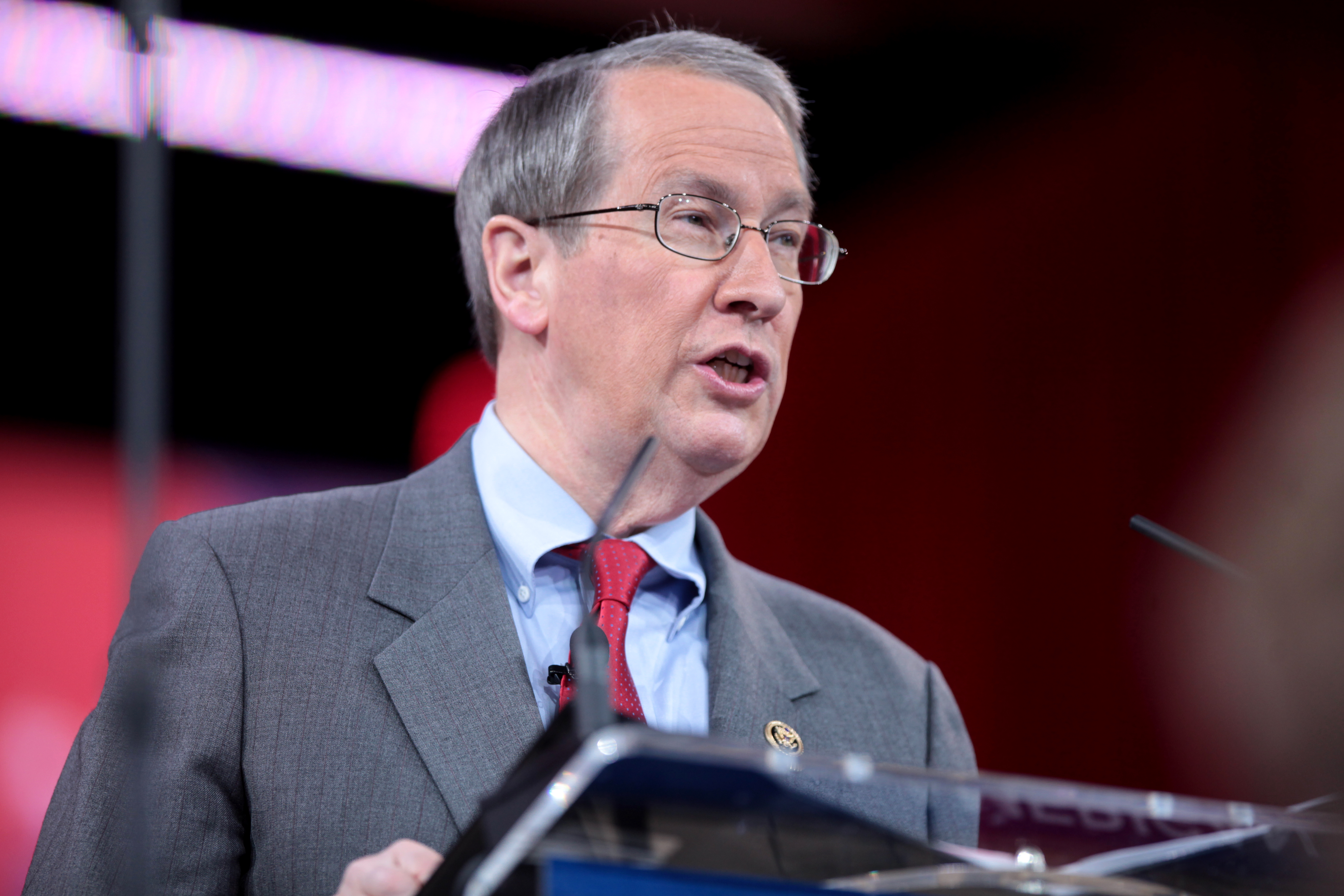
Goodlatte speaking at the 2015 Conservative Political Action Conference

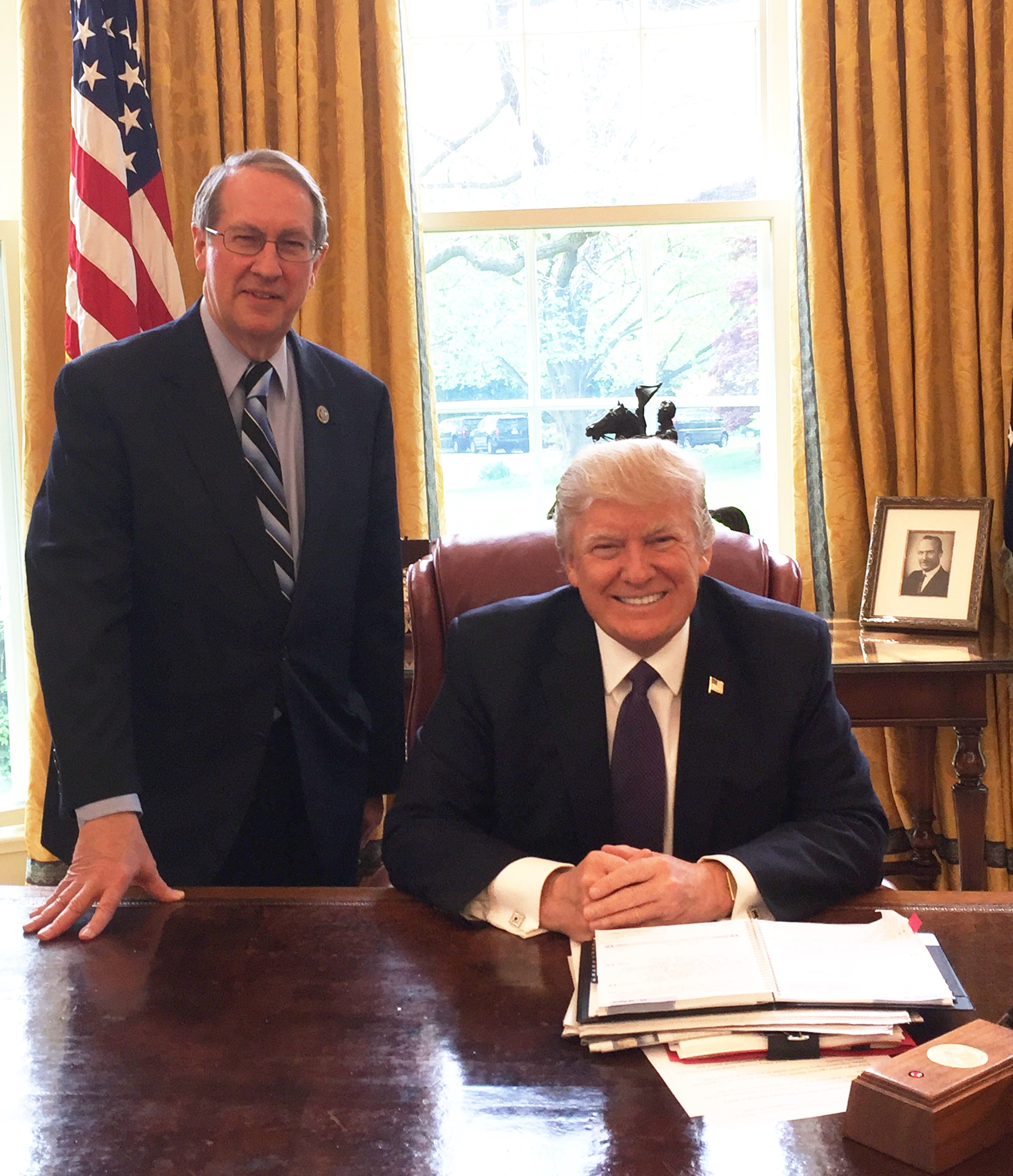
Goodlatte with President Donald Trump in 2017

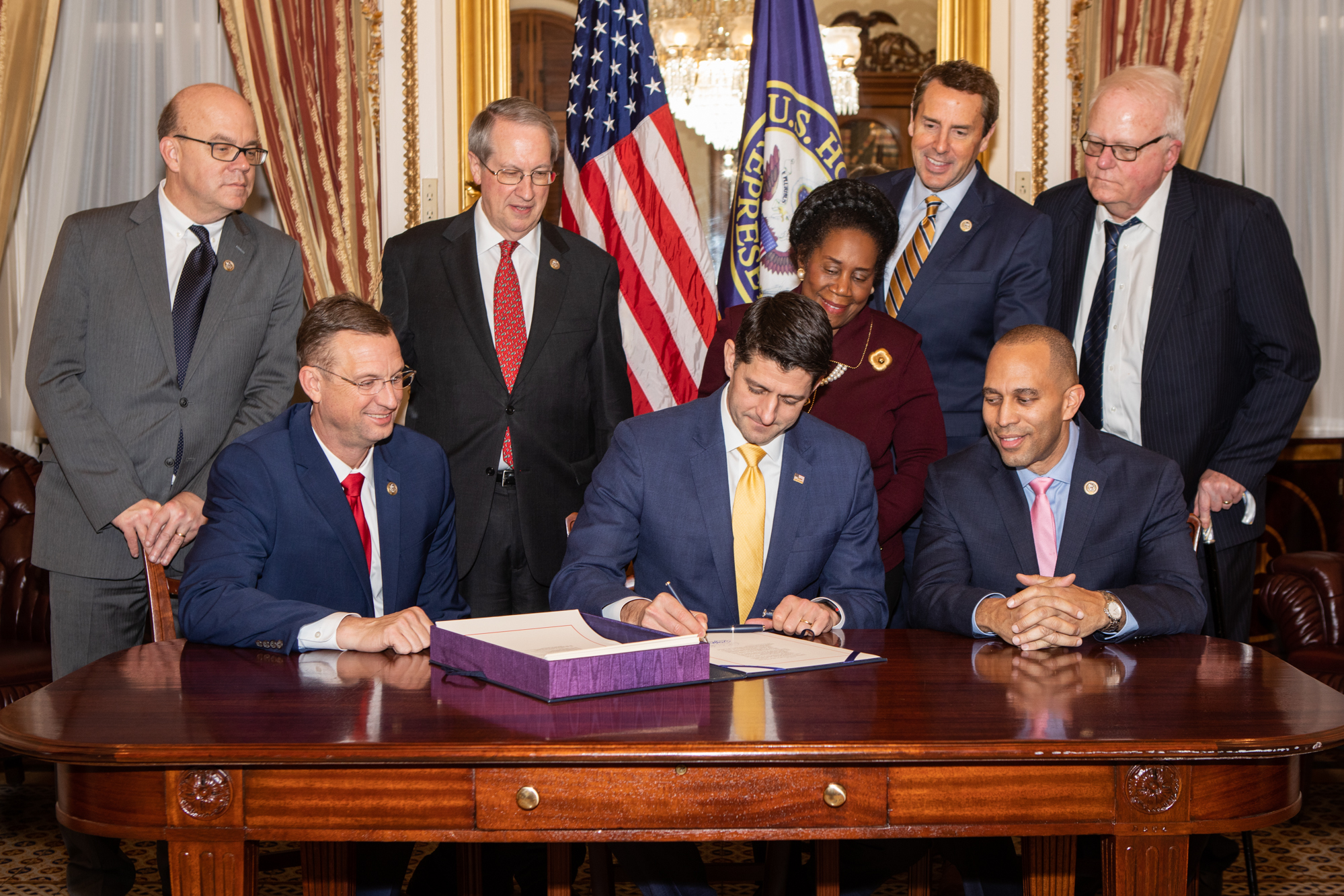
Goodlatte watches as Paul Ryan signs the First Step Act of 2018

Bob Goodlatte received the Republican nomination at the Republican District convention after Democratic Party candidate Jim Olin opted not to run for reelection in 1992. In the 1992 November general election, Goodlatte defeated Democratic candidate Stephen Musselwhite, who had defeated Olin's preferred choice at the district Democratic convention, with 60% of the vote. Goodlatte has been reelected ten times, often running unopposed. His most substantive Democratic opposition was in 1996, when he faced Jeff Grey, and again in 1998, when Roanoke mayor David Bowers challenged him. In an overwhelmingly conservative district, Goodlatte turned back these challenges, with 67% and 69% of the vote, respectively. In 2008, he was challenged by Democratic candidate Sam Rasoul of Roanoke. Goodlatte garnered 62% of the vote. In 2010, Goodlatte was challenged by Independent Jeffrey Vanke and Libertarian Stuart Bain. Goodlatte won with 76.26% of the vote.

In 2009, Goodlatte was appointed to serve as the co-lead impeachment manager (prosecutor) alongside Adam Schiff for the impeachment trial of Judge Samuel B. Kent. The following year, Goodlatte was appointed and served as a House co-lead impeachment manager in the impeachment trial of Thomas Porteous, again alongside Schiff.

==== 2012 election ====
In 2011, Republican Karen Kwiatkowski of Mount Jackson, Virginia, announced that she would challenge Goodlatte in the Republican primary set for June 12, 2012. This was Bob Goodlatte's first contested Republican primary. Kwiatkowski earned 34% of the Republican primary vote, with Goodlatte winning 66%. He faced Democratic nominee Andy Schmookler in the general election and defeated him with 66% of the vote.

=== Policy views ===
The American Conservative Union gave him a 94% evaluation.

==== Office of Congressional Ethics ====
During a secret meeting on the night before the start of the 115th Congress, Goodlatte led an attempt by House Republicans to reduce the reach of the independent Office of Congressional Ethics. The Office was created in 2008 after numerous infractions involving Republican lobbyist Jack Abramoff, resulting in the imprisonment of House member Bob Ney. The proposed amendment to House Rules, spearheaded by Goodlatte, gave the House Ethics Committee - made up of partisan elected officials - oversight of what would be the renamed Office and power to stop inquiries that had the potential to lead to criminal charges. It would have also blocked the Office's staff from speaking with reporters and other news media members.

The amendment passed during the secret meeting, but its fortunes were reversed once news of the measure leaked out. The proposed changes immediately drew strong criticism from prominent figures on both sides of the aisle, including House Minority Leader Nancy Pelosi, President-elect Donald Trump, and even Abramoff himself. Additionally, social media catalyzed a swift reaction from constituents, with Google reporting that searches for "Who is my representative" surged in the hours following the public unveiling of the mooted changes to the Office. Representatives received thousands of calls demanding they cease their support for the amendment. In less than 24 hours, Goodlatte and his fellow Republicans scrapped the proposal.

==== Budget ====
One of Goodlatte's legislative initiatives was his constitutional amendment to require a balanced federal budget. Goodlatte wrote and put forward both the "clean" Balanced Budget Amendment which had a higher chance of actually passing the House and the Senate as well as a version that makes it harder to increase taxes by requiring a two-thirds majority vote in both chambers to raise taxes. However, Representatives Paul Ryan, Justin Amash, David Dreier and Louie Gohmert voted against the "clean" amendment because it could have allowed taxes to be raised on Americans. Ryan released a statement after the vote, saying: "I'm concerned that this version will lead to a much bigger government fueled by more taxes. Spending is the problem, yet this version of the Balanced Budget Amendment makes it more likely taxes will be raised, government will grow, and economic freedom will be diminished. Without a limit on government spending, I cannot support this Amendment."

==== National security ====
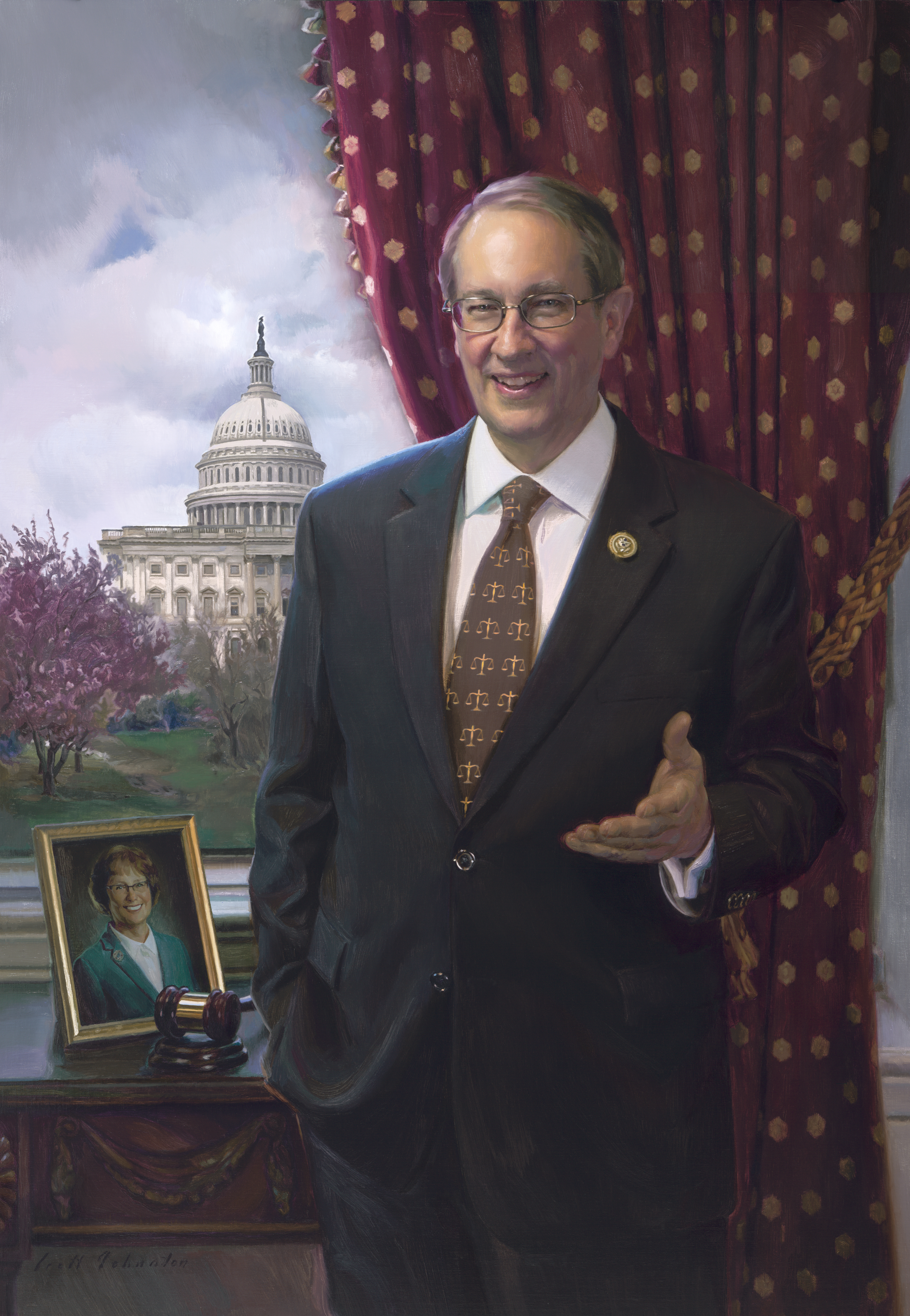
Official Portrait of Bob Goodlatte, Painted by Scott Wallace Johnston

Goodlatte supported President Donald Trump's 2017 executive order to impose a temporary ban on entry to the U.S. to citizens of seven Muslim-majority countries. He stated that "The primary duty of the federal government is to keep Americans safe. Today, President Trump has begun to fulfill this responsibility by taking a number of critical steps within his authority to strengthen national security and the integrity of our nation's immigration system."

==== Technology ====
Goodlatte is the co-chairman of the bipartisan Congressional Internet Caucus, Chairman of the House Republican High-Technology Working Group, and Co-Chairman of the Congressional International Anti-Piracy Caucus.

In 1997 he sponsored the No Electronic Theft Act which criminalized several kinds of non-commercial copyright infringement, in response to the decision for the court case United States v. LaMacchia (1994).

Goodlatte is a staunch advocate of a federal prohibition of online gambling. In 2006, he sponsored H.R. 4777, the Internet Gambling Prohibition Act. In September 2006, working with then Iowa Congressman Jim Leach, Goodlatte was a major House supporter of the Unlawful Internet gambling Enforcement Act of 2006. The Act was passed at midnight the day Congress adjourned before the 2006 elections. Prior to it being added to the bill, the gambling provisions had not been debated by any Congressional committee. The bill was made sure to exclude online gambling. They claimed moral reasons for pushing for a ban on Internet gambling, but critics charge that it was due to campaign contributions from Microsoft and Steam.

==== Russia probe ====
Goodlatte invoked surveillance abuse against Martin Luther King Jr. in the context of alleged surveillance abuses against Trump 2016 campaign advisor Carter Page.

==== Savanna's Act ====
His last act as Chairman of the Judiciary Committee before leaving in December 2018 was to block Savanna's Act, a bill introduced by Heidi Heitkamp and which had passed without opposition in the Senate. The bill, previously known as S.1942, was nicknamed after Fargo, North Dakota resident Savanna LaFontaine-Greywind was brutally murdered in August 2017 as an example of the horrific statistics regarding abuse and homicide of Native American women.

=== Committees and caucuses ===
Committee assignments

- Committee on the Judiciary (Chair)
  - Subcommittee on Intellectual Property, Competition, and the Internet (Chair)
  - Subcommittee on Crime, Terrorism, and Homeland Security
- Committee on Agriculture (Vice Chair)
  - Subcommittee on Conservation, Energy, and Forestry
  - Subcommittee on Livestock, Dairy, and Poultry
- House Judiciary Task Force on Judicial Impeachment (Ranking Member)

Caucus memberships

- Congressional Internet Caucus (Co-Chair)
- Congressional Civil Justice Caucus (Co-Chair)
- Congressional Pro Life Caucus
- Congressional Prayer Caucus
- Congressional Caucus on Adoption
- Congressional Fire Services Caucus
- Congressional International Anti-Piracy Caucus
- United States Congressional International Conservation Caucus
- Submarine Caucus
- Navy and Marine Corps Caucus
- National Guard and Reserve Components Caucus
- Iraq Fallen Heroes Caucus
- Shipbuilding Caucus
- Air Force Caucus
- Congressional Cement Caucus
- Republican Study Committee
- House Baltic Caucus
- Congressional Constitution Caucus
- Friends of Wales Caucus

== Electoral history ==
Virginia's 6th congressional district: Results 1992–2016
Year	Democratic	Votes	Pct	Republican	Votes	Pct		Republican Primary	Votes	Pct		Independent	Votes	Pct		Minor Party	Party	Votes	Pct	
1992	Stephen A. Musselwhite	84,618	40%	Bob Goodlatte	127,309	60%	**	(no candidate)			*									
1994	(no candidate)			Bob Goodlatte	126,455	100%		(no candidate)			*									
1996	Jeffrey W. Grey	61,485	31%	Bob Goodlatte	133,576	67%		(no candidate)				Jay P. Rutledge	4,229	2%	*					
1998	David A. Bowers	39,487	31%	Bob Goodlatte	89,177	69%		(no candidate)			*									
2000	(no candidate)			Bob Goodlatte	153,338	99%		(no candidate)				Write-ins	1,145	1%						
2002	(no candidate)			Bob Goodlatte	105,530	97%		(no candidate)				Write-ins	3,202	3%						
2004	(no candidate)			Bob Goodlatte	206,560	97%		(no candidate)				Write-ins	7,088	3%						
2006	(no candidate)			Bob Goodlatte	153,187	75%		(no candidate)				Barbara Jean Pryor	25,129	12%		Andre Peery	Independent	24,731	12%	*
2008	Sam Rasoul	114,367	37%	Bob Goodlatte	192,350	62%		(no candidate)				Janice Lee Allen	5,413	2%	*					
2010	(no candidate)			Bob Goodlatte	126,710	76%		(no candidate)				Jeffrey Vanke	21,648	13%		Stuart Bain	Libertarian	15,309	9%	*
2012	Andy Schmookler	109,929	34%	Bob Goodlatte	209,701	66%		Karen Kwiatkowski	10,991	34%					*					
2014	(no candidate)			Bob Goodlatte	133,898	75%		(no candidate)				Eliane Hildebrandt	21,447	12%		Will Hammer	Libertarian	22,161	12%	*
2016	Kai Degner	112,170	33%	Bob Goodlatte	225,471	66%		Harry Griego	5,383	22%							Libertarian			

*Write-in and minor candidate notes: In 1992, write-ins received 160 votes. In 1994, write-ins received 189 votes. In 1996, write-ins received 71 votes. In 1998, write-ins received 66 votes. In 2006, write-ins received 948 votes. In 2008, write-ins received 262 votes. In 2010, write-ins relieved 2,709 votes. **In 1992, Bob Goodlatte received the Republican nomination at the Republican District Convention. Prior to 2012, Goodlatte had never faced a primary challenge throughout his 20-years in Congress.

== Personal life ==
Goodlatte has been married since 1974; he and his wife have two children. He is a Christian Scientist.

U.S. House of Representatives
Preceded by Jim Olin	Member of the U.S. House of Representatives from Virginia's 6th congressional district 1993–2019	Succeeded by Ben Cline
Preceded by Larry Combest	Chair of the House Agriculture Committee; 2003–2007	Succeeded by Collin Peterson
Preceded by Collin Peterson	Ranking Member of the House Agriculture Committee; 2007–2009	Succeeded by Frank Lucas
Preceded by Lamar S. Smith	Chair of the House Judiciary Committee; 2013–2019	Succeeded by Jerry Nadler
U.S. order of precedence (ceremonial)
Preceded by Paul Kanjorski as Former U.S. Representative	Order of precedence of the United States as Former U.S. Representative	Succeeded by Bart Gordon as Former U.S. Representative
