= Criminal remedies for copyright infringement =

Remedies for copyright infringement in the United States can be either civil or criminal in nature. Criminal remedies for copyright infringement prevent the unauthorized use of copyrighted works by defining certain violations of copyright to be criminal wrongs which are liable to be prosecuted and punished by the state. Unlike civil remedies, which are obtained through private civil actions initiated by the owner of the copyright, criminal remedies are secured by the state which prosecutes the infringing individual or organisation.

The criminal penalties imposed for copyright infringement vary between the copyright laws of different jurisdictions. However, the justifications for the imposition of criminal penalties are common in the sense that certain kinds of copyright violations are considered as egregious enough to warrant state interference. These kinds of copyright violations are seen as having a negative consequence affecting the entire community. A criminal conviction for copyright infringement is also more punitive compared to a civil penalty and this increases the value of the punishment as a deterrent to prevent such violations in the future. For these reasons, criminal penalties for copyright infringement are considered to be effective sanctions against violations.

Internationally, Article 61 of the TRIPS Agreement requires member nations to provide for criminal procedures and penalties "at least in cases of wilful trademark counterfeiting or copyright piracy on a commercial scale". In addition to the coming into force of the TRIPS Agreement, the rapid development of computer software during the 1990s led to a significant expansion in the degree and imposition of criminal penalties for copyright infringement, especially in the decades towards the end of the 20th century. The scope for copyright infringement of electronic material has proliferated following the advent of the Internet and this has become an underpinning reason for calls by copyright owners to increase reliance on criminal penalties which have a deterrent effect. Nevertheless, there have also been arguments by scholars for reducing the severity of criminal copyright infringement penalties since such penalties could result in monopolistic profits for the copyright owner.

== In the U.S. ==
=== Legislative history ===
Criminal provisions for copyright infringement were initially inserted into U.S. Copyright Law in 1897. But this crime was limited only to unlawful performances or representations of copyrighted dramatic works or musical compositions. The apparent reasoning behind such a narrow criminal provision was because of the difficulty faced by copyright owners of such works in detecting and punishing infringements of their works since these infringements were perpetrated by "hit and run" performing groups in remote areas far away from the location of the copyright owner's place of residence or work. The criminal intent or mens rea that is required to be shown in case of any criminal offence of copyright infringement was also provided for in the 1897 law and it had to be shown that the conduct of the infringing party was both "wilful" and "for profit."

The U.S. Congress expanded the scope of the criminal remedies in the Copyright Act of 1909 by applying criminal provisions to infringements of all kinds of copyrighted works under the statute except sound recordings. Once again, the mens rea requirement for conviction of a criminal offence necessitated that the infringement was done "wilfully" and "for profit." This confined most criminal convictions to large-scale commercial activities. Additionally, any person who "knowingly and wilfully" aided or abetted such infringement was also criminally liable under the statute. The criminal offences under the Copyright Act of 1909 were punishable as misdemeanours and entailed either imprisonment or fines at the discretion of the court. The criminal provisions under the old copyright law were interpreted rather generously by the judiciary and the evidentiary requirement of "for profit" was glossed over to mean that the infringing defendant's activities only needed to be for "the purpose" of profit and no actual generation of profits was necessary. Subsequently, in 1971, following lobbying by the sound recording industry, the U.S. Congress extended federal copyright protection to sound recordings as well vide the Sound Recording Act of 1971. This consequently led to criminal penalties being made available against wilful and for-profit infringement of sound recordings.

=== Existing criminal copyright law ===
The criminal remedies for copyright infringement in the U.S. have been increasingly expanded in both scope and degree by legislative measures following the software and digital revolution beginning in the early 1990s.

==== U.S. Copyright Act of 1976 ====
In 1976, the U.S. Congress carried out, till date, the most recent general revision of the U.S. copyright law and the Copyright Act of 1976 was brought into force. The Copyright Act of 1976 is the copyright law currently in force in the U.S. While this Act continued to provide for criminal remedies to copyright infringement, it removed the crime of aiding or abetting such infringement which had been included in the 1909 statute. The mens rea requirement was also amended. Previously, under the 1909 statute, a person was criminally liable for copyright infringement if he or she committed the infringement "wilfully" and "for profit". While "wilful" commission of the infringement continued to remain a requirement for proving mens rea, the words "for profit" were amended to read as "for purposes of commercial advantage or private financial gain."

Section 506(a) of the U.S. Copyright Act, 1976 (Title 17 of the U.S. Code) defines the offence of criminal infringement. However, the punishments prescribed for criminal copyright infringements are laid down under Section 2319 of Title 18 of the U.S. Code (Crimes and Criminal Procedure). This segregation initially came about in 1982 following representations by the Motion Picture Association of America, Inc. and the Recording Industry Association of America, Inc. that called for an increase in penalties for film and sound recording piracy and counterfeiting. These two trade associations asserted that civil infringement actions had little to no effect in deterring criminals engaged in piracy and counterfeiting activities of motion pictures and sound recordings and, moreover, that the modest penalties imposed for criminal infringement discouraged efforts to enforce the same. The U.S. Congress responded to these industrial copyright concerns by restructuring the criminal remedies for copyright infringement and by enacting certain felony provisions for copyright infringement under Section 2319 of Title 18 of the U.S. Code. These criminal copyright infringement provisions have been periodically amended in line with current developments and now encompass all copyrighted works. Most notably, Section 2319 of U.S.C. Title 18 was significantly amended by the Copyright Felony Act of 1992 which imposed felony penalties for mass piracy of all types of copyrighted works including computer programs while simultaneously lowering the threshold for imposing felony penalties. The criminal penalties under Section 2319 of 18 U.S.C. consist of substantially prohibitive sanctions comprising either imprisonment or fines or both. Section 506(b) also provides for the criminal forfeiture of the infringing property and subsequent destruction of the same at the conclusion of the forfeiture proceedings.

==== Notable Amendments to the U.S. Copyright Act of 1976 ====
===== No Electronic Theft Act of 1997 =====
The No Electronic Theft (NET) Act was enacted by the U.S. Congress and came into effect in 1997. This Act amended Section 506 of the U.S. Copyright Act and the corresponding sections of the federal criminal code (Title 18 of the U.S. Code) in order to prohibit large-scale copyright infringement through the Internet. The NET Act revised Section 506 in order to close the "LaMacchia Loophole" which had emerged following the decision of the United States District Court for the District of Massachusetts in the case of United States v. LaMacchia in 1994. Prior to the enactment of the NET Act, the law required that, in order to prosecute for criminal copyright infringement, the infringement be carried out for the purpose of commercial advantage or private financial gain. In the LaMacchia decision, the district court cast doubt on the effectiveness of the law by ruling that the commission of copyright infringement for non-commercial motives cannot be prosecuted under criminal copyright law. The NET Act removed this loophole by defining the term "financial gain" to include "the receipt of anything of value, including the receipt of other copyrighted works" and enabling prosecutors to pursue criminal infringement suits against infringers even in the absence of any private financial gain provided that the reproduction or distribution (even through electronic means) of the copies of the copyrighted works have a total retail value of more than $1000.

===== Digital Millennium Copyright Act of 1998 =====
In 1998, the U.S. Congress adopted the Digital Millennium Copyright Act (DMCA) which introduced criminal anti-circumvention provisions to prevent copyright infringement. This Act was enacted to implement the provisions of the WIPO Copyright Treaty and the WIPO Performances and Phonograms Treaty in the U.S. and to prevent circumvention of Digital Rights Management systems. Section 1204 of the U.S. Copyright Act imposes serious criminal penalties on persons who wilfully and for purposes of commercial advantage or private financial gain, circumvent technological protection measures or traffic in any such circumvention technology. The DMCA distinguishes between first-time offenders and repeat offenders and the criminal sanctions that can be imposed are either imprisonment or fines, or both.

===== Intellectual Property Protection and Courts Amendments Act of 2004 =====
The U.S. Congress adopted the Intellectual Property Protection and Courts Amendments Act (also known as the Anti-Counterfeiting Amendments Act) in 2004. This law expanded criminal penalties to criminalize trafficking of counterfeit copyrighted works. The criminal remedies available under the Act include imprisonment for a term of not more than five years or a fine or both.

===== Family Entertainment and Copyright Act of 2005 =====
In 2005, the U.S. Congress adopted the Family Entertainment and Copyright Act which criminally penalised the wilful reproduction of works for commercial distribution. More specifically, it prohibited the recording of copyrighted audiovisual works like movies without the prior permission of the copyright owner from the public performance of such works in a theatre or other similar facility. This Act distinguishes between first-time offenders and repeat offenders and the criminal sanctions include a fine and/or imprisonment.

===== Prioritizing Resources and Organization for Intellectual Property Act of 2008 (Pro-IP Act) =====
The Pro-IP Act, adopted by the U.S. Congress in 2008, markedly amended the U.S. copyright law concerning criminal remedies by converting to felonies many copyright infringement offences that were previously considered misdemeanours. This enhanced the criminal sanctions for infringements classified as felony offences.

== In India ==
Chapter XIII (Sections 63 to 70) of the Indian Copyright Act of 1957 addresses the subject of criminal offences for copyright violations in India.

Section 63 of the Indian Copyright Act is the primary provision imposing criminal sanctions for copyright infringement or the violation of any other right conferred under the Indian Copyright Act. The mens rea requirement under the Indian law states that a person must "knowingly" infringe or abet the infringement of a copyrighted work. In contrast to the U.S. Copyright Act which removed criminal sanctions for abetting copyright infringement, a person who abets another in the infringement of a copyrighted work under the Indian copyright law is liable to criminal sanctions as per Section 63.

A crucial difference between the Indian copyright law and the U.S. copyright law is that the Indian law prescribes both imprisonment and fine to be imposed by the court in case of a criminal copyright offences whereas the U.S. law allows the court to impose imprisonment and/or a fine. The Indian legislative policy regarding criminal copyright violations appears to favour imprisonment as a mandatory criminal sanction for copyright offences. However, the proviso to Section 63 allows the court to impose a lower punishment with regard to the term of imprisonment and the amount of fine if the infringement was not made for gain the course of trade or business. Section 63A of the Indian Copyright Act prescribes an enhanced penalty for repeat offenders of copyright infringement.

There has, however, been slight disagreement between the High Courts in India regarding question of whether a criminal offence is bailable or is non-bailable. The Delhi High Court and the Andhra Pradesh High Court have held that offences under Section 63 and 63A are bailable. But, the Gauhati High Court has stated such criminal offences to be non-bailable. Furthermore, the Kerala High Court has held criminal offences under Section 63 to be cognizable in nature, meaning that a police officer may arrest an accused without a warrant for the alleged commission of a criminal offence under the Indian Copyright Act.

Section 63B of the Indian Copyright Act was inserted by the Copyright (Amendment) Act of 1994 and it classifies the knowing use of an infringing copy of a computer programme by any person as an offence which is punishable with both fine as well as imprisonment. Where the computer programme has not been used for gain or in the course of trade or business, the court may, after recording its reasons, not impose any sentence of imprisonment and can reduce the amount of the minimum fine prescribed.

Section 64 of the Indian Copyright Act affords power to a police officer, who is above or at the rank of a sub-inspector, to seize without warrant any infringing copies of copyrighted material if he or she believes that an offence under Section 63 is being, or is likely to be, committed. The constitutional validity of the power afforded to a police officer by this provision was upheld by the Rajasthan High Court in Girish Gandhi v. Union of India.

Cognizance of offences under the Indian Copyright Act can only be taken by a Court of a Metropolitan Magistrate or a Judicial Magistrate of the first class.

=== Digital Rights Management provisions under the Indian copyright law ===
The Indian Copyright Act has two provisions to prevent circumvention of Digital Rights Management (DRM) systems. Sections 65A and 65B were both inserted following the Copyright (Amendment) Act of 2012. Section 65A deals with the protection of technological measures and imposes criminal sanctions on any person who circumvents an effective technological measure with the intention of infringing any of the rights conferred by the Indian Copyright Act. Note that Section 65A requires the mens rea element of "intention" to be shown and proved for a conviction under the said Section. This is a fairly high bar for conviction which is in contradistinction to the U.S. Copyright Act (as amended by the DMCA) which does not require proof of "intention" in case of a circumvention of a technological measure by any person. The DMCA effectively classifies this kind of an offence as a strict liability offence. Compared to the DMCA, the exceptions under the Indian Copyright Act are also much broader since:

1. Section 65A does not prohibit any person from doing anything for a purpose not expressly prohibited under the Indian Copyright Act;
2. Section 65A allows third parties to facilitate circumvention of a technological protection measure provided that the third party maintains a complete record of the details and the purpose for which such circumvention was facilitated; and
3. It specifically exempts from criminal liability the circumvention of technological measures for the purpose of certain activities as listed under Section 65A.

Section 65B addresses the issue of protection of Right Management Information and imposes a criminal sanction consisting of both imprisonment as well as fine on any person who knowingly commits such offence. The criminal penalties provided for under this section are in addition to the civil remedies provide for under Chapter XII of the Act.

The DRM provisions introduced by the 2012 Amendment of the Indian Copyright Act have been criticised by certain commentators since India is not a party to either the WIPO Copyright Treaty or the WIPO Performances and Phonograms Treaty and had no obligation to enact such provisions. In effect, these two provisions have been criticised for creating a para-copyright regime which affords greater protection to DRM-protected works while detrimentally affecting the fair dealing defence available to the general public under Section 52 of the Indian Copyright Act.
