= Copyright infringement =

Illegal usage of copyrighted works

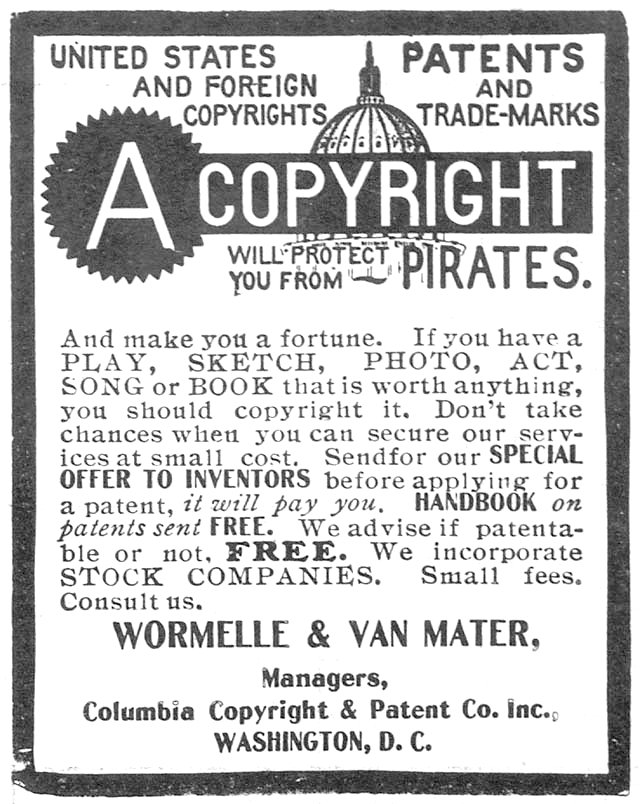
An advertisement for copyright and patent preparation services from 1906, when copyright registration formalities were still required in the US

Copyright infringement (sometimes referred to as piracy) is the use of works protected by copyright without permission for usage where such permission is required, thereby infringing certain exclusive rights granted to the copyright holder, such as the right to reproduce, distribute, display or perform the protected work, or to produce derivative works. The copyright holder is usually the work's creator, or a publisher or other business to whom copyright has been assigned. Copyright holders routinely invoke legal and technological measures to prevent and penalize copyright infringement.

Copyright infringement disputes are usually resolved through direct negotiation, a notice and take down process, or litigation in civil court. Egregious or large-scale commercial infringement, especially when it involves counterfeiting, or the fraudulent imitation of a product or brand, is sometimes subject to criminal penalties.

Estimates of the actual economic impact of copyright infringement vary widely and depend on other factors. Nevertheless, copyright holders, industry representatives, and legislators have long characterized copyright infringement as piracy or theft – language which some US courts now regard as pejorative or otherwise contentious.

== Terminology ==
The terms piracy and theft are often associated with copyright infringement. The original meaning of piracy is "robbery or illegal violence at sea", but the term has been in use for centuries as a synonym for acts of copyright infringement. Theft, meanwhile, emphasises the potential commercial harm of infringement to copyright holders. However, copyright is a type of intellectual property, an area of law distinct from that which covers robbery or theft, offences related only to tangible property. Not all copyright infringement results in commercial loss, and the US Supreme Court ruled in 1985 that infringement does not easily equate with theft.

This was taken further in the case MPAA v. Hotfile, where Judge Kathleen M. Williams granted a motion to deny the MPAA the usage of words whose appearance was primarily "pejorative". This list included the word "piracy", the use of which, the motion by the defence stated, serves no court purpose but to misguide and inflame the jury.

=== "Piracy" ===
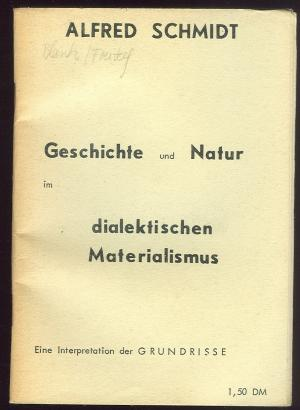
Pirated edition of German philosopher Alfred Schmidt (Amsterdam, c. 1970)

The term "piracy" has been used to refer to the unauthorized copying, distribution and selling of works in copyright. In 1668, publisher John Hancock wrote of "some dishonest Booksellers, called Land-Pirats, who make it their practice to steal Impressions of other mens Copies" in the work A String of Pearls: or, The Best Things Reserved till Last by Thomas Brooks. Over time the metaphor mostly used in the book-trade became more common, such that the use of the word 'pirate' itself to describe unauthorised publishing of books was attested to in Nathan Bailey's 1736 dictionary An Universal Etymological English Dictionary:

One who lives by pillage and robbing on the sea. Also a plagiary.

The practice of labelling the infringement of exclusive rights in creative works as "piracy" predates statutory copyright law. Before the Statute of Anne in 1710, the Stationers' Company of London in 1557 received a royal charter giving the company a monopoly on publication and tasking it with enforcing the charter. Article 61 of the 1994 Agreement on Trade-Related Aspects of Intellectual Property Rights (TRIPs) requires criminal procedures and penalties in cases of "willful trademark counterfeiting or copyright piracy on a commercial scale." Piracy traditionally refers to acts of copyright infringement intentionally committed for financial gain, though more recently, copyright holders have described online copyright infringement, particularly in relation to peer-to-peer file sharing networks, as "piracy".

Richard Stallman and the GNU Project have criticized the use of the word "piracy" in these situations, saying that publishers use the word to refer to "copying they don't approve of" and that "they [publishers] imply that it is ethically equivalent to attacking ships on the high seas, kidnapping and murdering the people on them."

=== "Theft" ===
A common explanation for why copyright infringement is not theft is that the original copyright holder still possesses the work they made, unlike the theft of an object.

Copyright holders frequently refer to copyright infringement as theft, "although such misuse has been rejected by legislatures and courts". The slogan "Piracy is theft" was used beginning in the 1980s, and is still being used. In copyright law, infringement does not refer to theft of physical objects that take away the owner's possession, but an instance where a person exercises one of the exclusive rights of the copyright holder without authorization. Courts have distinguished between copyright infringement and theft. For instance, the United States Supreme Court held in Dowling v. United States (1985) that bootleg phonorecords did not constitute stolen property. Instead,

interference with copyright does not easily equate with theft, conversion, or fraud. The Copyright Act even employs a separate term of art to define one who misappropriates a copyright: '[...] an infringer of the copyright.'

The court said that in the case of copyright infringement, the province guaranteed to the copyright holder by copyright law – certain exclusive rights – is invaded, but no control, physical or otherwise, is taken over the copyright, nor is the copyright holder wholly deprived of using the copyrighted work or exercising the exclusive rights held.

=== "Freebooting" ===
The term "freebooting" has been used to describe the unauthorized copying of online media, particularly videos, on social media websites. The word itself had already been in use since the 16th century, referring to pirates, and meant "looting" or "plundering". This new form of the word referring to copying social media – a portmanteau of "freeloading" and "bootlegging" – was suggested by YouTuber and podcaster Brady Haran in the podcast Hello Internet. Haran advocated the term in an attempt to find a phrase more emotive than "copyright infringement", yet more appropriate than "theft".

== Motivation ==
Some of the motives for engaging in copyright infringement are the following:

- Pricing – unwillingness or inability to pay the price requested by the legitimate sellers
- Testing and evaluation – trying before paying for something that may be bad value
- Unavailability – no legitimate sellers providing the product in the language or country of the end-user: not yet launched there, already withdrawn from sales, never to be sold there, geographical restrictions on online distribution and international shipping
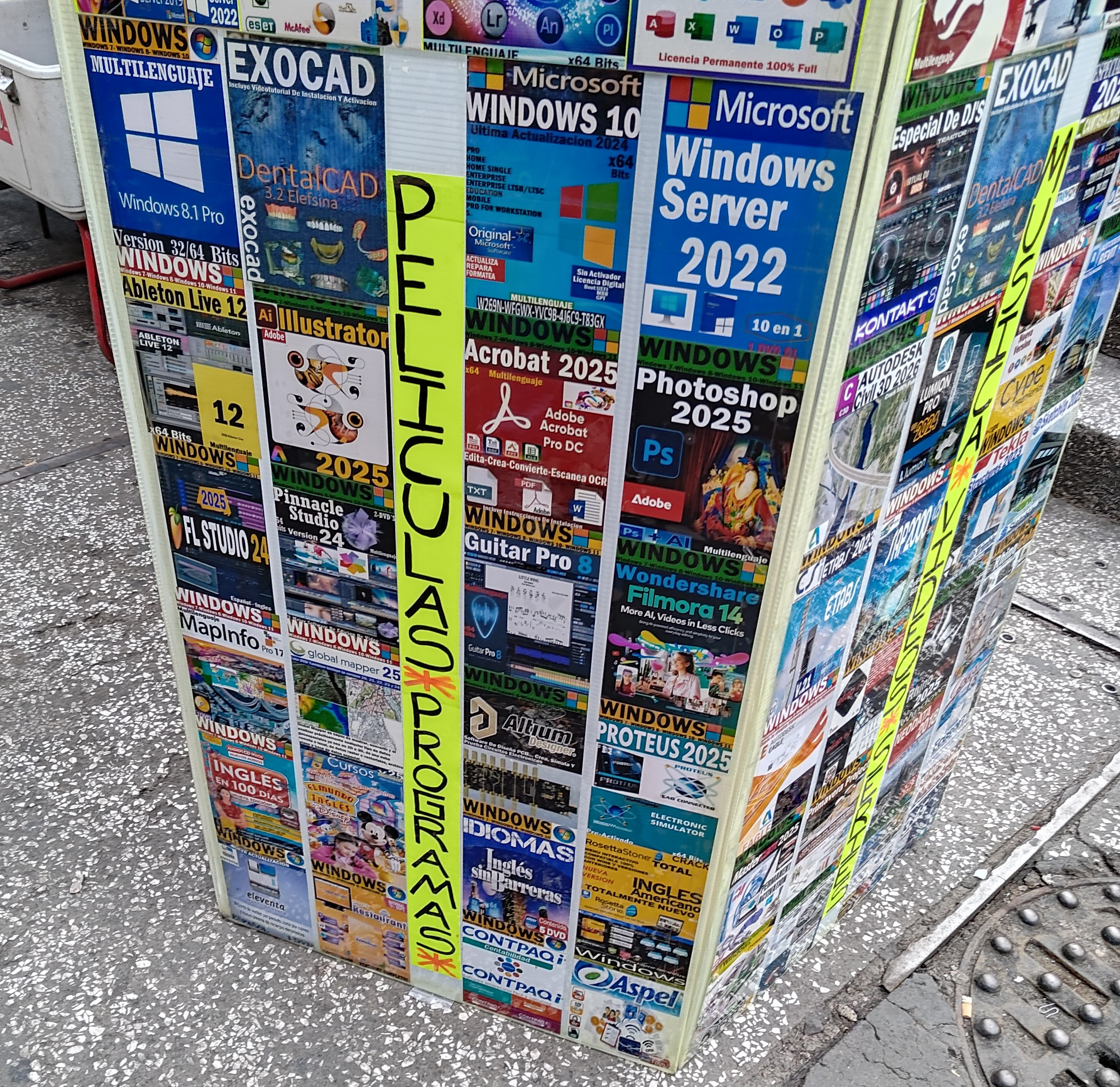
- A variety of applications being sold on the street. Most of the software is aimed at small companies or offices. Illicit copies of high-value software are sought after by businesses seeking to cut costs.
  Usefulness – the legitimate product comes with various means (DRM, region lock, DVD region code, Blu-ray region code) of restricting legitimate use (backups, usage on devices of different vendors, offline usage) or comes with non-skippable advertisements and anti-piracy disclaimers, which are removed in the unauthorized product, making it more desirable for the end-user
- Shopping experience – no legitimate sellers providing the product with the required quality through online distribution and through a shopping system with the required level of user-friendliness
- Anonymity – downloading works does not require identification whereas downloads directly from the website of the copyright owner often require a valid email address and/or other credentials
- Freedom of information – Some people engage in copyright infringement due to opposition to copyright law or a belief that certain information should be freely accessible.
- Protest/boycotting - Infringement can be used to protest against specific companies they disagree with. A person may pirate a company to avoid giving money to a company as a way to voice disapproval of their business practices or perceived greed especially if they want or need the copyrighted work but do not want to support them. Others use copyrighted art without permission to create protest arts for social movements or political commentary.

Sometimes only partial compliance with licence agreements is the cause. For example, in 2013, the United States Army settled a lawsuit with Texas-based company Apptricity which makes software that allows the army to track its soldiers in real time. In 2004, the US Army paid the company a total of $4.5 million for a licence of 500 users while allegedly installing the software for more than 9000 users; the case was settled for US$50 million. Major anti-piracy organizations, like the BSA, conduct software licensing audits regularly to ensure full compliance.

Cara Cusumano, director of the Tribeca Film Festival, stated in April 2014: "Piracy is less about people not wanting to pay and more about just wanting the immediacy – people saying, 'I want to watch Spiderman right now' and downloading it". The statement occurred during the third year that the festival used the Internet to present its content, while it was the first year that it featured a showcase of content producers who work exclusively online. Cusumano further explained that downloading behaviour is not merely conducted by people who merely want to obtain content for free:

I think that if companies were willing to put that material out there, moving forward, consumers will follow. It's just that [consumers] want to consume films online and they're ready to consume films that way and we're not necessarily offering them in that way. So it's the distribution models that need to catch up. People will pay for the content.

In response to Cusumano's perspective, Screen Producers Australia executive director Matt Deaner clarified the motivation of the film industry: "Distributors are usually wanting to encourage cinema-going as part of this process [of monetizing through returns] and restrict the immediate access to online so as to encourage the maximum number of people to go to the cinema." Deaner further explained the matter in terms of the Australian film industry, stating: "there are currently restrictions on quantities of tax support that a film can receive unless the film has a traditional cinema release."

In a study published in the Journal of Behavioural and Experimental Economics, and reported on in early May 2014, researchers from the University of Portsmouth in the UK discussed findings from examining the illegal downloading behavior of 6,000 Finnish people, aged seven to 84. The list of reasons for downloading given by the study respondents included money saving; the ability to access material not on general release, or before it was released; and assisting artists to avoid involvement with record companies and movie studios.

In a public talk between Bill Gates, Warren Buffett, and Brent Schlender at the University of Washington in 1998, Bill Gates commented on piracy as a means to an end, whereby people who use Microsoft software illegally will eventually pay for it, out of familiarity, as a country's economy develops and legitimate products become more affordable to businesses and consumers:

Although about three million computers get sold every year in China, people don't pay for the software. Someday they will, though. And as long as they're going to steal it, we want them to steal ours. They'll get sort of addicted, and then we'll somehow figure out how to collect sometime in the next decade.

=== Developing world ===
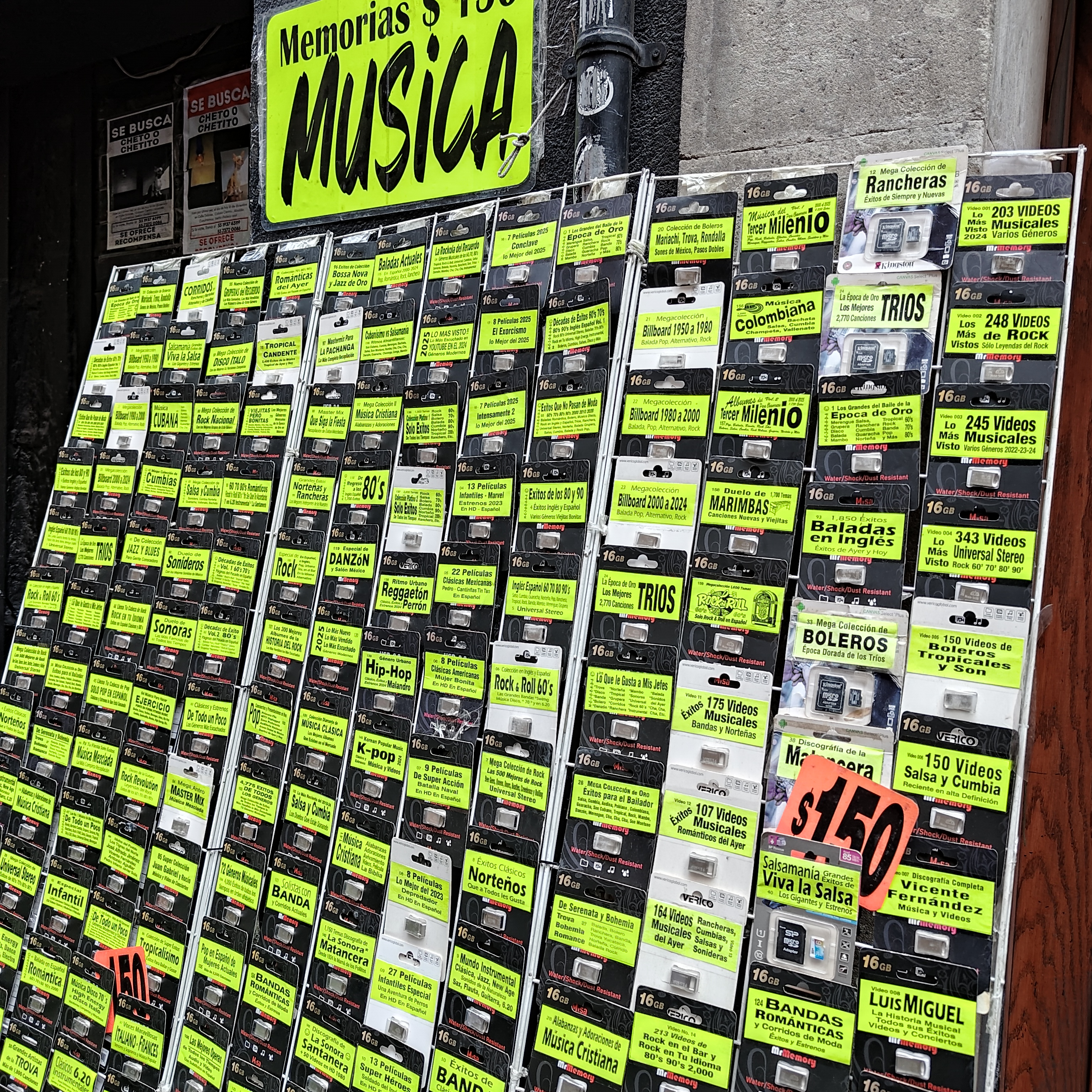
Limited enforcement against small-scale piracy organizations which distribute pirated media on USB drives and SD cards is common in countries like Cuba and Mexico.

In Media Piracy in Emerging Economies, the first independent comparative study of media piracy focused on Brazil, India, Russia, South Africa, Mexico, Turkey and Bolivia, "high prices for media goods, low incomes, and cheap digital technologies" are the chief factors that lead to the global spread of media piracy, especially in emerging markets. According to the study, even though digital piracy inflicts additional costs on the production side of media, it also offers the main access to media goods in developing countries. The strong tradeoffs that favour using digital piracy in developing economies dictate the current neglected law enforcement toward digital piracy.

In China as of 2013, the issue of digital infringement has not merely been legal, but social – originating from the high demand for cheap and affordable goods as well as the governmental connections of the businesses which produce such goods.

=== Motivations due to censorship ===
There have been instances where a country's government bans a movie, resulting in the spread of copied videos and DVDs. Romanian-born documentary maker Ilinca Calugareanu wrote a New York Times article telling the story of Irina Margareta Nistor, a narrator for state TV under Nicolae Ceauşescu's regime. A visitor from the West gave her bootlegged copies of American movies, which she dubbed for secret viewings through Romania. According to the article, she dubbed more than 3,000 movies and became the country's second-most famous voice after Ceauşescu, even though no one knew her name until many years later.

== Existing and proposed laws ==
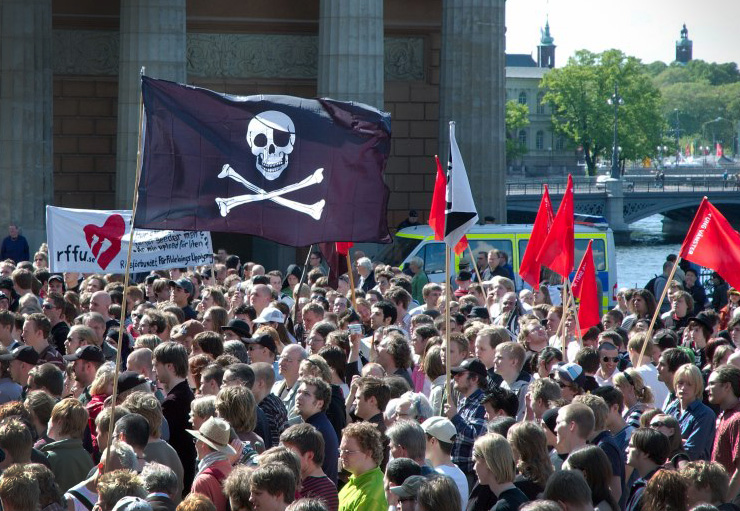
Demonstration in Sweden in support of file sharing, 2006

The Pirate Bay logo, a retaliation to the stereotypical image of piracy

Most countries extend copyright protections to authors of works. In countries with copyright legislation, enforcement of copyright is generally the responsibility of the copyright holder. However, in several jurisdictions there are also criminal penalties for copyright infringement. According to the US Chamber of Commerce's 2021 IP Index, the nations with the lowest scores for copyright protection were Vietnam, Pakistan, Egypt, Nigeria, Brunei, Algeria, Venezuela and Argentina.

== Civil law ==
Copyright infringement in civil law is any violation of the exclusive rights of the owner. In US law, these rights include reproduction, preparation of derivative works, distribution of copies by sale or rental, and public performances or displays.

In the United States, copyright infringement is sometimes confronted via lawsuits in civil court, against alleged infringers directly or against providers of services and software that support unauthorized copying. For example, major motion-picture corporation MGM Studios filed suit against P2P file-sharing services Grokster and Streamcast for their contributory role in copyright infringement. In 2005, the Supreme Court ruled in favor of MGM, holding that such services could be held liable for copyright infringement since they functioned and, indeed, wilfully marketed themselves as venues for acquiring copyrighted movies. The MGM v. Grokster case did not overturn the earlier Sony v. Universal City Studios decision, but rather clouded the legal waters; future designers of software capable of being used for copyright infringement were warned.

In the United States, the copyright term has been extended many times over from the original term of 14 years with a single renewal allowance of 14 years, to the current term of the life of the author plus 70 years. If the work was produced under corporate authorship it may last 120 years after creation or 95 years after publication, whichever is sooner.

Article 50 of the Agreement on Trade-Related Aspects of Intellectual Property Rights (TRIPs) requires that signatory countries enable courts to remedy copyright infringement with injunctions and the destruction of infringing products, and award damages. Some jurisdictions only allow actual, provable damages, and some, like the United States, allow for large statutory damage awards intended to deter would-be infringers and allow for compensation in situations where actual damages are difficult to prove.

In some jurisdictions, copyright or the right to enforce it can be contractually assigned to a third party that did not have a role in producing the work. When this outsourced litigator appears to have no intention of taking any copyright infringement cases to trial, but rather only takes them just far enough through the legal system to identify and exact settlements from suspected infringers, critics commonly refer to the party as a "copyright troll". Such practices have had mixed results in the US

=== Non-commercial file sharing ===
==== Legality of downloading ====
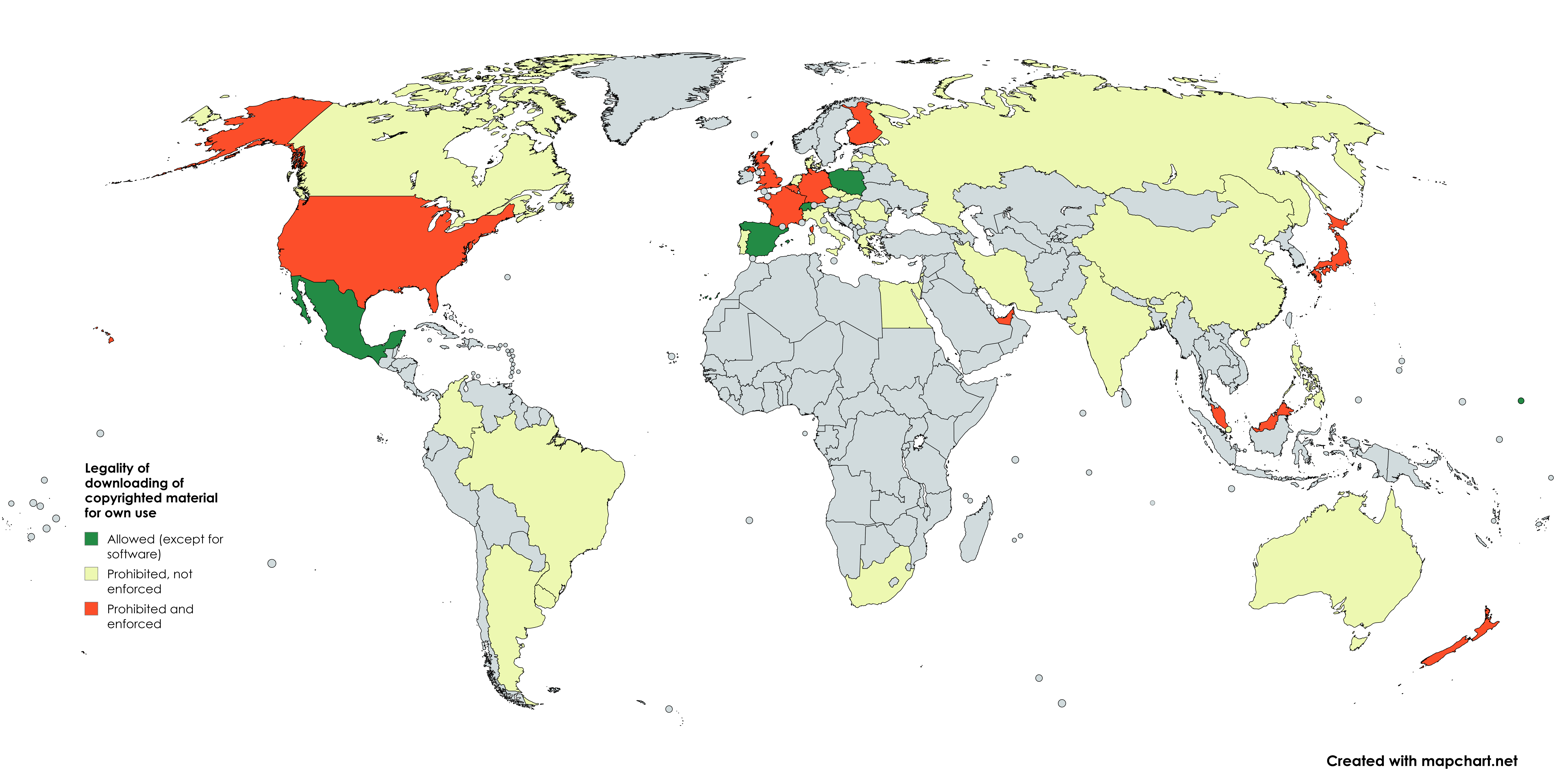
Legality of downloading of copyrighted material for own use

To an extent, copyright law in some countries permits downloading copyright-protected content for personal, noncommercial use. Examples include Canada and European Union (EU) member states like Poland.

The personal copying exemption in the copyright law of EU member states stems from the Information Society Directive of 2001, which is generally devised to allow EU members to enact laws permitting making copies without authorization, as long as they are for personal, noncommercial use. The Directive was not intended to legitimize file-sharing, but rather the common practice of space shifting copyright-protected content from a legally purchased CD (for example) to certain kinds of devices and media, provided rights holders are compensated and no copy protection measures are circumvented. Rights-holder compensation takes various forms, depending on the country, but is generally either a levy on "recording" devices and media, or a tax on the content itself. In some countries, such as Canada, the applicability of such laws to copying onto general-purpose storage devices like computer hard drives, portable media players, and phones, for which no levies are collected, has been the subject of debate and further efforts to reform copyright law.

In some countries, the personal copying exemption explicitly requires that the content being copied be obtained legitimately (i.e. from authorized sources, not file-sharing networks). In April 2014, the Court of Justice of the European Union ruled that "national legislation which makes no distinction between private copies made from lawful sources and those made from counterfeited or pirated sources cannot be tolerated."

==== Legality of uploading ====
Although downloading or other private copying is sometimes permitted, public distribution – by uploading or otherwise offering to share copyright-protected content – remains illegal in most, if not all, countries. For example, in Canada, even though it was once legal to download any copyrighted file as long as it was for noncommercial use, it was still illegal to distribute the copyrighted files (e.g. by uploading them to a P2P network).

==== Relaxed penalties ====
Some countries, like Canada and Germany, have limited the penalties for non-commercial copyright infringement. For example, Germany has passed a bill to limit the fine for individuals accused of sharing movies and series to €800–900. Canada's Copyright Modernization Act claims that statutory damages for non-commercial copyright infringement are capped at C$5,000 but this only applies to copies that have been made without the breaking of any "digital lock." However, this only applies to "bootleg distribution" and not non-commercial use.

=== DMCA and anti-circumvention laws ===
Title I of the US DMCA, the WIPO Copyright and Performances and Phonograms Treaties Implementation Act has provisions that prevent persons from "circumvent[ing] a technological measure that effectively controls access to a work". Thus if a distributor of copyrighted works has some kind of software, dongle or password access device installed in instances of the work, any attempt to bypass such a copy protection scheme may be actionable – though the US Copyright Office is currently reviewing anticircumvention rulemaking under DMCA – anti-circumvention exemptions that have been in place under the DMCA include those in software designed to filter websites that are generally seen to be inefficient (child safety and public library website filtering software) and the circumvention of copy protection mechanisms that have malfunctioned, have caused the instance of the work to become inoperable or which are no longer supported by their manufacturers. According to Abby House Media Inc. v. Apple Inc., it is legal to point users to DRM-stripping software and inform them how to use it because of lack of evidence that DRM stripping leads to copyright infringement.

=== Online intermediary liability ===
Whether Internet intermediaries are liable for copyright infringement by their users is a subject of debate and court cases in a number of countries.

==== Definition of intermediary ====
Internet intermediaries were formerly understood to be internet service providers (ISPs). However, questions of liability have also emerged in relation to other Internet infrastructure intermediaries, including Internet backbone providers, cable companies and mobile communications providers.

In addition, intermediaries are now also generally understood to include Internet portals, software and games providers, those providing virtual information such as interactive forums and comment facilities with or without a moderation system, aggregators of various kinds, such as news aggregators, universities, libraries and archives, web search engines, chat rooms, web blogs, mailing lists, and any website which provides access to third party content through, for example, hyperlinks, a crucial element of the World Wide Web.

==== Litigation and legislation concerning intermediaries ====
Early court cases focused on the liability of Internet service providers (ISPs) for hosting, transmitting or publishing user-supplied content that could be actioned under civil or criminal law, such as libel or pornography.

The debate has shifted away from questions about liability for specific content, including that which may infringe copyright, towards whether online intermediaries should be generally responsible for content accessible through their services or infrastructure.

The US Digital Millennium Copyright Act (October 1998) and the European E-Commerce Directive (June 2000) provide online intermediaries with limited statutory immunity from liability for copyright infringement. Online intermediaries hosting content that infringes copyright are not liable, so long as they do not know about it and take action once the infringing content is brought to their attention. In US law this is characterized as "safe harbor" provisions. Under European law, the governing principles for Internet Service Providers are "mere conduit", meaning that they are neutral 'pipes' with no knowledge of what they are carrying; and 'no obligation to monitor' meaning that they cannot be given a general mandate by governments to monitor content. These two principles are a barrier for certain forms of online copyright enforcement and they were the reason behind an attempt to amend the European Telecoms Package in 2009 to support new measures against copyright infringement.

==== Peer-to-peer issues ====
Peer-to-peer file sharing intermediaries have been denied access to safe harbor provisions in relation to copyright infringement. Legal action against such intermediaries, such as Napster, is generally brought in relation to principles of secondary liability for copyright infringement, such as contributory liability and vicarious liability.

These types of intermediaries do not host or transmit infringing content themselves, but may be regarded in some courts as encouraging, enabling or facilitating infringement by users. These intermediaries may include the authors, publishers, and marketers of peer-to-peer networking software, and the websites that allow users to download such software. In the case of the BitTorrent protocol, intermediaries may include the torrent tracker and any websites or search engines which facilitate access to torrent files. Torrent files do not contain copyrighted content, but they may refer to files that do, and they may point to trackers which coordinate the sharing of those files. Some torrent indexing and search sites, such as The Pirate Bay, now encourage the use of magnet links, instead of direct links to torrent files, creating another layer of indirection; using such links, torrent files are obtained from other peers, rather than from a particular website.

Since the late 1990s, copyright holders have taken legal actions against a number of peer-to-peer intermediaries, such as pir, Grokster, eMule, SoulSeek, BitTorrent and Limewire, and case law on the liability of Internet service providers (ISPs) in relation to copyright infringement has emerged primarily in relation to these cases.

Nevertheless, whether and to what degree any of these types of intermediaries have secondary liability is the subject of ongoing litigation. The decentralized structure of peer-to-peer networks, in particular, does not sit easily with existing laws on online intermediaries' liability. The BitTorrent protocol established an entirely decentralized network architecture in order to distribute large files effectively. Recent developments in peer-to-peer technology towards more complex network configurations are said to have been driven by a desire to avoid liability as intermediaries under existing laws.

== Criminal law ==
Punishment of copyright infringement varies case-by-case across countries. Convictions may include jail time or severe fines for each instance of copyright infringement. In the United States, wilful copyright infringement carries a maximum fine of $150,000 per instance.

Article 61 of the Agreement on Trade-Related Aspects of Intellectual Property Rights (TRIPs) requires that signatory countries establish criminal procedures and penalties in cases of "willful trademark counterfeiting or copyright piracy on a commercial scale". Copyright holders have demanded that states provide criminal sanctions for all types of copyright infringement.

The first criminal provision in US copyright law was added in 1897, which established a misdemeanor penalty for "unlawful performances and representations of copyrighted dramatic and musical compositions" if the violation had been "willful and for profit". Criminal copyright infringement requires that the infringer acted "for the purpose of commercial advantage or private financial gain" (17 U.S.C. § 506). To establish criminal liability, the prosecutor must first show the basic elements of copyright infringement: ownership of a valid copyright, and the violation of one or more of the copyright holder's exclusive rights. The government must then establish that the defendant wilfully infringed or, in other words, possessed the necessary mens rea. Misdemeanor infringement has a very low threshold in terms of the number of copies and the value of the infringed works.

The ACTA trade agreement, signed in May 2011 by the United States, Japan, and the EU, requires that its parties add criminal penalties, including incarceration and fines, for copyright and trademark infringement, and obligated the parties to actively police for infringement.

== Limitations ==
Copyright law does not grant authors and publishers absolute control over the use of their work. Only certain types of works and kinds of uses are protected; only unauthorized uses of protected works can be said to be infringing.

=== Non-infringing uses ===
Article 10 of the Berne Convention mandates that national laws provide for limitations to copyright, so that copyright protection does not extend to certain kinds of uses that fall under what the treaty calls "fair practice", including but not limited to minimal quotations used in journalism and education. The laws implementing these limitations and exceptions for uses that would otherwise be infringing broadly fall into the categories of either fair use or fair dealing. In common law systems, these fair practice statutes typically enshrine principles underlying many earlier judicial precedents, and are considered essential to freedom of speech.

Another example is the practice of compulsory licensing, which is where the law forbids copyright owners from denying a licence for certain uses of certain kinds of works, such as compilations and live performances of music. Compulsory licensing laws generally say that for certain uses of certain works, no infringement occurs as long as a royalty, at a rate determined by law rather than private negotiation, is paid to the copyright owner or representative copyright collective. Some fair dealing laws, such as Canada's, include similar royalty requirements.

In Europe, the copyright infringement case Public Relations Consultants Association Ltd v Newspaper Licensing Agency Ltd had two prongs; one concerned whether a news aggregator service infringed the copyright of the news generators; the other concerned whether the temporary web cache created by the web browser of a consumer of the aggregator's service, also infringed the copyright of the news generators. The first prong was decided in favor of the news generators; in June 2014 the second prong was decided by the Court of Justice of the European Union (CJEU), which ruled that the temporary web cache of consumers of the aggregator did not infringe the copyright of the news generators.

=== Non-infringing types of works ===
In order to qualify for protection, a work must be an expression with a degree of originality, and it must be in a fixed medium, such as written down on paper or recorded digitally. The idea itself is not protected. That is, a copy of someone else's original idea is not infringing unless it copies that person's unique, tangible expression of the idea. Some of these limitations, especially regarding what qualifies as original, are embodied only in case law (judicial precedent), rather than in statutes.

In the United States, for example, copyright case law contains a substantial similarity requirement to determine whether the work was copied. Likewise, courts may require computer software to pass an Abstraction-Filtration-Comparison test (AFC Test) to determine if it is too abstract to qualify for protection, or too dissimilar to an original work to be considered infringing. Software-related case law has also clarified that the amount of R&D, effort and expense put into a work's creation does not affect copyright protection.

Evaluation of alleged copyright infringement in a court of law may be substantial; the time and costs required to apply these tests vary based on the size and complexity of the copyrighted material. Furthermore, there is no standard or universally accepted test; some courts have rejected the AFC Test, for example, in favor of narrower criteria.

== Preventive measures ==
The BSA outlined four strategies that governments can adopt to reduce software piracy rates in its 2011 piracy study results:

- "Increase public education and raise awareness about software piracy and IP rights in cooperation with industry and law enforcement."
- "Modernize protections for software and other copyrighted materials to keep pace with new innovations such as cloud computing and the proliferation of networked mobile devices."
- "Strengthen enforcement of IP laws with dedicated resources, including specialized enforcement units, training for law enforcement and judiciary officials, improved cross-border cooperation among law enforcement agencies, and fulfillment of obligations under the World Trade Organization's Agreement on Trade-Related Aspects of Intellectual Property Rights (TRIPS)."
- "Lead by example by using only fully licensed software, implementing software asset management (SAM) programs, and promoting the use of legal software in state-owned enterprises, and among all contractors and suppliers."

=== Legal ===
Corporations and legislatures take different types of preventive measures to deter copyright infringement, with much of the focus since the early 1990s being on preventing or reducing digital methods of infringement. Strategies include education, civil and criminal legislation, and international agreements, as well as publicizing anti-piracy litigation successes and imposing forms of digital media copy protection, such as controversial DRM technology and anti-circumvention laws, which limit the amount of control consumers have over the use of products and content they have purchased.

Legislatures have reduced infringement by narrowing the scope of what is considered infringing. Aside from upholding international copyright treaty obligations to provide general limitations and exceptions, nations have enacted compulsory licensing laws applying specifically to digital works and uses. For example, in the US, the DMCA, an implementation of the 1996 WIPO Copyright Treaty, considers digital transmissions of audio recordings to be licensed as long as a designated copyright collective's royalty and reporting requirements are met. The DMCA also provides safe harbor for digital service providers whose users are suspected of copyright infringement, thus reducing the likelihood that the providers themselves will be considered directly infringing.

Some copyright owners voluntarily reduce the scope of what is considered infringement by employing relatively permissive, "open" licensing strategies: rather than privately negotiating licence terms with individual users who must first seek out the copyright owner and ask for permission, the copyright owner publishes and distributes the work with a prepared licence that anyone can use, as long as they adhere to certain conditions. This has the effect of reducing infringement – and the burden on courts – by simply permitting certain types of uses under terms that the copyright owner considers reasonable. Examples include free software licences, like the GNU General Public License (GPL), and the Creative Commons licences, which are predominantly applied to visual and literary works.

=== Protected distribution ===
To maximize revenue, film distribution typically begins with cinemas (theatrical window), on average approximately 16 1/2 weeks, before the release to Blu-ray and DVD (entering its video window). During the theatrical window, digital versions of films are often transported in data storage devices by couriers rather than by data transmission. The data can be encrypted, with the key being made to work only at specific times in order to prevent leakage between screens.

=== Watermarking ===
Coded anti-piracy marks can be added to films to identify the source of illegal copies and shut them down. In 2006, a notable example of using Coded Anti-Piracy marks resulted in a man being arrested for uploading a screener's copy of the movie Flushed Away. Some photocopiers use Machine Identification Code dots for similar purposes. The EURion constellation on banknotes is used to prevent copying to make counterfeit currency.

== Economic impact of copyright infringement ==
Organisations disagree on the scope and magnitude of copyright infringement's free rider economic effects and public support for the copyright regime.

The European Commission funded a study to analyze "the extent to which unauthorized online consumption of copyrighted materials (music, audiovisual, books and video games) displaces sales of online and offline legal content", across Germany, the United Kingdom, Spain, France, Poland and Sweden; the public funding behind the study provided a necessary basis for its neutrality. 30,000 users, including minors between 14 and 17 years, were surveyed between September and October 2014. While a negative impact was found for the film industry, videogame sales were positively affected by illegal consumption, possibly due to "the industry being successful in converting illegal users to paying users" and employing player-oriented strategies (for example, by providing additional bonus levels or items in the gameplay for a fee); finally, no evidence was found for any claims of sales displacement in the other market sectors. According to the European Digital Rights association, the study may have been censored: specifically, as of 2018, the European Commission has not published the results, except in the part where the film industry was found to be adversely affected by illegal content consumption. Access to the study was requested and obtained by Member of the European Parliament Felix Reda.

In relation to computer software, the Business Software Alliance (BSA) claimed in its 2011 piracy study: "Public opinion continues to support intellectual property (IP) rights: Seven PC users in 10 support paying innovators to promote more technological advances."

Following consultation with experts on copyright infringement, the United States Government Accountability Office (GAO) clarified in 2010 that "estimating the economic impact of IP [intellectual property] infringements is extremely difficult, and assumptions must be used due to the absence of data", while "it is difficult, if not impossible, to quantify the net effect of counterfeiting and piracy on the economy as a whole."

The US GAO's 2010 findings regarding the great difficulty of accurately gauging the economic impact of copyright infringement were reinforced within the same report by the body's research into three commonly cited estimates that had previously been provided to US agencies. The GAO report explained that the sources – a Federal Bureau of Investigation (FBI) estimate, a Customs and Border Protection (CBP) press release and a Motor and Equipment Manufacturers Association estimate – "cannot be substantiated or traced back to an underlying data source or methodology."

Deaner explained the importance of rewarding the "investment risk" taken by motion picture studios in 2014:

Usually, movies are hot because a distributor has spent hundreds of thousands of dollars promoting the product in print and TV and other forms of advertising. The major Hollywood studios spend millions on this process with marketing costs rivalling the costs of production. They are attempting then to monetise through returns that can justify the investment in both the costs of promotion and production.

=== Motion picture industry estimates ===
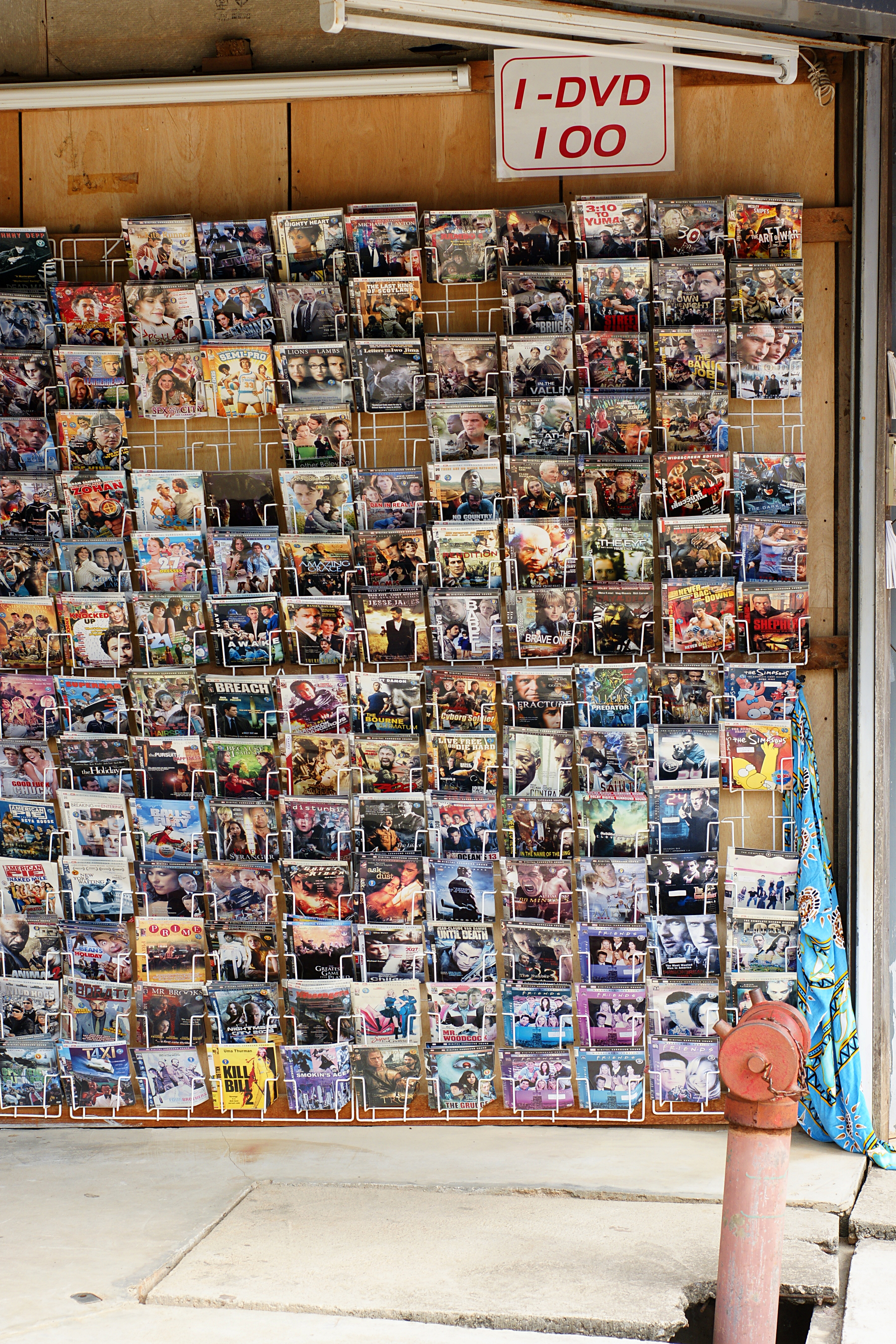
A store selling pirated movies in Ko Lanta, Thailand

In 2008, the Motion Picture Association of America (MPAA) reported that its six major member companies lost US$6.1 billion to piracy. A 2009 Los Angeles Daily News article then cited a loss figure of "roughly $20 billion a year" for Hollywood studios. According to a 2013 article in The Wall Street Journal, industry estimates in the United States range between $6.1B to $18.5B per year.

In an early May 2014 article in The Guardian, an annual loss figure of US$20.5 billion was cited for the movie industry. The article's basis is the results of a University of Portsmouth study that only involved Finnish participants, aged between seven and 84. The researchers, who worked with 6,000 participants, stated: "Movie pirates are also more likely to cut down their piracy if they feel they are harming the industry compared with people who illegally download music".

However, a study conducted on data from sixteen countries between 2005 and 2013, many of which had enacted anti-piracy measures to increase box office revenues of movies, found no significant increases in any markets attributable to policy interventions, which calls into doubt the claimed negative economic effects of digital piracy on the film industry.

=== Software industry estimates ===
Psion Software claimed in 1983 that software piracy cost it £2.9 million a year, 30% of its revenue. Will Wright said that Raid on Bungeling Bay sold 20,000 copies for the Commodore 64 in the US, but 800,000 cartridges for the Nintendo Famicom with a comparable installed base in Japan, "because it's a cartridge system [so] there's virtually no piracy".

According to a 2007 BSA and International Data Corporation (IDC) study, the five countries with the highest rates of software piracy were: 1. Armenia (93%); 2. Bangladesh (92%); 3. Azerbaijan (92%); 4. Moldova (92%); and 5. Zimbabwe (91%). According to the study's results, the five countries with the lowest piracy rates were: 1. the US (20%); 2. Luxembourg (21%); 3. New Zealand (22%); 4. Japan (23%); and 5. Austria (25%). The 2007 report showed that the Asia-Pacific region was associated with the highest amount of loss, in terms of US dollars, with $14,090,000, followed by the European Union, with a loss of $12,383,000; the lowest amount of US dollars was lost in the Middle East/Africa region, where $2,446,000 was documented.

In its 2011 report, conducted in partnership with IDC and Ipsos Public Affairs, the BSA stated: "Over half of the world's personal computer users – 57 percent – admit to pirating software." The ninth annual "BSA Global Software Piracy Study" claims that the "commercial value of this shadow market of pirated software" was worth US$63.4 billion in 2011, with the highest commercial value of pirated PC software existing in the US during that time period (US$9,773,000). According to the 2011 study, Zimbabwe was the nation with the highest piracy rate, at 92%, while the lowest piracy rate was present in the US, at 19%.

The GAO noted in 2010 that the BSA's research up until that year defined "piracy as the difference between total installed software and legitimate software sold, and its scope involved only packaged physical software."

=== Music industry estimates ===
In 2007, the Institute for Policy Innovation (IPI) reported that music piracy took $12.5 billion from the US economy. According to the study, musicians and those involved in the recording industry are not the only ones who experience losses attributed to music piracy. Retailers have lost over a billion dollars, while piracy has resulted in 46,000 fewer production-level jobs and almost 25,000 retail jobs. The US government was also reported to suffer from music piracy, losing $422 million in tax revenue.

A 2007 study in the Journal of Political Economy found that the effect of music downloads on legal music sales was "statistically indistinguishable from zero".

A report from 2013, released by the European Commission Joint Research Centre suggests that illegal music downloads have almost no effect on the number of legal music downloads. The study analysed the behaviour of 16,000 European music consumers and found that although music piracy negatively affects offline music sales, illegal music downloads had a positive effect on legal music purchases. Without illegal downloading, legal purchases were about two per cent lower.

The study has received criticism, particularly from the International Federation of the Phonographic Industry, which believes the study is flawed and misleading. One argument against the research is that many music consumers only download music illegally. The IFPI also points out that music piracy affects not only online music sales but also multiple facets of the music industry, which is not addressed in the study.

=== Media industry estimates ===
In a March 2019 article, The New York Times reported that the Qatar-based beIN Media Group suffered "billions of dollars" of losses, following the unilateral cancellation of an exclusive contract it shared with the Asian Football Confederation (AFC) for the past 10 years. The decision by the AFC to invalidate its licence for broadcasting rights to air games in Saudi Arabia came after the kingdom was accused of leading a piracy operation through its television broadcaster, beoutQ, misappropriating sports content owned by beIN Sports since 2017, worth billions of dollars.

In January 2020, the European Commission released a report on protection and enforcement of intellectual property rights in third countries. The report named as many as 13 countries, including Argentina, Brazil, China, Ecuador, India, Indonesia, and Saudi Arabia, the last being included for the first time. The report said piracy is "causing considerable harm to EU businesses" and high economic losses have occurred in Argentina, China, Ecuador and India. It also informed that Saudi Arabia has not "taken sufficient steps to stop the infringement" caused via BeoutQ, like other countries have, to minimize the extent of financial and economic loss.

=== Legal costs of defending and litigation for copyright infringement ===
In addition to suffering losses to income, copyright holders can end up spending up to 10 thousand dollars proving in court when dealing with piracy which can divert resources away from creating new creative works. This includes communication, planning, necessary court filings, meetings with opposing counsel or judges dealing with lawsuits that can typically last for months to years and costing from $5000 to $350,000. Artists may need to reclaim their right to their own copyright and the process can last for up to months. And if they were for whatever reason not successful, they may need to appeal or create a new work.

=== Criticism of industry estimates ===
Some claims made by industry representatives have been criticized as overestimating the monetary loss caused by copyright infringement. In one example, the RIAA claimed damages against LimeWire totalling $75 trillion – more than the global GDP – with the judge overseeing the case ruling that such claims were "absurd". The $75 trillion figure had been obtained by counting each song downloaded as an infringement of copyright. After the conclusion of the case, LimeWire agreed to pay $105 million to RIAA.

In another decision, US District Court Judge James P. Jones found that the "RIAA's request problematically assumes that every illegal download resulted in a lost sale", indicating profit/loss estimates were likely extremely off.

Critics of industry estimates argue that those who use peer-to-peer sharing services, or practice "piracy" are actually more likely to pay for music. A Jupiter Research study in 2000 found that "Napster users were 45 percent more likely to have increased their music purchasing habits than online music fans who don't use the software were." This indicated that users of peer-to-peer sharing did not hurt the profits of the music industry, but in fact may have increased it.

Professor Aram Sinnreich, in his book The Piracy Crusade, states that the connection between declining music sales and the creation of peer-to-peer file sharing sites such as Napster is tenuous, based on correlation rather than causation. He argues that the industry at the time was undergoing artificial expansion, what he describes as a "'perfect bubble'—a confluence of economic, political, and technological forces that drove the aggregate value of music sales to unprecedented heights at the end of the twentieth century".

Sinnreich cites multiple causes for the economic bubble, including the CD format replacement cycle; the shift from music speciality stores to wholesale suppliers of music and 'minimum advertised pricing'; and the economic expansion of 1991–2001. He believes that with the introduction of new digital technologies, the bubble burst, and the industry suffered as a result.

=== Economic impact of infringement in emerging markets ===
The 2011 Business Software Alliance Piracy Study Standard estimated the total commercial value of illegally copied software to be at $59 billion in 2010, with emerging markets accounting for $31.9 billion, over half of the total. Furthermore, mature markets for the first time received fewer PC shipments than emerging economies in 2010. In addition, software infringement rates were 68 per cent compared to 24 per cent in mature markets; thus, emerging markets possessed the majority of the global increase in the commercial value of counterfeit software. China continued to have the highest commercial value of such software at $8.9 billion among developing countries and second in the world behind the US at $9.7 billion in 2011. In 2011, the Business Software Alliance announced that 83 per cent of software deployed on PCs in Africa had been pirated (excluding South Africa).

Some countries distinguish corporate piracy from private use, which is tolerated as a welfare service. This is the leading reason developing countries refuse to accept or respect copyright laws. Traian Băsescu, the president of Romania from 2004 to 2014, stated that "piracy helped the young generation discover computers. It set off the development of the IT industry in Romania."

== Pro-free-culture organizations ==
- Free Software Foundation (FSF)
- Open Source Initiative (OSI)
- Electronic Frontier Foundation (EFF)
- Creative Commons (CC)
- Demand Progress
- Fight for the Future
- Pirate Party
- Plan S, by major funders of scientific research

== Anti-copyright-infringement organizations ==
- Business Software Alliance (BSA)
- Canadian Alliance Against Software Theft (CAAST)
- Entertainment Software Association (ESA)
- Federation Against Copyright Theft (FACT)
- Federation Against Software Theft (FAST)
- International Intellectual Property Alliance (IIPA)
- Copyright Alliance

== See also ==
- Abandonware
- In re Aimster Copyright Litigation
- Copy protection § Anti-piracy
- Copyright law of Australia
- Cable television piracy
- Center for Copyright Information
- Comparison of anti-plagiarism software
- Computer Associates Int. Inc. v. Altai Inc.
- Copyfraud
- Copyleft
- Copyright aspects of downloading and streaming
- Copyright, Designs and Patents Act 1988
- Copyrighted content on file sharing networks
- Copyright Remedy Clarification Act
- Criminal remedies for copyright infringement
- Elektra Records Co. v. Gem Electronic Distributors, Inc.
- Fair use
- Federation Against Copyright Theft (FACT)
- Intellectual property in China
- Internet Privacy Act
- Jacobsen v. Katzer
- Legal aspects of copyright infringement
- Licence laundering
- Missionary Church of Kopimism
- Open Letter to Hobbyists
- Pirated movie release types
- Plagiarism
- Playboy Enterprises, Inc. v. Frena
- Product activation
- Public domain
- Radio music ripping
- Software copyright
- Software cracking
- Trade group efforts against file sharing
- Trans-Pacific Partnership
- Video copy detection
- Video game piracy
- Warez
- Windows Genuine Advantage
- World Anti-Piracy Observatory (WAPO)

== Sources ==
- Horten, M. (2011). The Copyright Enforcement Enigma: Internet Politics and the 'Telecoms Package'. Palgrave Macmillan UK. ISBN 978-0-230-32171-7.
- McDonald, Paul; Wasko, Janet (2008). The Contemporary Hollywood Film Industry. Wiley. ISBN 978-1-4051-3387-6.
- Li, Xuan; Correa, Carlos Maria (2009). Intellectual Property Enforcement: International Perspectives. Edward Elgar Publishing. ISBN 978-1-84844-925-1.
- Waelde, Charlotte; Edwards, Lilian (2005). Online intermediaries and copyright liability (Report). World Intellectual Property Organisation. hdl:1842/2305. SSRN 1159640.
