= Judicial scrivener =

Legal profession in some Asian countries

"Judicial scrivener" is a term used to refer to similar legal professions in Japan, South Korea and Taiwan. Judicial scriveners assist clients in commercial and real estate registration procedures and in the preparation of documents for litigation.

== Japan ==
In Japan, judicial scriveners (司法書士, shihō shoshi) are authorized to represent their clients in real estate registrations, commercial registrations (e.g. the incorporation of companies), preparation of court documents and filings with legal affairs bureaus. Judicial scriveners may also represent clients in summary courts, arbitration and mediation proceedings, but are not allowed to represent clients in district courts or more advanced stages of litigation. The more familiar term "solicitor" is also sometimes used to refer to them, although the division of responsibilities is not the same as between solicitors and barristers in the English legal system. The term "judicial scrivener", while somewhat archaic in tone, is a fairly accurate literal translation of the Japanese term.

Judicial scriveners must pass an examination administered by the Ministry of Justice. The examination tests knowledge of twelve Japanese statutes, the four principal ones being the Civil Code, Real Estate Registration Act, Commercial Code and Commercial Registration Act. (The Corporations Act was added to the examination in 2006.) The examination consists of two written tests followed by one oral test; the overall pass rate is 2.8%. A person may also become qualified as a judicial scrivener by working for ten years as a court secretary, judicial secretary, or prosecutor's secretary.

Judicial scriveners must maintain a membership in the judicial scrivener association (司法書士会, shihō shoshi kai) for the prefecture in which they work. They can be found in solo practice or attached to law firms as employees of attorneys at law. A small number of judicial scriveners work as in-house counsel for companies, but there are strict conditions for registration of in-house judicial scriveners.

=== History ===
When Japan adopted a Western-style court system in 1872, it established a profession of daishonin (代書人) to represent clients in the preparation of documents, alongside the daigennin (代言人) who represented clients in courtroom arguments (this latter profession became known as attorneys at law (弁護士, bengoshi) in 1890). A 1919 statute established a separate tier of shihō daishonin (司法代書人) to handle court documents. The modern shihō shoshi title was adopted under a revised statute in 1935, which was superseded by a new law in 1950. The other half of the daishonin profession was replaced by the administrative scrivener profession.

== South Korea ==
South Korea has a similar profession known as beommusa (Korean: 법무사; Hanja: 法務士). This is officially translated as "Certified Judicial Scrivener". It is noteworthy that beommusa cannot represent client in court in any litigation, since South Korea strictly allow only byeonhosa (변호사; 辯護士, Attorney at Law) to undertake litigation, while banning paralegals from undertaking or even participating in litigation.

== Taiwan ==
Taiwan has a similar profession known as a "land scrivener" (土地代書, short for 土地登記專業代理人).

== See also ==
- Paralegal
- Scrivener
- Legal document assistant
- Judicial system of Japan
