= Licence laundering =

Copying a work, replacing its licence and redistributing it

Licence laundering or license laundering occurs when a creative work under copyright is copied by another party, who then replaces the original licence with a different one. This party then illegitimately distributes the work with the new licence.

Licence laundering of media and related files is common on image hosting providers such as Flickr or Picasa, and video hosting providers such as YouTube.

== Source code laundering ==
In software development, a programmer engages in licence laundering when using source code written by one or more other programmers but removing the licence from the source files or altering the file's header to exclude its revision history or other details. This source code is then modified or integrated into other software, possibly violating the original licence terms.

Another example is using code released under one licence, and redistributing it under a different licence. After SCO Group asserted it owned the intellectual property rights to Unix, a series of SCO/Linux controversies resulted, with SCO Groups chief executive officer Darl McBride stating that "The world is not about stealing people's code, laundering it and saying everything's OK." In SCO Group, Inc. v. Novell, Inc., Novell was found to be the owner of Unix copyrights.

Code for open-source software may be released with a pre-approved non-reciprocal licence permitting its use in other projects, which facilitates license laundering. To avoid such laundering, developers and project managers should determine the source of the code, and mitigate potential problems with a quality assurance inspection.

== Identification ==
Licence laundering may be identified by detecting inconsistencies in the works. Most content creators use a set of common elements that are consistent throughout their portfolio, for example a style or handwriting. Users engaged in licence laundering typically upload files with a diversity of styles, since the styles reflect those of the author, not the licence laundering uploader.

Image licence laundering may be detected by using reverse image search engines, such as TinEye or Google Images' "Search by Image" feature. These services compare the characteristics of a reference work to a database containing the characteristics for numerous works analyzed by the service provider by spidering the World Wide Web. The results of a reverse image search may indicate the original source of the content.

Another technique involves inspecting the Exif data associated with files. If the data is generally consistent in a set of files, the files were likely generated by the same individual, whereas if the data differ significantly, it may be indicative of a copyright infringement. An example is a set of photographs generated by different camera models.
