= Administrative scrivener =

Legal profession in Japan

Administrative Scrivener (行政書士, Gyōsei shoshi) is a legal profession in Japan which files government licenses and permits, drafts documents, and provides legal advice around such interactions. They are also known as Immigration Lawyers, Gyosei-shoshi Lawyers or Certified Administrative Procedures Legal Specialists, although they are not allowed by the law to represent their clients in the judicial procedures in and outside of the court of law.

== Occupation ==
Administrative Scriveners prepare legal documents such as filings with the national and local government, which do not include the court of law. Administrative Scrivener are found in a variety of roles. Many specialize in immigration matters, wills, inheritances, motor vehicle registrations, Development approvals, articles of incorporation, company minutes, etc. Under the Administrative Scrivener Law, the types of documents that such professionals are authorised to prepare extends into the thousands, involving the aforementioned as well as attachments to administrative applications and contractual documents between corporate and private persons. The exception is when certain laws expressly designate a person in another capacity (e.g. a judicial scrivener) to prepare a legal document.

Administrative Scriveners may also give advice on the preparation of such documents, one of the few exceptions to the attorney at law's monopoly on giving "legal advice" for compensation.

The work of an Administrative Scrivener bears certain minor overlaps with that of Attorney at Law or Scrivener in American or Common Law jurisdictions, excluding important elements such as the authority to represent their clients in the legal disputes. Beside attorneys-at-law, prosecutors, justices and judicial scriveners, they form an important part of the legal landscape in Japan.

South Korea has a similar occupation known as Haeng-jeong-sa (Hangul: 행정사, Hanja: 行政士).

== Purpose ==
The 1997 amendment to the Administrative Scrivener Law has clarified the purpose of the qualification and monopoly.

1. This law determines the system of Administrative Scriveners. Such will allow greater precision in the work, (the scrivener) facilitates the smooth execution of administrative procedures. In all, the aim is to provide convenience to the citizenry.

== Qualification ==
Attorneys at law, certified public accountants, patent attorneys and tax attorneys are automatically qualified to register as administrative scriveners. Any person who has worked in an "administrative position" at a government agency for 20 years is also entitled to the qualification. Otherwise, one must take the national examinations held every year as mentioned below.

== Reasons for Revocation of the Registration ==
The registration of Administrative Scriveners can be revoked lawfully if the person belongs to the following.

1. Underage persons,
2. protected persons,
3. undischarged bankrupts,
4. convicted persons within three years of their conviction,
5. dismissed civil servants within three years of dismissal,
6. persons having received disciplinary removal under section 6 of the law within three years of such action,
7. persons barred from work under section 14 within three years of such action,
8. and persons having their names removed from the Bar Association for disciplinary reasons within three years of their removal.

== Registration ==
Administrative Scrivener must maintain a membership in the Administrative Scrivener Association ( 行政書士会, gyōsei shoshi kai ) for the prefecture in which they work. The membership will cost approximately 300,000 yen. Member are also expected thereafter to pay 70,000 yen annually. There exists slight differences in the various prefectures and administrative districts pertaining to the cost.

Without registration, one cannot practice as an administrative scrivener or present themselves as such. Nonetheless, in actuality, there is an increasing trend of members not paying their dues. As disciplinary action, after a request from the prefectural leaders, names of scriveners who do not pay will be released on the website of the Japan Federation of Gyoseishoshi Lawyers, with effect from 20 April 2011. The problem has begun to surface as such. As of March 2009, there are 39,846 registrants with 156 corporate bodies.

== Duty to declare ==
The administrative Scrivener must record his name and impress his professional seal on documents that he prepares (under Execution Procedures of the Administrative Scrivener Law, section 9, subsection 2).

== National Qualification Examinations for Administrative Scriveners ==
All in general are qualified to take the exam. The exam is customarily held throughout the nation on the second Sunday of each November. The prefectural authority designates the civil body, The Corporate Person of the Administrative Scrivener Examinations and Research Centre as its sole executor.

Subjects tested include laws relating to the work of a scrivener such as Constitutional Law, Civil Law, Administrative Law, Companies Law and basic legal knowledge. The aptitude of a person to do such work, such as general knowledge in politics, economics and society, knowledge pertaining to the safe transmission of Information, protection of personal information and comprehension of written passages. The syllabi of each exam is based on the current law as of the first of April every year.

== See also ==
- Scrivener
- Legal document assistant
- Judicial scrivener
- Judicial system of Japan
