= WAPO =

WAPO may refer to:

- WAPO (FM), a radio station in Illinois, United States
- World Anti-Piracy Observatory, a program to combat copyright infringement
- The Washington Post (WaPo), an American newspaper
