= Elektra Records Co. v. Gem Electronic Distributors, Inc. =

1973 United States District Court for the Eastern District of New York case

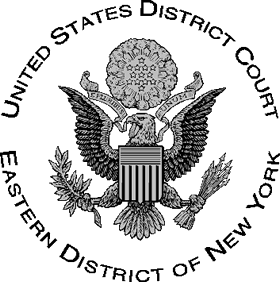
- Court: United States District Court for the Eastern District of New York
- Full case name: Elektra Records Co. v. Gem Electronic Distributors, Inc.
- Decided: June 29, 1973
- Docket nos.: 73-cv-772
- Citation: 360 F. Supp. 821

Court membership
- Judge sitting: Edward Raymond Neaher

Elektra Records Co. v. Gem Electronic Distributors, Inc., 360 F. Supp. 821 (E.D.N.Y. 1973), was an important case before the United States District Court for the Eastern District of New York that concerned copyright infringement, which held that secondary persons or entities could be liable for that tort under certain circumstances, and is also called the "'make-a-tape' case".

The facts were that:

a record shop rented sound recordings to customers who would also purchase blank tape and then use a recording machine on the store premises to copy the rented recording onto the blank tape. The store owner's knowledge of the likely use of the blank tape was patent.

— Jane Ginsburg, Professor, Columbia Law School

Federal courts have held that secondary tort liability exists when:

enabling or inciting another to infringe, at least when the enabler knows that her conduct will result in infringement. Decisions dating back several decades recognize that one who supplies the means to infringe, and knows of the use to which the means will be put (or turns a blind eye), can be held liable for contributory infringement. In the early cases, however, the relationship between the supplier and the user of the means was sufficiently close, that there could be little doubt of either the knowledge or the nexus between the means and the infringement.

— Jane Ginsburg, Professor, Columbia Law School

Knowledge of the infringement of the copyright is the essential element that Elektra Records developed.

== Impact ==
This case was used as a precedent for the US Supreme Court cases of Sony Corp. of America v. Universal City Studios, Inc., 125 S. Ct. 2764 (1984) and MGM Studios, Inc. v. Grokster, Ltd., 464 U.S. 417 (2005).

== See also ==
- Copyright
