= Scrivener =

Clerk, scribe, or notary

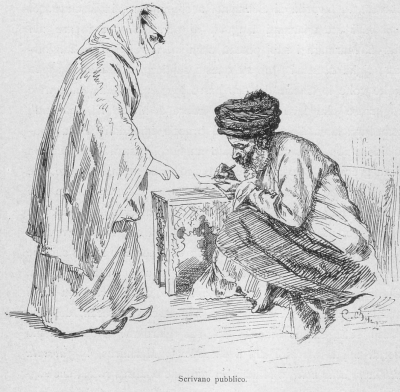
Telling a problem to a public scrivener. Istanbul, 1878

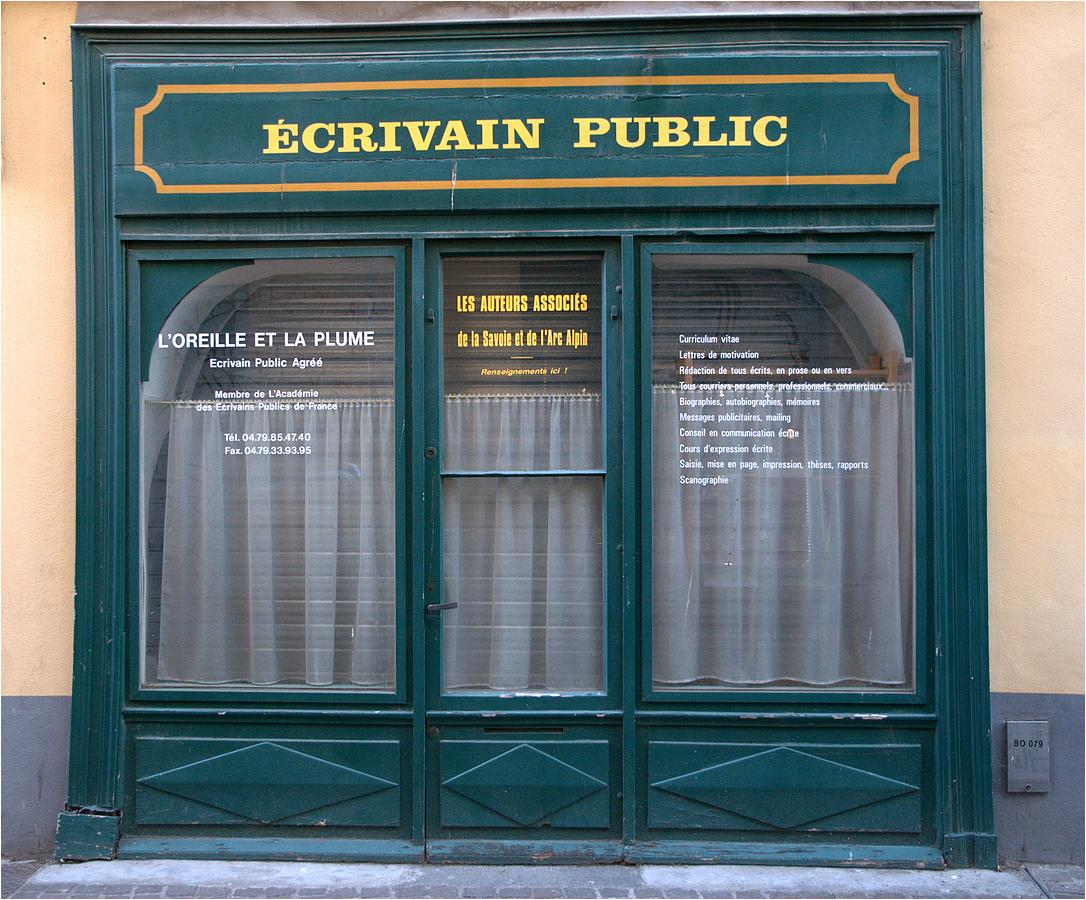
An écrivain public in Chambéry, France

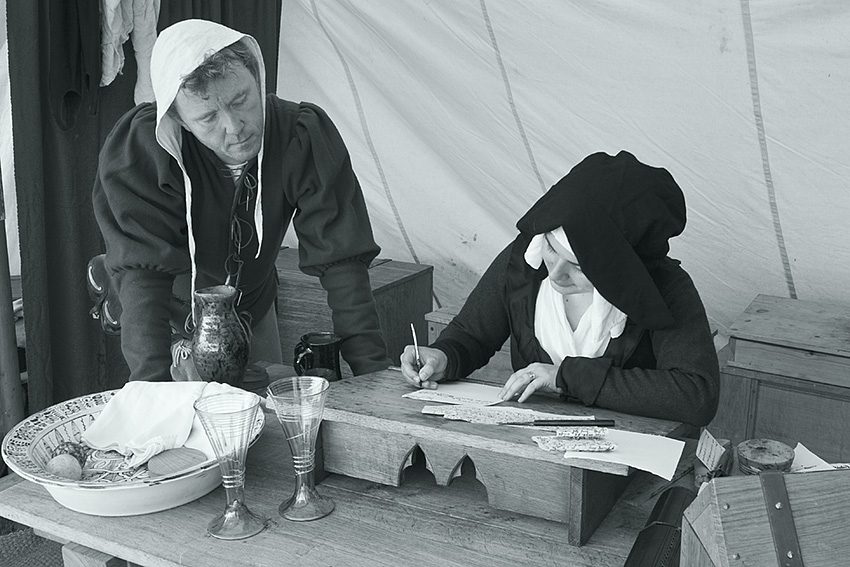
A historical reenactment of a 15th-century scrivener recording the will of a man-at-arms

A scrivener is a professional copyist or scribe whose occupation involves writing or preparing official documents, such as deeds, contracts, mortgages, and other legal instruments, typically for a fee. In Europe, the profession originated in the Middle Ages amid low literacy rates, where scriveners handled essential secretarial, administrative, and notarial duties, often functioning in the lower echelons of the legal field akin to early solicitors. Scriveners later developed into notaries, court reporters, and in England and Wales, scrivener notaries. Styles of handwriting used by scriveners included secretary hand, book hand and court hand.

== Current role ==
Scriveners remain common mainly in countries where literacy rates remain low. In these countries, scriveners will read letters for illiterate customers, as well as write letters or fill out forms for a fee. In areas with very high literacy rates, they are far less common, though social welfare organizations and public libraries will sometimes assist persons of low literacy in filling out official forms, and drafting formal correspondences.

Despite the high literacy rate, in France, "public writers" (écrivains publics) are still common. Their job mainly consists of composing formal writings like curricula vitae or motivation letters for people who do not write well, as well as other things like advertisements, or ghostwriting books. In French-speaking Belgium their return dates from 1999, in an effort to curb semi-literacy and broader socio-cultural inequality; they also include services like reading out loud.

== Etymology ==
The word comes from Middle English scriveiner, an alteration of obsolete scrivein, from Anglo-Norman escrivein, ultimately from Vulgar Latin *scriban-, scriba, itself an alteration of Latin scriba (scribe).

In Japan, the word "scrivener" is used as the standard translation of shoshi (書士), in referring to legal professions such as judicial scriveners and administrative scriveners.

In the Irish language, a scríbhneoir is a writer, or a person who writes. Similarly, in Welsh, ysgrifennu is 'to write', ysgrifennwr is 'writer' and ysgrifennydd is 'secretary, scribe'.

== In literature ==
Bartleby, the Scrivener by Herman Melville, first published in 1853, is a famous work of fiction featuring scriveners.

== Scrivener notaries ==
In England and Wales, a scrivener notary is a notary who is fluent in multiple languages.

Scrivener notary tasks generally include authentication and drafting of legal documents for use in international contexts.

== Doctrine of "scrivener's error" ==
The doctrine of a "scrivener's error" is the legal principle that a map-drafting or typographical error in a written contract may be corrected by oral evidence if the evidence is clear, convincing, and precise. If such correction (called scrivener's amendment) affects property rights then it must be approved by those affected by it.

It is a mistake made while copying or transmitting legal documents, as distinguished from a judgment error, which is an error made in the exercise of judgment or discretion, or a technical error, which is an error in interpreting a law, regulation, or principle. There is a considerable body of case law concerning the proper treatment of a scrivener's error. For example, where the parties to a contract make an oral agreement that, when reduced to a writing, is mis-transcribed, the aggrieved party is entitled to reformation so that the writing corresponds to the oral agreement.

A scrivener's error can be grounds for an appellate court to remand a decision back to the trial court. For example, in Ortiz v. State of Florida, Ortiz had been convicted of possession of less than 20 g of marijuana, a misdemeanor. However, Ortiz was mistakenly adjudicated guilty of a felony for the count of marijuana possession. The appellate court held that "we must remand the case to the trial court to correct a scrivener's error."

In some circumstances, courts can also correct scrivener's errors found in primary legislation.

== See also ==
- Amanuensis
- Administrative scrivener
- Copy typist
- Judicial scrivener
- Katib
- Legal document assistant
- List of obsolete occupations
- Notary
- Notary public
- Worshipful Company of Scriveners
