= No Electronic Theft Act =

US federal law passed in 1997

No Electronic Theft (NET) Act
- Long title: An Act to amend the provisions of titles 17 and 18, United States Code, to provide greater copyright protection by amending criminal copyright infringement provisions, and for other purposes.
- Acronyms (colloquial): NET Act
- Enacted by: the 105th United States Congress
- Effective: December 16, 1997

Citations
- Public law: Pub. L. 105-147
- Statutes at Large: 111 Stat. 2678

Codification
- Acts amended: Copyright Act of 1976
- Titles amended: 17 and 18
- U.S.C. sections amended: 17 USC 101, 506, 507; 18 USC 2319, 2320; 28 USC 1498

Legislative history
- Introduced in the House as H.R. 2265 by Bob Goodlatte (R–VA) on July 25, 1997; Committee consideration by United States House Committee on the Judiciary and United States Senate Committee on the Judiciary; Passed the House on November 4, 1997; Passed the Senate on November 13, 1997; Signed into law by President Bill Clinton on December 16, 1997

The United States No Electronic Theft Act (NET Act), a federal law passed in 1997, provides for criminal prosecution of individuals who engage in copyright infringement under certain circumstances, even when there is no monetary profit or commercial benefit from the infringement. Maximum penalties can be five years in prison with fines.

== History ==
Prior to the enactment of the NET Act in 1997, criminal copyright infringement required that the infringement was for the purpose of "commercial advantage or private financial gain." Merely uploading and downloading files on the internet did not fulfill this requirement, meaning that even large-scale online infringement could not be prosecuted criminally.

This state of affairs was underscored by the unsuccessful 1994 prosecution of David LaMacchia, then a student at the Massachusetts Institute of Technology, for allegedly facilitating massive copyright infringement as a hobby, without any commercial motive. The court's dismissal of United States v. LaMacchia suggested that then-existing criminal law simply did not apply to non-commercial infringements (a state of affairs which became known as the "LaMacchia Loophole"). The court suggested that Congress could act to make some non-commercial infringements a crime, and Congress acted on that suggestion in the NET Act.

The NET Act amended the definition of "commercial advantage or private financial gain" to include the "receipt, or expectation of receipt, of anything of value, including the receipt of other copyrighted works" (17 USC 101), and specifies penalties of up to five years in prison.

In addition, it added a threshold for criminal liability where the infringer neither obtained nor expected to obtain anything of value for the infringement – "by the reproduction or distribution, including by electronic means, during any 180-day period, of 1 or more copies or phono records of 1 or more copyrighted works, which have a total retail value of more than $1,000" (17 USC 506(a)(1)(B)). In response to the NET Act, the US Sentencing Commission stiffened sanctions for intellectual property infringement.

=== Prosecution under this act ===
In 1999, a college student at the University of Oregon was the first to be convicted under the NET act for distributing copyrighted content and allowing others to download it. He pleaded guilty for distributing copyrighted material worth at least $5000 in the United States District Court in Eugene, Oregon, resulting in 2 years of probation with conditions of periodic urine tests and limited Internet access. At the time of the plea, Jeffery admitted that in January 1999, he illegally posted computer software programs, musical recordings, entertainment software programs, and digitally-recorded movies on his Internet web site, allowing the general public to download and copy these copyrighted products.
