= Internet Privacy Act =

Fictional American law

The Internet Privacy Act is a non-existent and fictitious American law cited by websites that conduct illegal activities in order to deter organizations that look to prosecute such activities. Networks which share music, films and software, for example, often display the fictitious act in an attempt to protect themselves from arrest by being able to claim entrapment in court. In the statement, websites claim that it prevents organizations which may be associated with anti-P2P or government organizations from entering the site or network as it would breach the terms of the act.

According to the statement which many sites display, it was signed by Bill Clinton in 1995, but in reality he never signed the act as it never existed. Using this and other such "disclaimers" would actually make it easier for such a site to be found via the major search engines.

The text notice on these sites are usually as follows, but can vary:

If you are affiliated with any government, anti-piracy group or any other related group, or were formally a worker of one you CANNOT enter this web site, cannot access any of its files and you cannot view any of the HTML files. If you enter this site you are not agreeing to these terms and you are violating code 431.322.12 of the Internet Privacy Act signed by Bill Clinton in 1995 and that means that you CANNOT threaten our ISP(s) or any person(s) or company storing these files, and cannot prosecute any person(s) affiliated with this page which includes family, friends or individuals who run or enter this web site.

== History of usage ==
The false act was first displayed during the late 1990s on many sites that engaged in illegal activities, such as the promotion and distribution of "knock-off" (counterfeit) materials. Over time, the paragraph was picked up and copied and pasted with the exception of a few minor variations to match the content of the containing website. An example is provided below:

If you are affiliated with any government, police, anti-piracy group or other related group or working for Adidas, Manolo Blahnik, Converse, Louis Vuitton, Chanel, Burberry, Hermes, Prada, Air Jordan, Nike, Timberland, Gucci, Cartier, Oakley either directly or indirectly, or any other related group, or were formally a worker, you CANNOT enter these web pages, links, nor access any of its files and you cannot view any of the HTML files. If in fact you are affiliated or were affiliated with the above said companies, by entering this site you are not agreeing to these terms and you are violating code 431.322.12 of the Internet Privacy Act signed by Bill Clinton in 1995 and that means that you CANNOT threaten our ISP(s) or any person(s) or company storing these files, and cannot prosecute any person(s) affiliated with this website.

Through the turn of the century, thousands of web, FTP, and other sites used the statement in an attempt to deter authorities. It is sometimes still seen in modern file sharing networks and protocols. Other reasons for it might have been to reassure the visiting public that their actions and data would be somehow protected.
