= United States v. LaMacchia =

- Court: United States District Court for the District of Massachusetts
- Full case name: United States of America v. David LaMacchia
- Decided: 28 December 1994
- Citation: 871 F.Supp. 535

Holding
- Copyright prosecutions may only be brought under Section 506 of the Copyright Act, which does not include non-commercial copyright infringement within its scope.

Court membership
- Judge sitting: Justice Richard Stearns

Keywords
- NET Act, copyright infringement, LaMacchia Loophole, wire fraud, Copyright Act, Cynosure

United States v. LaMacchia 871 F.Supp. 535 (D.Mass. 1994) was a case decided by the United States District Court for the District of Massachusetts which ruled that, under the copyright and cybercrime laws effective at the time, committing copyright infringement for non-commercial motives could not be prosecuted under criminal copyright law.

The ruling gave rise to what became known as the LaMacchia Loophole which is that criminal charges of fraud or copyright infringement would be dismissed under current legal standards, so long as there was no profit motive involved. The court's ruling explicitly drew attention to a perceived shortcoming of the law that there was no criminal liability under the Copyright Act for even large-scale non-commercial copyright infringement. The NET Act, passed in 1997, was a direct response to the LaMacchia Loophole. The law provides for criminal prosecution of individuals who engage in copyright infringement even when there is no commercial benefit from the infringement.

== Facts ==
The defendant in the case was David LaMacchia, a 21-year-old student at the Massachusetts Institute of Technology at that time. Under pseudonyms and using an encrypted address, LaMacchia set up an electronic bulletin board which he dubbed Cynosure. He then encouraged people to upload copyrighted software applications and computer games to the board, which he subsequently transferred to another encrypted address called Cynosure II, where the software could be accessed and downloaded freely by anyone with access to the Cynosure password. LaMacchia encouraged his correspondents to exercise caution when accessing the site, but despite his best efforts to avoid detection, the heavy traffic to his site drew the attention of university and government authorities.

== Indictment and motion to dismiss ==
On April 7, 1994, LaMacchia was indicted by a federal grand jury for "conspiring with unknown people" to violate 18 U.S.C. Sec. 1343, the wire fraud statute. The indictment held that LaMacchia had devised a scheme to defraud the software manufacturers and copyright owners whose software had been distributed on Cynosure without paying proper licensing fees and royalties, thereby causing losses totaling over one million USD. There was no allegation that LaMacchia had derived any personal profit from the scheme, which is why the indictment was not made on grounds of copyright infringement.

In response to the indictment, LaMacchia brought a motion to dismiss on September 30, 1994, under the argument that the government was misapplying the wire fraud statute and attempting to use it as a copyright enforcement tool. LaMacchia made reference to Dowling v. United States, 473 U.S. 207 (1985) in his motion, arguing that the case held that "copyright prosecutions for alleged copyright infringement must be brought, if at all, under the Copyright Act, and cannot be brought under statutes enacted by Congress to prohibit interstate theft and fraud". The reasoning in Dowling v. United States was that the transfer of a copyright is different from the transfer of physical property in that unlike the owner of ordinary chattel, the holder of a copyright does not "acquire exclusive dominion over the thing owned". Therefore, LaMacchia argued, the prosecution must be brought under copyright law, and not under claims of wire fraud.

== Court decision ==
In its ruling, the court upheld the Dowling decision that copyright prosecutions should only be brought under Section 506 of the Copyright Act, which did not at the time apply to cases not involving commercial profit from infringement. Therefore, LaMacchia was not held liable for criminal copyright infringement under the wire fraud statute, and the case was concluded. This ruling does not preclude LaMacchia from being prosecuted under a civil suit as it specifically applies to criminal prosecution under the Copyright Act.

The court considered the wire fraud statute in analyzing the case. The wire fraud statute, 18 U.S.C. Sec. 1343, has jurisdiction over "any scheme or artifice to defraud, or for obtaining money or property by false or fraudulent pretenses, representations, or promises". The word "or" in this specification implies two separate offenses possible under the statute, the first of which is simply the devising of a scheme to defraud, and not necessarily an attempt to obtain money or property by false pretenses. Therefore, unlike 17 U.S.C. Sec. 506(a), which outlines the criminal copyright statute, wire fraud does not require a defendant to have sought personal profit in the scheme to defraud.

Remembering the Dowling precedent, the court considered that a nondisclosure or concealment of activities from copyright holders with the objective of depriving them of due royalties or licensing fees may serve as a basis for a fraudulent scheme. A stipulation was made that a "non-disclosure can only serve as a basis for a fraudulent scheme when there exists an independent duty that has been breached by the person so charged", which can include either a fiduciary duty or an explicit statutory duty. The court then found a fundamental difference between the cases of Dowling and LaMacchia. Neither party held any fiduciary duty to the copyright owners, but Dowling had a statutory duty as specified by the Copyright Act requiring that vendors notify copyright owners of any intention to manufacture and distribute song records (which were the physical goods in question). In the case of LaMacchia, however, no such independent statutory duty of disclosure exists because there was no analogous compulsory software licensing scheme. LaMacchia was therefore not guilty of defrauding the copyright holders, which addresses the claims of wire fraud.

== NET Act ==
Although the court ruled that the Supreme Court decision in Dowling v. United States precluded LaMacchia's prosecution for criminal copyright infringement, Justice Richard Stearns, while writing the memorandum, stated that "If the indictment is to be believed, one might at best describe [LaMacchia's] actions as heedlessly irresponsible, and at worst as nihilistic, self-indulgent, and lacking in any fundamental sense of values." He asserted that this ruling was a result of a shortcoming of copyright law and that it was the power of the legislature rather than the Court to modify the law to prevent such a crime from going unpunished. Stearns also said that it was impossible to prosecute LaMacchia under the then-present felony wire-fraud statutes unless the government made criminal "the myriad of home computer users who succumb to the temptation to copy even a single software program for private use."

The No Electronic Theft Act was passed in 1997 to close the LaMacchia loophole, modifying 17 U.S.C., Chapter 5, to include some forms of non-commercial infringement in its definition of criminal infringement. For example, if the infringer has made ten or more copies of one or more copyrighted works with a total retail value over $2,500 within a period of 180 days, even without any private gain, this would constitute a felony punishable by up to five years of imprisonment and/or a fine of up to $250,000.
