= World Anti-Piracy Observatory =

The World Anti-Piracy Observatory (WAPO) is a United Nations Educational, Scientific and Cultural Organization (UNESCO) program engineered to help combat copyright infringement, sometimes known as piracy. The program, approved in 2005 and initiated in January 2010, is the first web-based platform to gather and disseminate information about anti-infringement activities in the UNESCO Member States. A free, public service regularly updated by various partners, WAPO offers information in English, French and Spanish organized by country.
