= Media Piracy in Emerging Economies =

- Author: Joe Karaganis (ed.)
- Language: English
- Publisher: Social Science Research Council
- Publication place: United States; Canada
- Pages: 426
- ISBN: 978-0-9841257-4-6
- OCLC: 704907612

Media Piracy in Emerging Economies is a report released by the Social Science Research Council in 2011. It contends that “high prices for media goods, low incomes, and cheap digital technologies are the main ingredients of global media piracy. If piracy is ubiquitous in most parts of the world, it is because these conditions are ubiquitous.”

== Reception ==
The Guardian's Cory Doctorow commented that "This report and its researchers are rare examples of academic rigour in a world of special pleading and cooked industry statistics." Computerworld UK blogger Glyn Moody wrote that "Given the scope and rigour of this report, I think it will go down as a decisive moment when the discourse around piracy changed fundamentally, with the content industries being forced, finally, to explain and justify their methodologies, rather than simply stating their claimed results." Reuters' blogger Felix Salmon also hailed it as "The best report ever on media piracy". Canadian academic Michael Geist, writing in the Toronto Star, found that "While setting the record straight on piracy myths is valuable, the report's most important contribution comes from chronicling how piracy is primarily a function of market failure." Gilberto Gil, former culture minister of Brazil, was quoted saying the study is “required reading for anyone concerned with copyright and enforcement, or with the challenges of cultural globalization".

Magellan Media's founder Brian O'Leary invited to comment by O'Reilly Radar blogger Jenn Webb, was only in partial agreement with the report, noting that "Concerns about convenience, availability and usability (the absence of onerous rights restrictions) factor into individual decisions about what and whether to pirate media products. This doesn't refute the Social Science Research Council's claim that higher prices in lower-wealth countries can lead to piracy. It does suggest that it may not be enough to just lower prices. I do agree fully with the SSRC's conclusion that enforcement has limited impact." Ars Technica's Nate Anderson emphasized that the SSRC "report debunks alleged link between piracy and terrorism" put forward by a 2009 report of the RAND Corporation and funded by the motion picture business.
