= Dowling v. United States (1985) =

- Supreme Court of the United States

Argued April 17, 1985 Decided June 28, 1985
- Full case name: Paul Edmond Dowling v. United States
- Citations: 473 U.S. 207 (more) 105 S. Ct. 3127; 87 L. Ed. 2d 152; 226 U.S.P.Q. 529

Case history
- Prior: United States v. Dowling, 739 F.2d 1445 (9th Cir. 1984); cert. granted, 469 U.S. 1157 (1985).

Holding
- Copies of copyrighted works cannot be regarded as "stolen property" for the purposes of a prosecution under the National Stolen Property Act of 1934.

Court membership
- Chief Justice Warren E. Burger Associate Justices William J. Brennan Jr. · Byron White; Thurgood Marshall · Harry Blackmun; Lewis F. Powell Jr. · William Rehnquist; John P. Stevens · Sandra Day O'Connor

Case opinions
- Majority: Blackmun, joined by Brennan, Marshall, Rehnquist, Stevens, O'Connor
- Dissent: Powell, joined by Burger, White

Laws applied
- Copyright Act of 1976, National Stolen Property Act of 1934

Dowling v. United States, 473 U.S. 207 (1985), was a United States Supreme Court case that discussed whether copies of copyrighted works could be regarded as stolen property for the purposes of a law which criminalized the interstate transportation of property that had been "stolen, converted or taken by fraud" and holding that they could not be so regarded under that law.

== Background ==
Paul Edmond Dowling ran a bootleg recording business distributing Elvis Presley records through the United States Postal Service. Dowling, a zealous Presley fan, worked with William Samuel Theaker to produce records of unreleased Presley recordings such as those from concerts and television shows. The two men used the services of a record-pressing company in Burbank, Los Angeles County, California.

== Dowling's trial and appeals ==
The federal government brought its initial case against Dowling in the United States District Court for the Central District of California, arguing his guilt on the basis that he had no legal authority to distribute the records. Dowling was convicted of one count of conspiracy to transport stolen property in interstate commerce, eight counts of interstate transportation of stolen property, nine counts of copyright infringement, and three counts of mail fraud. The charges of mail fraud arose out of his use of the United States Postal Service to distribute the records.

Dowling appealed all convictions besides those of copyright infringement and the case moved to the Ninth Circuit Court of Appeals, where he argued that the goods he was distributing were not "stolen, converted or taken by fraud", according to the language of 18 U.S.C. 2314 - the interstate transportation statute under which he was convicted. The court disagreed, affirming the original decision and upholding the conviction. Dowling then took the case to the Supreme Court, which sided with his argument and reversed the convictions. From the Reporter of Decision's syllabus:

The phonorecords in question were not "stolen, converted or taken by fraud" for purposes of [section] 2314. The section's language clearly contemplates a physical identity between the items unlawfully obtained and those eventually transported, and hence some prior physical taking of the subject goods. Since the statutorily defined property rights of a copyright holder have a character distinct from the possessory interest of the owner of simple "goods, wares, [or] merchandise," interference with copyright does not easily equate with theft, conversion, or fraud. The infringer of a copyright does not assume physical control over the copyright nor wholly deprive its owner of its use. Infringement implicates a more complex set of property interests than does run-of-the-mill theft, conversion, or fraud.

== See also ==
- List of United States Supreme Court cases, volume 473
- United States v. LaMacchia, 871 F.Supp. 535 (D.Mass. 1994)
