= Creative work =

Term for the output of creative effort

A creative work is a manifestation of creative effort in the world through a creative process involving one or more individuals. The term includes fine artwork (sculpture, paintings, drawing, sketching, performance art), dance, writing (literature), filmmaking, and musical composition. The term is frequently used in the context of copyright. It is an important concept in both philosophy and law.

== Legal definition ==
=== United Kingdom ===
For the purpose of section 221(2)(c) of the Income Tax (Trading and Other Income) Act 2005, the expression "creative works" means:

(a) literary, dramatic, musical or artistic works, or
(b) designs,
created by the taxpayer personally or, if the qualifying trade, profession or vocation is carried on in partnership, by one or more of the partners personally.

== See also ==
- Art
- Creative industries
