= Legal document assistant =

Non-lawyer who helps prepare legal documents

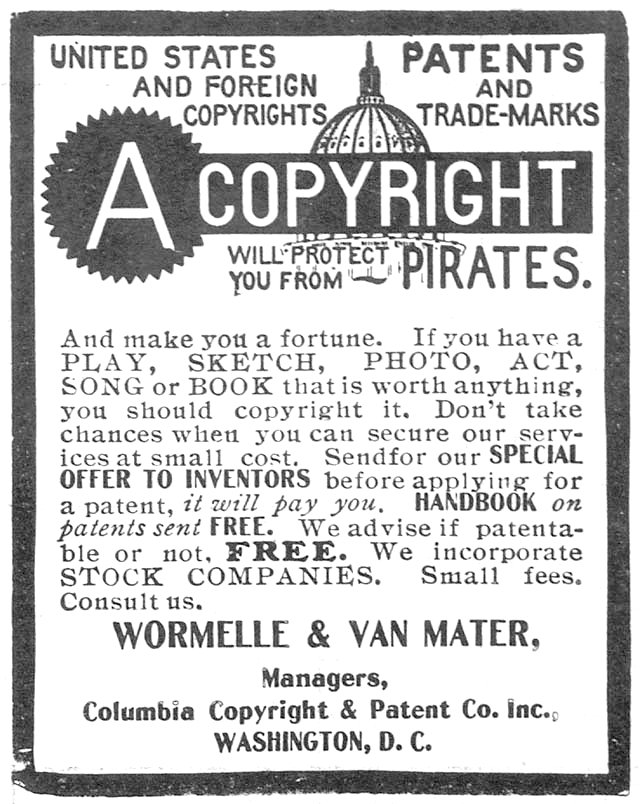
An advertisement for legal document services; this ad specifically talks about copyright registration (from the New York Clipper, 1906)

A legal document assistant (LDA, also known as "document technician", "legal document preparer", "legal technician", "online legal document provider", or "legal document clerk") in the United States is a person who is a non-lawyer but authorized to assist with the preparation of legal instruments. Where the distinction exists, legal document assistants provide services to the public and are (unlike paralegals) not obligated to work under the supervision of an attorney.

The existence of LDAs is a phenomenon in the U.S. due to the strict licensing laws for attorneys compared to elsewhere in the world. The job was created by using the doctrine of pro se to enable someone to help another to prepare a legal document. In every U.S. state, except for Louisiana and the territory of Puerto Rico, only an attorney can advise and draft a legal document for someone. With the self-help pro se concept and stock legal forms, the Legal Document Preparer profession arose.

The role of a Legal Document Assistant varies significantly across legal jurisdictions. The job performed by Legal Document Assistants may be lawful in one jurisdiction and prohibited in other jurisdictions.

== History ==
Many LDAs view their professional history as descending directly from that of the scribe or scrivener. The terms "legal scrivener" and "independent paralegal" were commonly used in the U.S. from the late 1970s until 1994. In that year, the Bankruptcy Reform Act was signed into law by President Bill Clinton. Among other provisions, it banned the use of the word "legal" in any form, to describe the services provided by non-attorney document preparers, and also specifically created the term "bankruptcy petition preparer". This forced many U.S. LDAs who assisted with bankruptcies to search for new terms to describe their profession.

Although California became the first state to formally regulate LDAs, the first licensing proposal was the Oregon Scrivener's Act, introduced into Oregon legislature in 1985. In 2003, Arizona began certifying individuals and businesses who prepare documents through its "Legal Document Preparer Program" as Certified Legal Document Preparers (CLDP).

== California ==
While many LDAs have paralegal education and experience, in California they are not the same as paralegals. Under California law, a paralegal is prohibited from providing services directly to the consumer. Paralegals may only be employed by an attorney, law firm, corporation, governmental agency, or other entity, and work under the direct supervision of a licensed attorney within the scope of that employment.

== Louisiana ==
Certain types of legal documents can be drafted by a notary public in the state of Louisiana. Louisiana notaries public prepare and draft legal documents of a noncontentious nature (i.e., not for court cases), such as wills, trusts, marriage contracts, articles of incorporation, estate inventories, mortgages, real estate sales contracts, powers of attorney. Aside from drafting, they are also authorized to make inventories, property descriptions, take company minutes, and appraise and convey real estate. Louisiana, along with Puerto Rico, has this exception because prior to inclusion in the United States, both were (and continue to be) under the civil law legal system. Under civil law, notaries are lawyers, which is why in Louisiana notaries are appointed for life and used to be licensed before the advent of practice of law statutes in the 1930s. Louisiana notaries public are not required to be attorneys or otherwise trained in law; however, they do have to pass an extensive exam on notarial law (i.e., the areas of law a notary can draft for – property law, estate law, family law, etc.), they must sign and witness the signing of the documents they draft (notarial acts), and register and file those documents with the local court.
