= Kaisha =

Kaisha or gaisha may refer to:

== Arts and entertainment ==
- Kaisha (The Sopranos), an episode of The Sopranos

== Japanese corporate law ==
- kaisha (会社) or gaisha, the Japanese word for "corporation"
- Kabushiki gaisha, a type of joint-stock company
- Gōdō gaisha, a type of limited liability company
- Gōmei gaisha, a type of unlimited partnership company
- Gōshi gaisha, a type of unlimited liability company
- Yūgen gaisha, a historic kind of limited liability company

== See also ==
- Law of Japan#Corporate law
