= Intermediary corporation =

An intermediary corporation or intermediate corporation (中間法人, chūkan hōjin) is a type of corporation which existed under Japanese law from 2002 until 2008. It was superseded by the general corporation (一般社団法人, ippan shadan hōjin) on December 1, 2008.

The intermediary corporation was designed to bridge the gap between companies which work for profits and NGO and other nonprofit organizations which work for public interest. Prior to the enforcement of the law on April 1, 2002, excepting the labor union whose establishing rules were regulated under specific laws, voluntary groups such as a condo association board and hobby club were operated under informal agreements and their assets were registered with one or more of group members. However, this meant that in the absence or negligence of the goodwill by the member registering assets, group's assets could be appropriated without becoming a criminal case. While they could be reclaimed through a civil suit, this does not resolve the problem of the ownership of assets. The intermediary corporation and its associated laws were designed to protect the group's assets while limiting the potential of lawsuits against individual members.

There were two types of intermediary corporations. Limited liability intermediary corporations (有限責任中間法人, yūgen sekinin chūkan hōjin) were designed to resemble yūgen kaisha (limited companies) in formation and function, while unlimited liability intermediary corporations (無限責任中間法人, mugen sekinin chūkan hōjin) were closer to gomei kaisha (general partnership corporations).

== See also ==
- Kabushiki kaisha
- Godo kaisha
- Mochibun kaisha
