= Mochibun kaisha =

Class of Japanese corporation

Mochibun kaisha (持分会社) are a class of corporations under Japanese law. While mochibun kaisha have legal personality as corporations, their internal functions are similar to partnerships, as they are both owned and operated by a single group of members (社員, shain).

== Types ==
There are three types of mochibun kaisha:

- Gōmei gaisha, in which all members have unlimited liability for the company's debts (similar to a general partnership)
- Gōshi gaisha, in which some members have unlimited liability and some have limited liability (similar to a limited partnership)
- Gōdō gaisha, in which all members have limited liability (very similar to a U.S. limited liability company)

Mochibun kaisha are formed by preparing articles of incorporation and depositing the articles with a local Legal Affairs Bureau.

The Japanese civil code also provides for partnerships (組合, kumiai), a different type of business organization. Civil code partnerships lack legal personality and are mainly used for investment funds and professional firms.

== See also ==
- Kabushiki kaisha
- Yugen kaisha
