= Joint-stock company =

Business entity owned by shareholders

A joint-stock company (JSC) is a business entity in which shares of the company's stock can be bought and sold by shareholders. Each shareholder owns company stock in proportion, evidenced by their shares (certificates of ownership). Shareholders are able to transfer their shares to others without any effects to the continued existence of the company.

In modern-day corporate law, the existence of a joint-stock company is often synonymous with incorporation (possession of legal personality separate from shareholders) and limited liability (shareholders are liable for the company's debts only to the value of the money they have invested in the company). Therefore, joint-stock companies are commonly known as corporations or limited companies.

Some jurisdictions still provide the possibility of registering joint-stock companies without limited liability. In the United Kingdom and in other countries that have adopted its model of company law, they are known as unlimited companies.

A joint-stock company is an artificial person; it has legal existence separate from persons composing it. It can own property, enter into contracts, and sue and can be sued in its own name. It is created by law, established for commercial purposes, and comprises a large number of members. The shares of each member can be purchased, sold, and transferred without the consent of other members. Its capital is divided into transferable shares, suitable for large undertakings. Joint stock companies have a perpetual succession and a common seal.

== Advantages ==
Ownership refers to a large number of privileges. The company is managed on behalf of the shareholders by a board of directors, elected at an annual general meeting.

The shareholders also vote to accept or reject an annual report and audited set of accounts. Individual shareholders can sometimes stand for directorships within the company if a vacancy occurs, but that is uncommon.

A joint-stock company also differs from other company forms, as it lacks internal ownership (hence its shareholders). This means that although the shareholder(s) in the joint-stock company may also work for the company as employees or by contract, when they act as shareholders they are always exterior to the company, which may help keep ownership business-oriented and impersonal.

Provided sales and assets exist within the company, a joint-stock company is effectively a forum for three- party trading: Owners, i.e. shareholders, are seeking financial funds (profits) and offer economic assets, in the form of capital. Employees, contractors and other contracted parties seek compensation and offer labor for this. Utilisers, ie customers, clients and other stakeholders, seek products and services, and offer financial funds for this.

The shareholders are usually not liable for any of the company debts that extend beyond the company's ability to pay up to the amount of them.

== Early joint-stock companies ==
=== China ===
The earliest records of joint-stock companies appear in China during the Tang and Song dynasties. The Tang dynasty saw the development of the heben, the earliest form of joint stock company with an active partner and one or two passive investors. By the Song dynasty this had expanded into the douniu, a large pool of shareholders with management in the hands of jingshang, merchants who operated their businesses using investors' funds, with investor compensation based on profit-sharing, reducing the risk of individual merchants and burdens of interest payment.

The operation of these joint investment partnerships can be examined in a mathematical problem included in the Mathematical treatise in nine sections (Shu-shu chiu-chang) (1247 ed.) of Ch'in Chiu-shao (c.1202–61). Although the dealings it describes are perhaps more complex than those practiced a century earlier, it essentially deals with a kind of investment and division of profits that for sure would have been made in the twelfth if not also the eleventh century: a four-party partnership that collectively made an investment (of 424,000 strings of cash) in a Chinese trading venture to southeast Asia. Each party's original investment consisted of precious metals like silver and gold and commodities like salt, paper, and monk certificates (and their accruing tax exemption). Yet the value of their individual investments varied considerably, as much as eightfold. Likewise, each party's share of the profits varied greatly, evidently in proportion to its overall share in the total investment. While social and family ties may have shaped the circle of potential coinvestors, they affected little, if at all, an investor's eventual share of the profits, or losses.

— Joseph P. McDermott and Shiba Yoshinobu

=== Europe ===
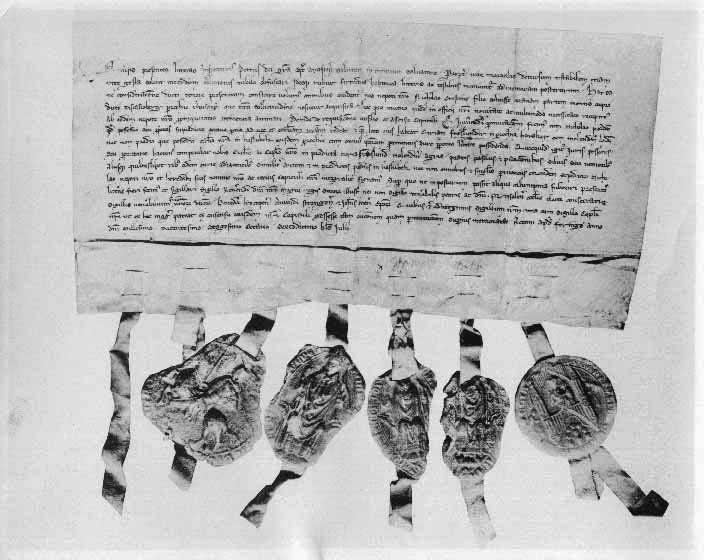
The transfer letter from 1288 through which Bishop Peter of Västerås reacquires an eighth of Tiskasjöberg, Kopparberget. The original can be found at Riksarkivet (National Archive) in Stockholm.

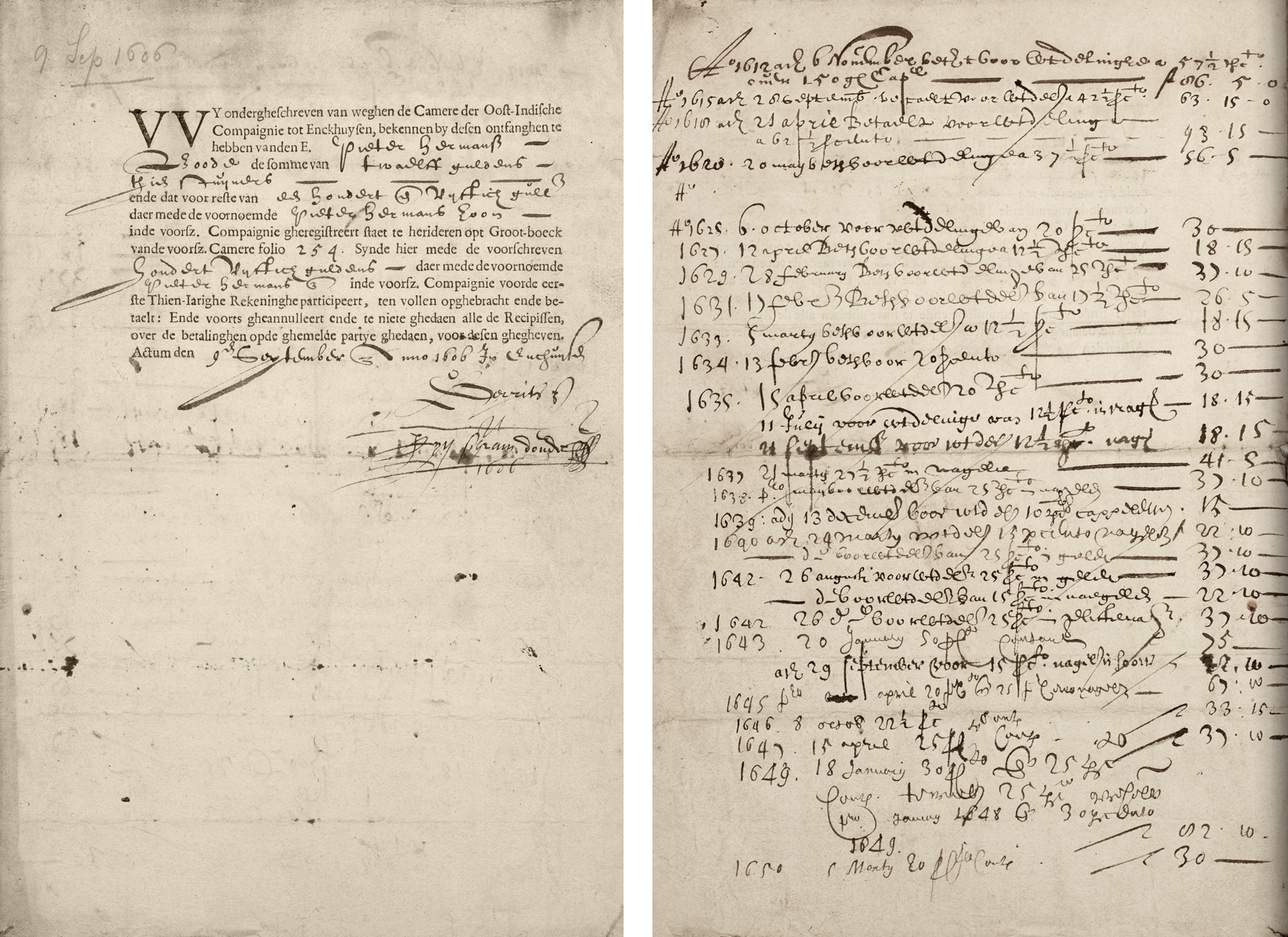
One of the oldest known stock certificates, issued by the VOC chamber of Enkhuizen, dated 9 Sep 1606

Finding the earliest joint-stock company is a matter of definition. An early form of joint-stock company was the medieval commenda, although it was usually employed for a single commercial expedition. Around 1350 in France at Toulouse, 96 shares of the Société des Moulins du Bazacle, or Bazacle Milling Company were traded at a value that depended on the profitability of the mills the society owned, making it probably the first company of its kind in history. The Swedish company Stora has documented a stock transfer for an eighth of the company (or more specifically, the mountain in which the copper resource was available) as early as 1288.

In more recent history, the earliest joint-stock company recognized in England was the Company of Merchant Adventurers to New Lands, founded in 1551 with 240 shareholders. It became the Muscovy Company, which had a monopoly on trade between Russia and England, when royal charter was granted in 1555. The most notable joint-stock company from the British Isles was the East India Company, which was granted a royal charter by Queen Elizabeth I on December 31, 1600 with the intention of establishing trade on the Indian subcontinent. The charter effectively granted the newly formed Honourable East India Company a fifteen-year monopoly on all English trade in the East Indies.

Soon afterwards, in 1602, the Dutch East India Company issued shares that were made tradable on the Amsterdam Stock Exchange. The development enhanced the ability of joint-stock companies to attract capital from investors, as they could now easily dispose of their shares. In 1612, it became the first 'corporation' in intercontinental trade with 'locked in' capital and limited liability. The joint-stock company became a more viable financial structure than previous guilds or state-regulated companies. The first joint-stock companies to be implemented in the Americas were the London Company and the Plymouth Company.

Transferable shares aim to achieve positive returns on equity, which is evidenced by investment in companies like the East India Company, which used the financing model to manage their trade on the Indian subcontinent. Joint-stock companies paid out divisions (dividends) to their shareholders by dividing up the profits of the voyage in the proportion of shares held. Divisions were usually cash, but when working capital was low and detrimental to the survival of the company, divisions were either postponed or paid out in remaining cargo, which could be sold by shareholders for profit.

The flag of the East India Company, which is speculated to have influenced the design of the Continental Union Flag

However, in general, incorporation was possible by royal charter or private act, and it was limited because of the government's jealous protection of the privileges and advantages thereby granted.

As a result of the rapid expansion of capital-intensive enterprises in the course of the Industrial Revolution in Europe and the United States, many businesses came to be operated as unincorporated associations or extended partnerships, with large numbers of members. Nevertheless, membership of such associations was usually for a short term so their nature was constantly changing.

Consequently, registration and incorporation of companies, without specific legislation, was introduced by the Joint Stock Companies Act 1844. Initially, companies incorporated under this Act did not have limited liability, but it became common for companies to include a limited liability clause in their internal rules. In the case of Hallett v Dowdall, the Court of the Exchequer held that such clauses bound people who have notice of them. Four years later, the Joint Stock Companies Act 1856 provided for limited liability for all joint-stock companies provided, among other things, that they included the word "limited" in their company name. The landmark case of Salomon v A Salomon & Co Ltd established that a company with legal liability, not being a partnership, had a distinct legal personality that was separate from that of its individual shareholders.

== Corporate law ==
The existence of a corporation requires a special legal framework and body of law that specifically grants the corporation legal personality, and it typically views a corporation as a fictional person, a legal person, or a moral person (as opposed to a natural person) which shields its owners (shareholders) from "corporate" losses or liabilities; losses are limited to the number of shares owned. It furthermore creates an inducement to new investors (marketable stocks and future stock issuance). Corporate statutes typically empower corporations to own property, sign binding contracts, and pay taxes in a capacity separate from that of its shareholders, who are sometimes referred to as "members". The corporation is also empowered to borrow money, both conventionally and directly to the public, by issuing interest-bearing bonds. Corporations subsist indefinitely; "death" comes only by absorption (takeover) or bankruptcy. According to Lord Chancellor Haldane,

...a corporation is an abstraction. It has no mind of its own any more than it has a body of its own; its active and directing will must consequently be sought in the person of somebody who is really the directing mind and will of the corporation, the very ego and centre of the personality of the corporation.

— Lennard's Carrying Co Ltd v Asiatic Petroleum Co Ltd [1915] AC 705

This 'directing will' is embodied in a corporate Board of Directors. The legal personality has two economic implications. It grants creditors (as opposed to shareholders or employees) priority over the corporate assets upon liquidation. Second, corporate assets cannot be withdrawn by its shareholders, and assets of the firm cannot be taken by personal creditors of its shareholders. The second feature requires special legislation and a special legal framework, as it cannot be reproduced via standard contract law.

The regulations most favorable to incorporation include:

Regulation	Description
Limited liability	Unlike a partnership or sole proprietorship, shareholders of a modern business corporation have "limited" liability for the corporation's debts and obligations. As a result, their losses cannot exceed the amount that they contributed to the corporation as dues or payment for shares. That enables corporations to "socialize their costs" for the primary benefit of shareholders; to socialize a cost is to spread it to society in general. The economic rationale is that it allows anonymous trading in the shares of the corporation by eliminating the corporation's creditors as a stakeholder in such a transaction. Without limited liability, a creditor would probably not allow any share to be sold to a buyer less creditworthy than the seller. Limited liability further allows corporations to raise large amounts of finance for their enterprises by combining funds from many owners of stock. Limited liability reduces the amount that a shareholder can lose in a company. That increases the attraction to potential shareholders and so increases both the number of willing shareholders and the amount they are likely to invest. However, some jurisdictions also permit another type of corporation in which shareholders' liability is unlimited, for example the unlimited liability corporation in two provinces of Canada, and the unlimited company in the United Kingdom.
Perpetual lifetime	Another advantage is that the assets and structure of the corporation may continue beyond the lifetimes of its shareholders and bondholders. That allows stability and the accumulation of capital, which is thus available for investment in larger and longer-lasting projects than if the corporate assets were subject to dissolution and distribution. That was also important in medieval times, when land donated to the Church (a corporation) would not generate the feudal fees that a lord could claim upon a landholder's death: see Statute of Mortmain. (However a corporation can be dissolved by a government authority by putting an end to its existence as a legal entity. That rarely happens unless the company breaks the law, for example, fails to meet annual filing requirements or, in certain circumstances, if the company requests dissolution.)

=== Financial disclosure ===
In many jurisdictions, corporations whose shareholders benefit from limited liability are required to publish annual financial statements and other data so that creditors who do business with the corporation are able to assess the creditworthiness of the corporation and cannot enforce claims against shareholders. Shareholders, therefore, experience some loss of privacy in return for limited liability. That requirement generally applies in Europe, but not in common law jurisdictions, except for publicly traded corporations (for which financial disclosure is required for investor protection).

=== Corporate taxation ===
In many countries, corporate profits are taxed at a corporate tax rate, and dividends paid to shareholders are taxed at a separate rate. Such a system is sometimes referred to as "double taxation" because any profits distributed to shareholders will eventually be taxed twice. One solution, followed by as in the case of the Australian and UK tax systems, is for the recipient of the dividend to be entitled to a tax credit to address the fact that the profits represented by the dividend have already been taxed. The company profit being passed on is thus effectively taxed only at the rate of tax paid by the eventual recipient of the dividend.

In other systems, dividends are taxed at a lower rate than other income (for example, in the US), or shareholders are taxed directly on the corporation's profits, while dividends are not taxed (for example, S corporations in the US).

== Closely held corporations and publicly traded corporations ==
The institution most often referenced by the word "corporation" is publicly traded, which means that the company's shares are traded on a public stock exchange (for example, the New York Stock Exchange or Nasdaq in the United States) whose shares of stock of corporations are bought and sold by and to the general public. Most of the largest businesses in the world are publicly traded corporations.

However, the majority of corporations are privately held, or closely held, so there is no ready market for the trading of shares. Many such corporations are owned and managed by a small group of businesspeople or companies, but the size of such a corporation can be as vast as the largest public corporations. Likewise, a corporation can be owned by the government (or jointly by multiple governments), creating a state-owned enterprise.

Closely held corporations have some advantages over publicly traded corporations. A small, closely held company can often make company-changing decisions much more rapidly than a publicly traded company, as there will generally be fewer voting shareholders, and the shareholders would have common interests. A publicly traded company is also at the mercy of the market, with capital flow in and out based not only on what the company is doing but also on what the market and even what the competitors, major and minor, are doing.

However, publicly traded companies also have advantages over their closely held counterparts. Publicly traded companies often have more working capital and can delegate debt throughout all shareholders. Therefore, shareholders of publicly traded company will each take a much smaller hit to their returns as opposed to those involved with a closely held corporation. Publicly traded companies, however, can suffer from that advantage. A closely held corporation can often voluntarily take a hit to profit with little to no repercussions if it is not a sustained loss. A publicly traded company often comes under extreme scrutiny if profit and growth are not evident to stock holders, thus stock holders may sell, further damaging the company. Often, that blow is enough to make a small public company fail.

Often, communities benefit from a closely held company more so than from a public company. A closely held company is far more likely to stay in a single place that has treated it well even if that means going through hard times. Shareholders can incur some of the damage the company may receive from a bad year or slow period in the company profits. Closely held companies often have a better relationship with workers. In larger, publicly traded companies, often after only one bad year, the first area to feel the effects is the workforce with layoffs or worker hours, wages or benefits being cut. Again, in a closely held business the shareholders can incur the profit damage rather than passing it to the workers.

The affairs of publicly traded and closely held corporations are similar in many respects. The main difference in most countries is that publicly traded corporations have the burden of complying with additional securities laws, which (especially in the US) may require additional periodic disclosure (with more stringent requirements), stricter corporate governance standards as well as additional procedural obligations in connection with major corporate transactions (for example, mergers) or events (for example, elections of directors). A closely held corporation may be a subsidiary of another corporation (its parent company), which may itself be either a closely held or a public corporation. In some jurisdictions, the subsidiary of a listed public corporation is also defined as a public corporation (for example, in Australia).

== By countries ==
=== Australia ===
In Australia corporations are registered and regulated by the Commonwealth Government through the Australian Securities and Investments Commission. Corporations law has been largely codified in the Corporations Act 2001.

=== Brazil ===
In Brazil there are many different types of legal entities (sociedades), but the two most common ones commercially speaking are (i) sociedade limitada, identified by "Ltda." or "Limitada" after the company's name, equivalent to the British limited liability company, and (ii) sociedade anônima or companhia, identified by "SA" or "Companhia" in the company's name, equivalent to the British public limited company. The "Ltda." is mainly governed by the new Civil Code, enacted in 2002, and the "SA", by Law 6.404, dated December 15, 1976, as amended.

=== Bosnia and Herzegovina ===
In Bosnia and Herzegovina, a joint-stock company is called:

- dioničko društvo (often abbreviated d.d. or D.D.) in both the Bosnian language and the Croatian language, while the Serbian language uses:
- akcionarsko društvo (often abbreviated a.d. or A.D. - Cyrillic alphabet : акционарско друштво or а.д.).

The specified form of organization means that the company (private or state-owned) is organized on the Bosnian market (Federation of BiH and RS entity level) as a legal entity that has shares (Bosnian/Croatian: dionica or vrijednosni papir; Serbian: akcija or hartija od vrijednosti - Cyrillic: акција or хартија од вриједности) that can be traded in a free market or stock exchanges in the Bosnia and Herzegovina (listed in Sarajevo Stock Exchange or Banja Luka Stock Exchange).

=== Bulgaria ===
In Bulgaria, a joint-stock company is called a aktsionerno druzhestvo or AD (Bulgarian: акционерно дружество or АД). When all shares are owned by a single shareholder the company receives the special designation of ednolichno aktsionerno druzhestvo or EAD (Bulgarian: еднолично акционерно дружество or ЕАД).

=== Canada ===
In Canada both the federal government and the provinces have corporate statutes, and thus a corporation may be incorporated either provincially or federally. Many older corporations in Canada stem from Acts of Parliament passed before the introduction of general corporation law. The oldest corporation in Canada is the Hudson's Bay Company; though its business has always been based in Canada, its Royal Charter was issued in England by King Charles II in 1670, and became a Canadian charter by amendment in 1970 when it moved its corporate headquarters from London to Canada. Federally recognized corporations are regulated by the Canada Business Corporations Act.

=== Chile ===
The Chilean form of joint-stock company is called Sociedad por Acciones (often abbreviated "SpA"). They were created in 2007 by Law N° 20.190, and they are the most recent variety of societary types, as they represent a simplified form of corporation – originally conceived for venture capital companies.

According to the Ministry of Economy's Business and Society Registry, SpAs accounted for 71.42% of new businesses in October 2023.

=== Czech Republic and Slovakia ===
The Czech form of the public limited company is called akciová společnost (a.s.) and its private counterpart is called společnost s ručením omezeným (s.r.o.). Their Slovak equivalents are called akciová spoločnosť (a.s.) and spoločnosť s ručením obmedzeným (s.r.o.).

=== German-speaking countries ===
Germany, Austria, Switzerland and Liechtenstein recognize two forms of company limited by shares: the Aktiengesellschaft (AG), analogous to public limited companies (or corporations in US/Can) in the English-speaking world, and the Gesellschaft mit beschränkter Haftung (GmbH), similar to the modern private limited company.

=== Italy ===
Italy recognizes three types of company limited by shares: the public limited company (società per azioni, or S.p.A.), the private limited company (società a responsabilità limitata, or S.r.l.), and the publicly traded partnership (società in accomandita per azioni, or S.a.p.a.). The latter is a hybrid of the limited partnership and public limited company, having two categories of shareholders, some with and some without limited liability, and is rarely used in practice.

=== Japan ===
In Japan, both the state and local public entities under the Local Autonomy Act (now 47 prefectures, made in the 19th century and municipalities) are considered to be corporations (法人, hōjin). Non-profit corporations may be established under the Civil Code.

The term "company" (会社, kaisha) or (企業 kigyō) is used to refer to business corporations. The predominant form is the Kabushiki gaisha (株式会社), used by public corporations as well as smaller enterprises. Mochibun kaisha (持分会社), a form for smaller enterprises, are becoming increasingly common. Between 2002 and 2008, the intermediary corporation (中間法人, chūkan hōjin) existed to bridge the gap between for-profit companies and non-governmental and non-profit organizations.

=== Latvia ===
In Latvia, which uses a model similar to Germany, a public stock company is called an akciju sabiedrība (a/s, A/S or AS), whereas a private, 'limited liability company' is called a sabiedrība ar ierobežotu atbildību (SIA). State-owned variants of these companies add an initial capital V (valsts - 'state'), as in VAS and VSIA.

=== Norway ===
In Norway, a joint-stock company is called an aksjeselskap, abbreviated AS. A special and by far less common form of joint-stock companies, intended for companies with a large number of shareholders, is the publicly traded joint-stock companies, called allmennaksjeselskap and abbreviated ASA. A joint-stock company must be incorporated, has an independent legal personality and limited liability, and is required to have a certain capital upon incorporation. Ordinary joint-stock companies must have a minimum capital of NOK 30,000 upon incorporation, which was reduced from 100,000 in 2012. Publicly traded joint-stock companies must have a minimum capital of NOK 1 million.

=== Poland ===
Spółka Akcyjna (S.A.) ("Joint-stock company") in Polish

=== Spain ===
In Spain there are two types of companies with limited liability: (i) "S.L.", or Sociedad Limitada (a private limited company), and (ii) "S.A.", or Sociedad Anónima (similar to a public limited company).

=== Ukraine ===
The Ukrainian form of the private limited company is called товариство з обмеженою відповідальністю: abbr. ТОВ (TOV) or ТзОВ (TzOV), lit.: "partnership with limited liability".

Several types of joint stock companies (Ukrainian: Акціонерне товариство, lit. 'joint stock partnership', Aktsionerne tovarystvo, AT) exist in Ukraine. Due to specifics of the Soviet economy, all enterprises in the Soviet republic as the rest of the Soviet Union were state owned and private entrepreneurship was strictly prohibited and criminally prosecuted. Following the Gorbachev initiated broad spectrum reforms (perestroika), there was introduced a term of khozraschet and permission for organization of public economic entities called cooperatives.

Following the dissolution of the Soviet Union, Ukraine's economy, along with those of the rest of the former Soviet republics, was further liberalized. Along with private entrepreneurship, many state owned companies were privatized, primarily by the former party's apparatchiks which gave a rise of another term "Red directors". Many companies started to be sold at open market and commercialized. Those companies were transformed in joint-stock companies by selling their shares for mutual cooperation and investment.

As in the rest of the former Soviet republics (predominantly Russia), the following types of commercial companies were created in Ukraine:

- National joint-stock company, NJSC (Ukrainian: НАК, romanized: NAK)
- Open joint-stock company, OJSC (Ukrainian: ВАТ, romanized: VAT)
- Closed joint-stock company, CJSC (Ukrainian: ЗАТ, romanized: ZAT)

In 2009 further reforms were introduced and open joint-stock companies were forced to be restructured as public joint-stock company (Ukrainian: Публічне акціонерне товариство, romanized: PAT, Publichne aktsionerne tovarystvo) or private joint-stock company (Ukrainian: Приватне акціонерне товариство, romanized: PrAT, Pryvatne aktsionerne tovarystvo).

Minimum amount of share capital is 1,250 minimum wages (as of 1 January 2017 ₴4,000,000 or US$148,000).

Ukraine National Securities and Stock Market Commission is the main stock market state authority.

=== United Kingdom ===
Most companies are regulated by the Companies Act 2006. The most common type of company is the private limited company ("Limited" or "Ltd"). Private limited companies can either be limited by shares or by guarantee. Other corporate forms include the public limited company ("plc") and the private unlimited company.

Some corporations, both public and private sector, are formed by Royal Charter or Act of Parliament.

A special type of corporation is a corporation sole, which is an office held by an individual natural person (the incumbent), but which has a continuing legal entity separate from that person.

=== United States ===
Several types of conventional corporations exist in the United States. Generically, any business entity that is recognized as distinct from the people who own it (i.e., is not a sole proprietorship or a partnership) is a corporation. This generic label includes entities that are known by such legal labels as 'association', 'organization' and 'limited liability company', as well as corporations proper. Only a company that has been formally incorporated according to the laws of a particular state is called a "corporation." A corporation was defined in the Dartmouth College case of 1819, in which Chief Justice Marshall of the United States Supreme Court stated: "A corporation is an artificial being, invisible, intangible, and existing only in contemplation of the law." A corporation is a legal entity, distinct and separate from the individuals who create and operate it. As a legal entity the corporation can acquire, own, and dispose of property in its own name like buildings, land and equipment. It can also incur liabilities and enter into contracts like franchising and leasing. American corporations can be either profit-making companies or non-profit entities. Tax-exempt non-profit corporations are often called "501(c)3 corporations," after the section of the Internal Revenue Code that addresses the tax exemption for many of them. In some states, such as Colorado, a corporation may represent itself pro se in courts of law in some situations. The federal government can only create corporate entities pursuant to relevant powers in the U.S. Constitution. Thus, virtually all corporations in the U.S. are incorporated under the laws of a particular state. A major exception to the federal non-participation in the incorporation of private businesses is in banking; under the National Bank Act, banks may receive charters from the federal government as national banks, subjecting them to the regulation of the federal Office of the Comptroller of the Currency rather than state banking regulators.

All states have some kind of "general corporation law" (California, Delaware, Kansas, Nevada and Ohio actually use that exact name) which authorizes the formation of private corporations without having to obtain a charter for each one from the state legislature (as was formerly the case in the 19th century). Many states have separate, self-contained laws authorizing the formation and operation of certain specific types of corporations that are wholly independent of the state general corporation law. For example, in California, nonprofit corporations are incorporated under the Nonprofit Corporation Law, and in Illinois, insurers are incorporated under the Illinois Insurance Code.

Corporations are created by filing the requisite documents with a particular state government. The process is called "incorporation", referring to the abstract concept of clothing the entity with a "veil" of artificial personhood (embodying, or "corporating" it, 'corpus' being the Latin word for 'body'). Only certain corporations, including banks, are chartered. Others simply file their articles of incorporation with the state government as part of a registration process.

Once incorporated, a corporation has artificial personhood everywhere it may operate, until such time as the corporation may be dissolved. A corporation that operates in one state while being incorporated in another is a "foreign corporation". This label also applies to corporations incorporated outside of the United States. Foreign corporations must usually register with the secretary of state's office in each state to lawfully conduct business in that state.

A corporation is legally a citizen of the state (or other jurisdiction) in which it is incorporated (except when circumstances direct the corporation be classified as a citizen of the state in which it has its head office, or the state in which it does the majority of its business). Corporate business law differs dramatically from state to state. Many prospective corporations choose to incorporate in a state whose laws are most favorable to its business interests. Many large corporations are incorporated in Delaware, for example, without being physically located there because that state has very favorable corporate tax and disclosure laws.

Companies set up for privacy or asset protection often incorporate in Nevada, which does not require disclosure of share ownership. Many states, particularly smaller ones, have modeled their corporate statutes after the Model Business Corporation Act, one of many model sets of law prepared and published by the American Bar Association.

As juristic persons, corporations have certain rights that attach to natural persons. The vast majority of them attach to corporations under state law, especially the law of the state in which the company is incorporated – since the corporations very existence is predicated on the laws of that state. A few rights also attach by federal constitutional and statutory law, but they are few and far between compared to the rights of natural persons. For example, a corporation has the personal right to bring a lawsuit (as well as the capacity to be sued) and, like a natural person, a corporation can be libeled.

Harvard College, an undergraduate school of Harvard University, formally the President and Fellows of Harvard College (also known as the Harvard Corporation), is the oldest corporation in the western hemisphere. Founded in 1636, the second of Harvard's two governing boards was incorporated by the Great and General Court of Massachusetts in 1650. Significantly, Massachusetts itself was a corporate colony at that time – owned and operated by the Massachusetts Bay Company (until it lost its charter in 1684) – so Harvard College is a corporation created by a corporation.

Many nations have modeled their own corporate laws on American business law. Corporate law in Saudi Arabia, for example, follows the model of New York State corporate law. In addition to typical corporations in the United States, the federal government, in 1971 passed the Alaska Native Claims Settlement Act (ANCSA), which authorized the creation of 12 regional native corporations for Alaska Natives and over 200 village corporations that were entitled to a settlement of land and cash. In addition to the 12 regional corporations, the legislation permitted a 13th regional corporation without a land settlement for those Alaska Natives living out of the State of Alaska at the time of passage of ANCSA.

== Other business entities ==
Almost every recognized type of organization carries out some economic activities (for example, the family). Other organizations that may carry out activities that are generally considered to be business exist under the laws of various countries:

- Consumers' cooperative
- Holding company
- Limited company (Ltd)
- Limited liability company (LLC)
- Limited liability limited partnership (LLLP)
- Limited liability partnership (LLP)
- Limited partnership (LP)
- Low-profit limited liability company (L3C)
- Not-for-profit corporation
- Open joint-stock company (OJSC)
- Partnership
- Sole proprietorship
- Trust company

== See also ==
- Aktieselskab
- Public–private partnership
