= Canadian property law =

Canadian property law, or property law in Canada, is the body of law concerning the rights of individuals over land, objects, and expression within Canada. It encompasses personal property, real property, and intellectual property. The laws vary between municipal, provincial and federal levels of government. The form of purchase can vary from sale to different types of leases, whilst property transactions can be made through a physical paper form or digitally.

== Property law description ==
In Canada, each province and territorial government has its own statutes for real estate, but within the same legal framework for the country which is based on the older English common law. Whilst Quebec's code (CCQ) is based on civil law, which was once based upon the older Napoleonic Code. Foreign laws may be considered under certain circumstances, as international laws are allowed in Canadian courts. The country has government statues, the Investment Canada Act, and Competition Act as well as the provincial laws in place throughout Canada's 10 provinces and 3 territories. The buying and selling of property is normally conducted through a real estate agent who work on a financial commission and act as a broker between buyer and seller. As well as brokers, the sale of property can be made with the aid of a lawyers (commercial sales), notaries (Quebec), surveyors, title insurers or third party consultants.

Whilst property is private, in Canada, there isn't a constitutional protection of property right, as the government can force an owner to sell them their land through expropriation, where compensation will be given based on the market value of the land.

A buyer will often need permission through a municipal planning firm, and could require a survey on a potential flood threat, depending on the location of a development with building permits required, and in some cases environment permits and other licenses from a local, provincial or federal agency. For instance, in Toronto there is the need for the preservation of historic sites, and the city has designated buildings because of their heritage, cultural or historical significance, whilst the city also provides tax break for specific conservation projects under the Ontario Heritage Act. Then, there is also the case of the need to ensure the property is compliant with environmental laws and standard, as in the property in question must be a safe environment. The National Energy Code of Canada for buildings 2011 was created in coordination with LEED (green energy) and BOMA BESt (Building Environmental Standards) which look after environmental issues for buildings.

== Ownership ==
Each of Canada's provinces and territories have their own property laws. Despite the fact there are no restrictions regarding taxes and registration and reporting requirements within the laws, there are differences regarding property licenses in the provinces of Ontario, Quebec and British Columbia. There are transfer taxes, and in recent years, different provinces have enacted a new foreign taxation policy to restrict a non-Canadian resident from investing in the country, i.e. in 2017, the cities of Toronto and Vancouver have imposed a 15% transfer tax rate on the sales of homes to foreign residents without Canadian citizenship, and Vancouver did pass a 1% vacancy tax on empty properties. Whilst bigger cities have changed the laws because of an influx of foreign buyers, other provinces have made even stricter rules on the ownership of land by non-residents of Canada, i.e. provinces have imposed the Land Protection Act and the Agricultural and Reactional Land Ownership Act, which have been renewed in restrict the purchase of land by non-residents of Canada.

=== Sale and purchase ===
The sale of a property or land in Canada must be done with a deed of land, which is accepted upon sale, be it physical or electronic, whilst Quebec additionally asks for the endorsement of a notary. The general sale of property comes with a buyer beware guide (Latin: caveat emptor) with three classification; firstly, owner must disclosed the full extent of the quality of the property; secondly, potential environmental contamination must be clear; thirdly, the law does not accommodate to the full extent for fraud. To facilitate the sale of property, a buyer can lend money from a licensed individual as a mortgage broker, or a lender which are regulated by a government act in 2006. There are several common options available for a mortgaged home owner in Canada, they include a power of sale; judicial sale, action on covenant (lawsuit); and possession. Again, Quebec has a separate remedy, including the purchase through a secured creditor, and also the option of a judicial authority. Then, in case of the scenario, if the lender were to cease to exist, it would have to give notice under the federal bankruptcy legislation.

The sale and transfer of property in Canada can be done through a provincial level or in some differing jurisdiction cases, a municipal level. Then, each province has its over land transfer tax rate. The transaction needs to be registered with the registry office to be completed, or again in some cases at a local municipality. With commercial property being subject to a different tax rate than private property. With commercial leases varying between provinces under either a gross (monthly fixed rent) or let (full amount) lease.

=== Leases ===
Of Canada's provinces, 9 are part of the Residential Tenancies Act in place for controlling rent leases. Then, in Quebec, article 1892 of the civil code regulates the leases. The individual leases have terms and conditions agreed upon by the tenant and landlord, with a Landlord and tenant board supervising the processes in court cases.

==== Foreign ownership law ====
On January 1, 2023, Canada enacted a law prohibiting foreigners, except for immigrants and permanent residents, from acquiring residential areas in the country for two years in response to a real-estate bubble.

== Rights ==
=== Hold rights ===
An owner can acquire a property through either a freehold or leasehold (exclusive possession), and can either a co-ownership, common or joint tenancy, which allows for property to be held for a specific amount of time. As well as a hold, a tenant in the Canadian property market can gain a contract for easement (right of way), restrictive covenants (specific manner), or in servitude (burden to another). Whilst in Quebec, usufruct, servitudes, superficies (above ground i.e. condo), and emphyteusis (period of time) are the types of rights for land. Then a license allows the owner to use the land in the terms agreed in the contract.

=== Titles ===
In between provinces, there are differences in the legal and beneficial titles, e.g. in Alberta, a beneficial owner can split the property and register a caveat, showing an interest only as opposed to whole ownership. But, normally beneficiaries are not recorded in the paperwork. That despite all land in Canada is required to be registered to a public land registry or a registry system or both. In cases of fraud, the Canadian legal system can accommodate a limited recovery of money, that is without any insurance coverage. With ownership registration, each province has its own rules for the title granted for registering with laws varying for fraud upon the sale of personal property.

== Canadian registries ==
There are numerous registries operating in different jurisdictions in Canada operating within their own rules. The provinces of British Columbia, Alberta and Saskatchewan operate on a similar land titles system, whilst the registry system applies to Prince Edward Island and Newfoundland and Labrador with a similar system in Quebec. Then Ontario mostly uses a land titles system from previously using the registry system. Land titles are also used in Manitoba, Nova Scotia and New Brunswick.

=== Physical or electronic ===
In Canada, different provinces have enacted different requirement to register property (land registry), as in on a physical sheet of paper, or now digitally on an electronic device, but a registration is mandatory no matter what for legal purposes, all of which need to be accessed at a centralized government land registry office.

== Personal property ==
Personal property laws are typically governed by provincial legislation such as the provincial Sale of Goods Acts. Likewise, the common law rules inherited from the United Kingdom are largely still in force. Real property law is likewise a matter of provincial legislation with the incorporation of English common law rules, except in Quebec, where French civil law is foundational.

== Intellectual property ==
Intellectual property, as with most common law countries, remains entirely based in federal statute; however, there are common-law economic torts related to intellectual property, e.g., passing off. Canada tried to take the middle road between the United Kingdom and the United States in many of their intellectual property laws. Copyright law and trademark law in Canada was initially based on the English legislation but has since incorporated many changes from the US model and other places. Canadian patent law, however, was initially based on US legislation but has typically favoured the application of UK case law.

== Sources ==
- Morpeth, Iain (2017). "6". The International Comparative Legal Guide to: Real Estate 2018 (PDF). London: Rory Smith. pp. 30–40. ISBN 978-1-911367-86-4.
