= Japan In-House Lawyers Association =

- Abbreviation: JILA
- Formation
- Type: Non-governmental organization
- Purpose: Professional society
- Headquarters: Tokyo, Japan

The Japan In-House Lawyers Association "JILA" (日本組織内弁護士協会) is the largest organization serving the professional and business interests of attorneys who practice in the legal departments of corporations, associations, other private-sector organizations, and national and municipal governments in Japan.

== See also ==
- Law of Japan
