= Gōdō gaisha =

Type of business organization in Japan

A gōdō gaisha (合同会社), or gōdō kaisha, abbreviated GK, is a type of business organization in the Companies Act of Japan modeled after the American limited liability company (LLC). It is often referred to as the "Japanese LLC" (日本版LLC, Nihon-ban LLC). It is a type of mochibun kaisha (corporation having a simplified internal structure like that of a partnership) distinguished by offering limited liability for all investors.

== Background ==
Gōdō gaisha was introduced by the Companies Act, which became effective on May 1, 2006, replacing yūgen gaisha.

== Basic structure ==
A GK is formed by articles of incorporation (定款, teikan) signed between its investors, called members (社員, shain). Each member may provide a capital contribution in the form of money or property. Credit and promises to perform services are not valid considerations for an ownership interest in a GK.

Following ratification of the agreement, the GK's articles of incorporation and corporate seal must be registered with the Legal Affairs Bureau (法務局, hōmukyoku). Once the bureau processes the registration, the company may open a bank account, seal contracts, and engage in other activities as a legal entity.

The members may, either in the agreement or pursuant to the agreement, choose one or more executive manager (業務執行社員, gyōmu shikkō shain) from among their ranks. This executive manager can be either an individual or a corporation; however, corporate executive managers must appoint at least one functional manager (職務執行者, shokumu shikkō sha) to perform the actual management duties.

The legal duties of GK managers are very similar to the legal duties of KK directors. GK members may sue managers in the same way that KK shareholders may sue directors on the company's behalf.

A GK may be converted to a KK with the unanimous consent of all of its members.

== Distinguishing characteristics ==
The following traits distinguish godo gaisha from kabushiki gaisha:

- All members must consent to the amendment of the articles of incorporation unless the articles of incorporation provide otherwise. (In a KK, only a supermajority of shareholders is required.)
- All members must consent to any transfer of ownership unless the articles of incorporation provide otherwise. (In a KK, the transfer of shares is unlimited by default.)
- All members are representatives of the company by default unless managers have been appointed. (In a KK, only the Representative Director represents the company.)
- Major business decisions (such as large asset sales or winding up of the company) may be made informally. (In a KK, resolutions of shareholder and board meetings are often required for such decisions).
- Members may invest any type of asset in exchange for their interest. (In a KK, non-cash contributions require an appraisal supervised by a court.)
- Because KKs traditionally required a larger capital and procedural investment, GKs did not initially have the same level of prestige. That has changed with many large foreign companies, including Apple, Google, ExxonMobil, Amazon and Walmart (through Seiyu), opting for GKs in Japan.

== Taxation ==
GKs are taxed as corporations under Japanese law: the company's profits are taxed at corporate tax rates, and dividends are taxed at individual tax rates.

In late 2005, following the passage of the Companies Act, the Ministry of Economy, Trade, and Industry pressed the Ministry of Finance to treat GKs as "pass-through entities" in which only company profits would be taxed. However, the Ministry of Finance refused to allow such treatment. As a result, many new companies are expected to use the more prestigious KK business form rather than the GK business form, especially given the looser regulation of KKs under the new law. The only limited liability business which receives pass-through tax treatment in Japan is the limited liability partnership.

Under United States tax law, gōdō gaisha are not classified as corporations, and are therefore eligible to make an entity classification election: a single-member GK may be treated as an extension of its member and a multi-member GK may follow the tax rules for partnerships.

== See also ==
- Gōmei gaisha
- Gōshi gaisha
- Kabushiki gaisha
