= Gōshi gaisha =

Japanese limited partnership company

A gōshi gaisha (合資会社) is a type of "unlimited liability" incorporation under the Companies Act of Japan, but its structure is similar to that of a limited partnership. Unlike the other types of corporate structure (gōdō gaisha and kabushiki gaisha), there is no limit on what a general partner (無限責任社員, mugen sekinin shain) of the company is legally responsible for.

== Structure ==
In a gōshi gaisha, partners are divided into two categories: (1) a general partner who has unlimited liability similar to a partner in a general partnership and (2) a limited partner who has limited liability only up to the amount he has invested in the partnership (limited partner). All partners are still directly liable to creditors of the partnership, and thus partners can still be sued individually (direct liability).
