= Company =

Association or collection of individuals

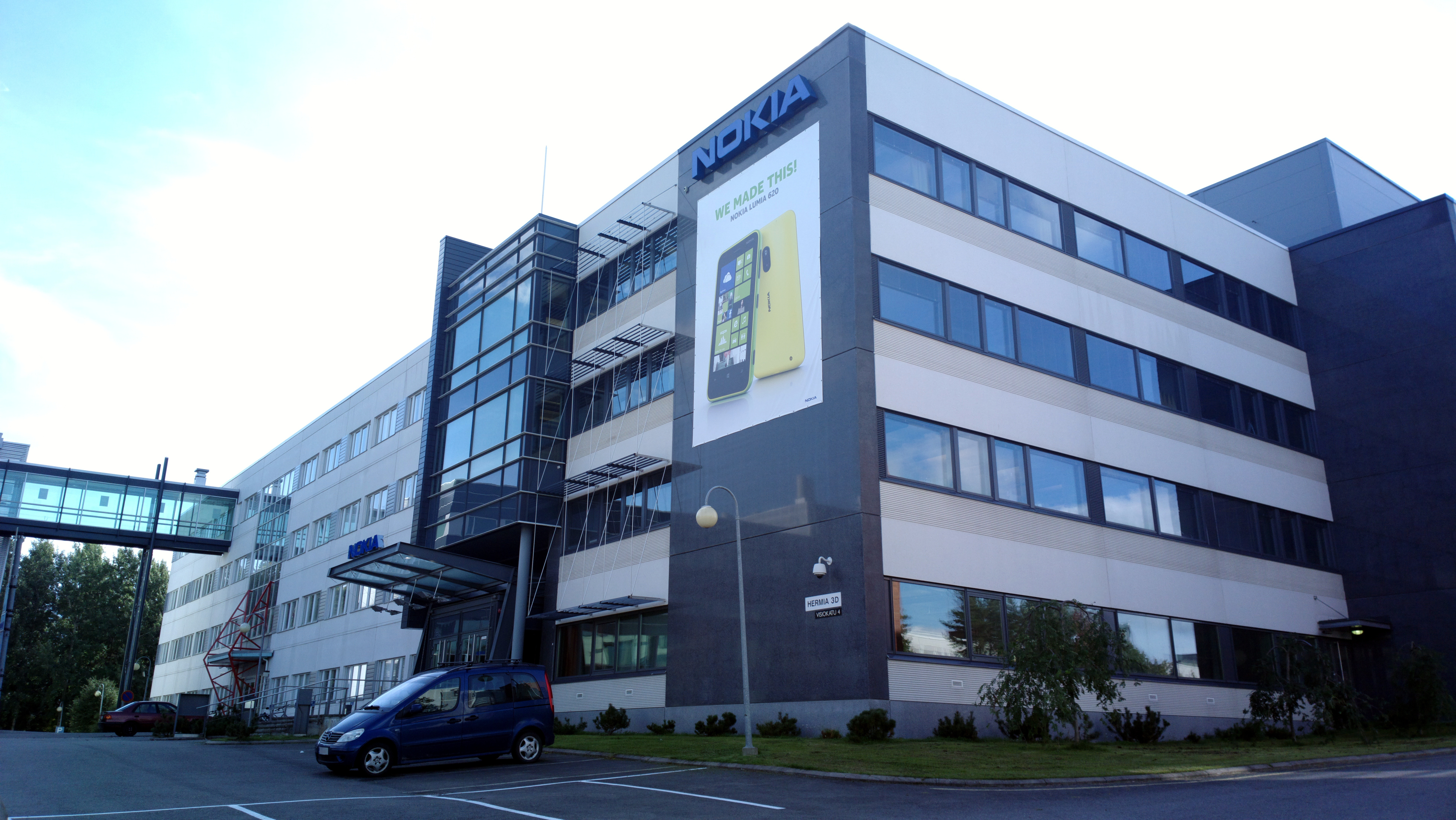
An office building of Nokia Corporation in Hervanta, Tampere, Finland

A company is a legal entity representing an association of legal persons with a shared objective, such as generating profit or benefiting society. Depending on the jurisdiction, companies can take on various forms, including voluntary associations, nonprofit organizations, business entities, financial entities, banks, and educational institutions. Companies have evolved to share common legal features, such as a separate legal personality, limited liability, transferable shares, investor ownership, and a managerial hierarchy.

The term "company" may or may not be synonymous with corporation, partnership, firm, or society. Companies are governed by company law, also referred to as corporate law in many regions. Incorporated companies are created through state registration, whereas unincorporated companies are not.

When a company closes, it may undergo liquidation to settle its affairs and terminate its legal obligations. Additionally, companies may associate to form corporate groups, which are collections of parent and subsidiary corporations.

== History ==
English law recognised long ago that a corporation would have separate legal personality, also known as corporate personality or juridical personhood. In 1612, Sir Edward Coke remarked in the Case of Sutton's Hospital,

the Corporation itself is onely in abstracto, and resteth onely in intendment and consideration of the Law; for a Corporation aggregate of many is invisible, immortal, & resteth only in intendment and consideration of the Law; and therefore it cannot have predecessor nor successor. They may not commit treason, nor be outlawed, nor excommunicate, for they have no souls, neither can they appear in person, but by Attorney. A Corporation aggregate of many cannot do fealty, for an invisible body cannot be in person, nor can swear, it is not subject to imbecilities, or death of the natural, body, and divers other cases.

In 1776, Adam Smith wrote in the Wealth of Nations that mass corporate activity could not match private entrepreneurship, because people in charge of "other people's money" would not exercise as much care as they would with their own.

In 1843, William Gladstone took chairmanship of a Parliamentary Committee on Joint Stock Companies, which led to the Joint Stock Companies Act 1844.

=== United States ===
At the end of the 19th century in the United States, the law allowed for the concentration of wealth and power in the hands of a few people, or a single person. In response, the Sherman Antitrust Act of 1890 was created to break up big business conglomerates, and the Clayton Act of 1914 gave the government power to halt mergers and acquisitions that could damage the public interest. By the end of the First World War, it was increasingly perceived that ordinary people had little voice compared to the "financial oligarchy" of bankers and industrial magnates. In particular, employees lacked voice compared to shareholders, but plans for a post-war "industrial democracy" (giving employees votes for investing their labor) did not become widespread.

The Wall Street crash of 1929 saw the total collapse of stock market values, as shareholders realized that corporations had become overpriced. They sold shares en masse, meaning many companies found it hard to get finance. The result was that thousands of businesses were forced to close, and they laid off workers. Because workers had less money to spend, businesses received less income, leading to more closures and lay-offs. This downward spiral began the Great Depression. This led directly to the New Deal reforms of the Securities Act of 1933 and Securities and Exchange Act of 1934. A new Securities and Exchange Commission was empowered to require corporations disclose all material information about their business to the investing public.

After World War II, a general consensus emerged that directors were not bound purely to pursue "shareholder value" but could exercise their discretion for the good of all stakeholders, for instance by increasing wages instead of dividends, or providing services for the good of the community instead of only pursuing profits, if it was in the interests of the enterprise as a whole. However, different states had different corporate laws. To increase revenue from corporate tax, individual states had an incentive to lower their standards in a "race to the bottom" to attract corporations to set up their headquarters in the state, particularly where directors controlled the decision to incorporate. "Charter competition", by the 1960s, had led Delaware to become home to the majority of the largest US corporations. This meant that the case law of the Delaware Chancery and Supreme Court became increasingly influential.

During the 1980s, a huge takeover and merger boom decreased directors' accountability. To fend off a takeover, courts allowed boards to institute "poison pills" or "shareholder rights plans", which allowed directors to veto any bid – and probably get a payout for letting a takeover happen. More and more people's retirement savings were being invested into the stock market, through pension funds, life insurance and mutual funds. This resulted in a vast growth in the asset management industry, which tended to take control of voting rights. Both the financial sector's share of income, and executive pay for chief executive officers began to rise far beyond real wages for the rest of the workforce. The Enron scandal of 2001 led to some reforms in the Sarbanes-Oxley Act (on separating auditors from consultancy work). The 2008 financial crisis led to minor changes in the Dodd-Frank Act (on soft regulation of pay, alongside derivative markets). However, the basic shape of corporate law in the United States has remained the same since the 1980s.

== Terminology and definition ==
A company can be defined as an "artificial person", invisible, intangible, created by or under law, with a discrete legal capacity (or "personality"), perpetual succession, and a common seal. Except for some senior positions, companies remain unaffected by the death, insanity, or insolvency of an individual member.

=== Etymology ===
The English word, "company", has its origins in the Old French term compagnie (first recorded in 1150), meaning "society, friendship, intimacy; body of soldiers", which came from the Late Latin word companio ("one who eats bread with you"), first attested in the Salic law (c. AD 500) as a calque of the Germanic expression gahlaibo (literally, "with bread"), related to Old High German galeipo ("companion") and to Gothic gahlaiba ("messmate").

=== Semantics and usage ===
By 1303, the word company referred to trade guilds. The usage of the term company to mean "business association" was first recorded in the 1550s, and the abbreviation "co." dates from 1769.

In English law, a company is a body corporate or corporation company registered under the Companies Acts or under similar legislation.

=== Nomenclature ===
- Limited and unlimited companies
  - A limited company is a "company in which the liability of each shareholder is limited to the amount individually invested". An unlimited company is a company with no limit on the liability of its members.
- Private and public companies
  - A public company is a company whose shares may be traded publicly.

== Types ==
Common types of companies include:

- Nonprofit organizations
  - Company limited by guarantee
  - Charitable incorporated organisation
  - Society
  - Unions
    - Trade union
    - Credit union
  - Cooperative
  - Non-governmental organization
  - Religious organization
  - Educational institution
- Businesses
  - Partnerships
    - Limited partnership
      - Limited liability partnership
      - Limited liability limited partnership
    - General partnership
  - Limited companies
    - Equity sharing
      - Company limited by shares
      - Joint-stock company
      - Private limited company
      - Public companies
        - Public limited company
    - Limited liability company
  - Unlimited company
  - Corporation
  - Conglomerates
  - Privately held company
    - Chaebol
    - Corporate group
    - Holding company
    - Subsidiary
  - By industry
    - Bank
    - Investment fund
    - Venture capital company
    - Professional company
      - Law firm
      - Accounting firm
  - Other entities
    - Special-purpose acquisition company
    - Special-purpose entity
    - Trusts
    - Shell corporation
    - Shelf corporation
- Unincorporated associations
  - Reciprocal inter-insurance exchange
  - Sole proprietorship
- Government
  - Statutory corporation
  - State-owned enterprise
  - Sovereign wealth fund
  - Public–private partnership

== See also ==
- List of company registers
- List of largest employers
- Lists of companies
