= Kinchu narabini kuge shohatto =

Kinchu narabini kuge shohatto (禁中並公家諸法度), sometimes known in English as the Laws for the Imperial and Court Officials, was a law issued by the Tokugawa Shogunate in 1615, to set out its relationship with the Imperial family and the kuge (imperial court officials). It was issued soon after the Laws for the Military Houses (buke shohatto 武家諸法度), which regulated the daimyo (feudal lords) and the rest of the samurai class, and the Laws on Religious Establishments (jiin shohatto 寺院諸法度).

The law specified that the Emperor should dedicate to scholarship and poetry. It also included provisions on the ranks, promotion and costume of the court aristocracy. Traditional interpretations saw the law as trying to minimize the political power of the court, although an alternative interpretation says that it meant to restore the court's authority from poverty and scandal.
