= Superficies =

Latin legal term

Superficies is a Latin legal term referring to anything which is placed upon and attached to the ground, and most commonly refers to a building erected on land owned by another.

== Roman law ==
Under Roman law, ownership of a building was considered inseparable from ownership of the land beneath it. A person with the right to use the land for a superficies, known as a superficarius, enjoyed a right to use the superficies, bequeath it to his heirs and encumber it, despite not "owning" it outright. The right was known as a Jus Superficiarium.

== Countries of European Union ==
Under the headline of Building Leases, a report on Real Property Law within the European Union describes separate statutory rights in rem called rights of superficie, bail à construction, building leases, or Erbbaurecht, which entitle to full ownership of buildings erected on (including above or below) foreign ground for long periods.

== The Netherlands ==
The right of superficies is a real property right which enables its proprietor - the superficiary - to have or obtain for himself buildings, constructions or plants in, on or above an immovable thing owned by someone else (Article 5:101 (1) Dutch Civil Code). .. .. A right of superficies may in addition serve to obtain the ownership of pipes, cables and tubes under or above someone else's land.

== Romanian law ==
A new Civil Code of Romania defines Superficies as follows: the right to have or to erect a building on someone other's land, above or under ground of that land, on which the superficiary acquires a right of use (art. 693).

== Japanese law ==
Japanese law provides for a similar right, known as chijōken (地上権; lit. "above-ground rights") in Japanese and officially translated as "superficies".

The right is defined under Article 265 of the Civil Code as the right to use the land of another for the purpose of owning buildings, trees or bamboo. A superficies is not limited to these purposes however. For example, subway companies in Japan obtain a superficies for their right to travel under properties belonging to others.

A superficies may also be created by operation of law when a mortgage is foreclosed. If the foreclosure leads to the land and building(s) thereon falling under separate ownership, but the land and building(s) were owned by the same person when the mortgage was created, then a "statutory superficies" (法定地上権, hōtei chijōken) is automatically created to facilitate separate ownership of the building(s).

Unlike a land lease, a superficies is considered to be a property right, can be indefinite in duration, imposes no upkeep obligations on the landowner, and is freely transferable without the landowner's consent. The rights and obligations of the parties are primarily determined by the contents of the superficies agreement.

== Thai law ==
Superficies in Thailand is a legal right that allows a person to own buildings or structures on land they do not own. This concept is rooted in Roman law and was later adopted into the Thai Civil and Commercial Code. The purpose of superficies is to promote land use and development without transferring land ownership. This right can be granted through a written agreement and registered at the Land Office, typically lasting up to 30 years or for the lifetime of the owner. Superficies is commonly used in Thailand for long-term property investments, providing security for developers while maintaining land ownership with the original landowner.

== South Korean law ==
The equivalent right under South Korean law is called jisang-gwon (지상권). It can be found in Article 279 of the Civil Code of the Republic of Korea.

== German law ==
In German law the corresponding right is known as "Erbbaurecht" and governed by the ErbbauRG.
