= Unlimited company =

Company where shareholders/members have unlimited legal liability

An unlimited company or private unlimited company is a hybrid company (corporation) incorporated with or without a share capital (and similar to its limited company counterpart) but where the legal liability of the members or shareholders is not limited: that is, its members or shareholders have a joint and several non-limited obligation to meet any insufficiency in the assets of the company to enable settlement of any outstanding financial liability in the event of the company's formal liquidation.

== Characteristics ==
The joint and several non-limited liability of the members or shareholders of such an unlimited company to meet any insufficiency in the assets of the company (to settle its outstanding liabilities if any exist) applies only upon the formal liquidation of the company. Therefore, prior to any such formal liquidation of the company, any creditors or security holders of the company may have recourse only to the assets of the company, not those of its members or shareholders.

Until such an event occurs (formal liquidation), an unlimited company is similar to its counterpart—the limited company, in which its members or shareholders have no direct liability to the creditors or security holders of the company during its normal course of business or existence.

Unlimited companies are found in the United Kingdom, Ireland, Hong Kong, Pakistan, Nigeria, India, Australia, New Zealand and other jurisdictions where the company law is derived from English law. They can also be found in Germany, France, Macao, Czech Republic and in three jurisdictions in Canada (Alberta, British Columbia, and Nova Scotia), where they are called unlimited liability corporations. In the United Kingdom, the "private unlimited company" is formed or incorporated by registration under the Companies Act 2006, of which there are a few thousand such companies on the register, similar in volume to the public limited company, but in contrast to the millions of private limited companies registered.

An unlimited company has the benefit and status of incorporation, the same as its limited company counterpart. Situations for which an unlimited company will be preferred to an alternative business model or its limited company counterpart include these:

- Secrecy concerning financial affairs is desired, effectively shielding and protecting its financial affairs from public, media and competitor analysis, making them non-public information, including shareholder dividend payments: a United Kingdom unlimited company, unlike its limited company counterpart, is by the very nature of its legal liability generally not required to publish or make public its company financial statements (file its annual financial accounts at Companies House).
- The company is active or trading in an area where limited liability is not acceptable, vital or practical, but anonymity and perpetual succession are important.
- Extending, in general, a greater assurance and confidence to creditors and trade financial transactions, in contrast to its limited company counterpart.
- There is a low risk of insolvency for creditors.
- The company or its trading activity has or generates sufficient capital, funds or financing without need to approach general lenders such as high-street retail banks.
- Developing more advantageous company and business capital strategies in an ever-increasing irreversible trend of bank disintermediation by companies and their management.
- A focused higher standard of board of directors and executive management behaviour (or probity) and business model for risk management.
- A flow-through entity is required for United States federal tax purposes, under the entity classification rules.

Once formed or incorporated, an unlimited company can, in some jurisdictions, also re-register and designate itself to limited company status at any time with few formalities, the same also extending to a limited company, which may at any time re-register and designate itself to unlimited company status.

== Examples ==
=== Ireland ===
In Ireland, local subsidiaries of a number of American companies have registered as private unlimited companies, enabling them to shield their finances from public disclosure, media and competitor analysis. Janssen Pharmaceutical, a subsidiary of its US parent company Johnson & Johnson, re-registered as an unlimited company to avoid the requirement to file annual financial accounts at the Companies Registration Office (CRO) of Ireland, thereby effectively also protecting a portion of Johnson & Johnson's financial information. A number of Irish European Union subsidiaries of Apple Inc. did the same, such as Apple Sales International and Apple Retail Europe, as have a number of other Irish European Union subsidiaries of American companies, such as Etsy, Google, Dropbox, LinkedIn and Airbnb Ireland UC.

=== Other regions ===
Some other global trading companies such as Mobil Producing Nigeria Unlimited (a subsidiary of Exxon Mobil) and Texaco Overseas (Nigeria) Petroleum Company Unlimited (part of the merged Chevron and Texaco petroleum conglomerates) exist in Nigeria, amongst others. In the USA, another example is the American Express Company, which once was a publicly traded unlimited liability company, re-incorporating itself with limited liability company status only in 1965.
