= Law of Japan =

The law of Japan is primarily based on legal codes and statutes, with precedents also playing an important role. Japan has a civil law legal system with six legal codes, which were greatly influenced by Germany, to a lesser extent by France, and also adapted to Japanese circumstances. The Japanese Constitution enacted after World War II is the supreme law in Japan. An independent judiciary has the power to review laws and government acts for constitutionality.

== Historical developments ==
=== Early Japan ===
The early laws of Japan are believed to have been heavily influenced by Chinese law. Little is known about Japanese law prior to the seventh century, when the Ritsuryō was developed and codified. Before Chinese characters were adopted and adapted by the Japanese, the Japanese had no known writing system with which to record their history. Chinese characters were known to the Japanese in earlier centuries, but the process of assimilation of these characters into their indigenous language system took place in the third century. This was due to the willingness of the Japanese to borrow aspects of the culture of continental civilisations, which was achieved mainly via adjacent countries such as the Korean kingdoms rather than directly from Chinese empires.

Two of the most significant systems of human philosophy and religion, Confucianism and Buddhism, were officially transplanted in 284–285 and 522 AD respectively, and became deeply acculturated into indigenous Japanese thought and ethics. David and Zweigert and Kotz argue that the old Chinese doctrines of Confucius, which emphasize social/group/community harmony rather than individual interests, have been very influential in the Japanese society, with the consequence that individuals tend to avoid litigation in favour of compromise and conciliation.

It is theorized by some that the flow of immigrants was accelerated by both internal and external circumstances. The external factors were the continuing political instability and turmoil in Korea, as well as the struggle for central hegemony amongst the Chinese dynasties, kingdoms, warlords, invasions and other quarrels. These disturbances produced a large number of refugees who were exiled or forced to escape from their homelands. Immigrants to Japan may have included privileged classes, such as experienced officials and excellent technicians who were hired in the Japanese court, and were included in the official rank system which had been introduced by the immigrants themselves. It is conceivable – but unknown – that other legal institutions were also introduced, although partially rather than systematically, and this was probably the first transplantation of foreign law to Japan.

During these periods, Japanese law was unwritten and immature, and thus was far from comprising any official legal system. Nonetheless, Japanese society could not have functioned without some sort of law, however unofficial. Glimpses of the law regulating people's social lives may be guessed at by considering the few contemporary general descriptions in Chinese historical books. The most noted of these is The Record on the Men of Wa, which was found in the Wei History, describing the Japanese state called Yamatai (or Yamato) ruled by the Queen Himiko in the second and third centuries. According to this account, Japanese indigenous law was based on the clan system, with each clan forming a collective unit of Japanese society. A clan comprised extended families and was controlled by its chief, who protected the rights of the members and enforced their duties with occasional punishments for crimes. The law of the court organised the clan chiefs into an effective power structure, in order to control the whole of society through the clan system. The form of these laws is not clearly known, but they may be characterised as indigenous and unofficial, as official power can rarely be identified.

In this period, a more powerful polity and a more developed legal system than the unofficial clan law of the struggling clan chiefs was required effectively to govern the society as a whole. Yamatai must have been the first central government which succeeded in securing the required power through the leadership of Queen Himiko, who was reputed to be a shaman. This leads to the assertion that Yamatai had its own primitive system of law, perhaps court law, which enabled it to maintain government over competing clan laws. As a result, the whole legal system formed a primitive legal pluralism of court law and clan law. It can also be asserted that this whole legal system was ideologically founded on the indigenous postulate which adhered to the shamanistic religio-political belief in polytheistic gods and which was called kami and later developed into Shintoism.

Two qualifications can be added to these assertions. First, some Korean law must have been transplanted, albeit unsystematically; this can be seen by the rank system in court law and the local customs among settled immigrants. Second, official law was not clearly distinguished from unofficial law; this was due to the lack of written formalities, although court law was gradually emerging into a formal state law as far as central government was concerned. For these reasons, it cannot be denied that a primitive legal pluralism had developed based on court and clan law, partially with Korean law and overwhelmingly with indigenous law. These traits of legal pluralism, however primitive, were the prototype of the Japanese legal system which developed in later periods into more organised legal pluralisms.

=== Ritsuryō system ===
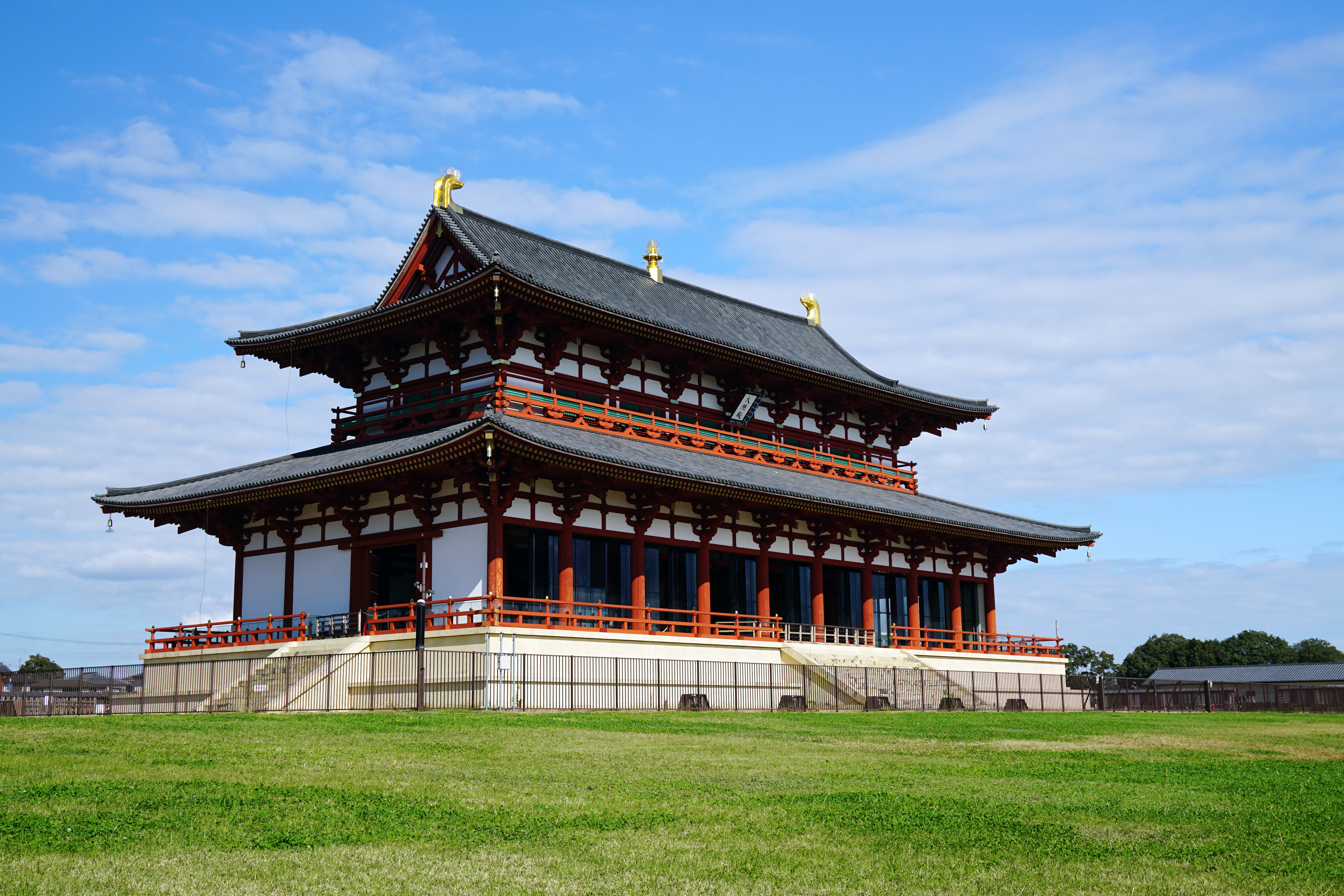
The Daigokuden, the main building to Heijo Palace, which was an imperial palace modeled after Tang China palaces in the Nara period

In 604, Prince Shotoku established the Seventeenth-article Constitution, which differed from modern constitutions in that it was also moral code for the bureaucracy and aristocracy. While it was influenced by Buddhism, it also showed a desire to establish a political system centered on the emperor, with the help of a coalition of noble families. Nevertheless, there are doubts that the document was fabricated later.

Japan began to dispatch envoys to China's Sui Dynasty in 607. Later, in 630, the first Japanese envoy to the Tang Dynasty was dispatched. The envoys learned of Tang Dynasty's laws, as a mechanism to support China's centralized state. Based on the Tang code, various systems of law, known as the Ritsuryō (律令), were enacted in Japan, especially during the Taika Reform. Ritsu (律) is the equivalent of today's criminal law, while ryō (令) provides for administrative organization, taxation, and corvée (the people's labor obligations), similar to today's administrative law. Other provisions correspond to modern family law and procedural law. Ritsuryō was strongly influenced by Confucian ethics. Unlike Roman law, there was no concept of private law and there was no direct mentioning of contracts and other private law concepts.

One major reform on the law was the Taihō (Great Law) Code, promulgated in 702. Within the central government, the law codes established offices of the Daijō daijin (chancellor), who presided over the Dajōkan (Grand Council of State), which included the Minister of the Left, the Minister of the Right, eight central government ministries, and a prestigious Ministry of Deities. These ritsuryō positions would be mostly preserved until the Meiji Restoration, although substantive power would for a long time fall to the bakufu (shogunate) established by the samurai. Locally, Japan was reorganized into 66 imperial provinces and 592 counties, with appointed governors.

=== Laws under the shogunates ===
Beginning in the 9th century, the Ritsuryo system began to break down. As the power of the manor lords (荘園領主) grew stronger, the manor lords' estate laws (本所法, honjohō) began to develop. Furthermore, as the power of the samurai rose, samurai laws (武家法, bukehō)) came to be established. In the early Kamakura period, the power of the imperial court in Kyoto remained strong, and a dual legal order existed with samurai laws and Kuge laws (公家法, kugehō), the latter having developed on the basis of old Ritsuryo laws.

In 1232, Hojo Yasutoki of the Kamakura Shogunate established the Goseibai Shikimoku, a body of samurai laws consisting of precedents, reasons and customs in samurai society from the time of Minamoto no Yoritomo, and which clarified the standards for judging the settlement of disputes between gokenin and between gokenin and manor lords. It was the first systematic code for the samurai class. Later, the Ashikaga shogunate more or less adopted the Goseibai Shikimoku as well.

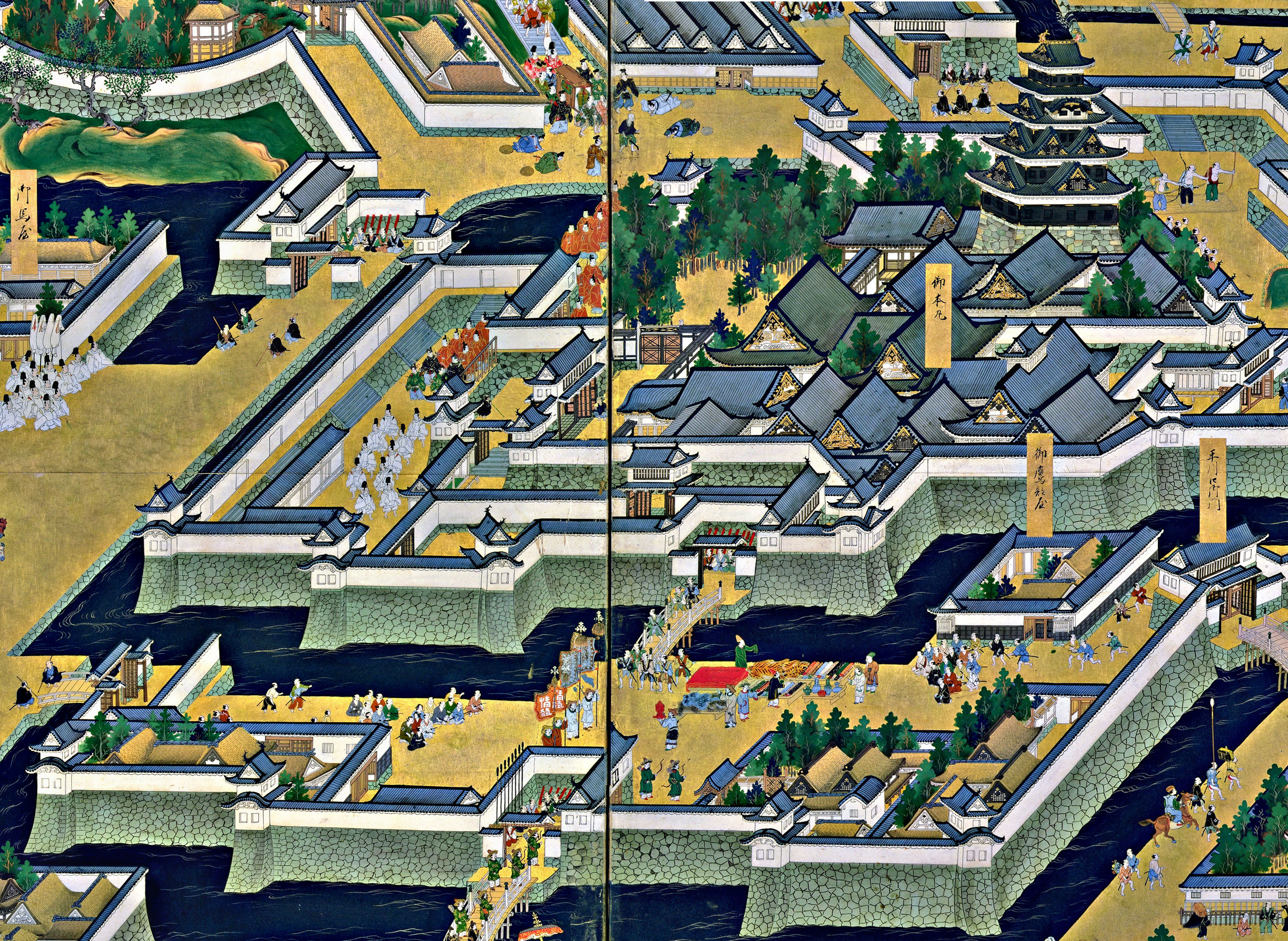
Edo Castle with surrounding residential palaces and moats, from a 17th-century screen painting

In the Sengoku period (1467–1615), the daimyos developed feudal laws (分国法, bunkokuhō) in order to establish order in their respective territories. Most such laws sought to improve the military and economic power of the warring lords, including instituting the rakuichi rakuza (楽市・楽座) policy, which dissolved guilds and allowed some free marketplaces, and the principle of kenka ryōseibai (喧嘩両成敗), which punished both sides involved in brawls.

In the Edo period (1603–1868), the Tokugawa shogunate established the bakuhan taisei (幕藩体制), a feudal political system. The shogunate also promulgated laws and collection of precedents, such as the Laws for the Military Houses (武家諸法度, Buke shohatto) and the Kujikata Osadamegaki (公事方御定書). It also issued the Laws for the Imperial and Court Officials (禁中並公家諸法度, kinchū narabini kuge shohatto), which set out the relationship between the shogunate, the imperial family and the kuge, and the Laws on Religious Establishments (寺院諸法度, jiin shohatto)).

The Code of One Hundred Articles (御定書百箇条, osadamegaki hyakkajyō)) was part of the Kujikata Osadamegaki. It consisted of mostly criminal laws and precedents, and was compiled and issued in 1742, under the eighth Tokugawa shogun, Yoshimune. Crimes punished include forgery, harboring runaway servants, abandonment of infants, adultery, gambling, theft, receiving stolen goods, kidnapping, blackmailing, arson, killing and wounding. Punishment ranged from banishment to various forms of execution, the most lenient of which is decapitation; others include burning at the stake and public sawing before execution. The justice system often employed torture as a means to obtain a confession, which was required for executions. Punishment was often extended to the culprit's family as well as the culprit.

Justice in the Edo period was very much based on one's status. Following neo-Confucian ideas, the populace was divided into classes, with the samurai on top. Central power was exercised to various degrees by the shogun and shogunate officials, who were appointed from the daimyo, similar to the Curia Regis of medieval England. Certain conducts of daimyos and the samurai were subject to the shogunate's laws, and shogunate administrative officials would perform judicial functions. Daimyos had considerable autonomy within their domains (han) and issued their own edicts. Daimyos and the samurai also exercised considerable arbitrary power over other classes, such as peasants or the chōnin (townspeople). For example, a samurai is permitted to summarily execute petty townspeople or peasants if they behaved rudely towards him, although such executions were rarely carried out. Because official treatment was often harsh, villages (mura) and the chōnin often resolved disputes internally, based on written or unwritten codes and customs.

=== Modern developments and Japanese law today ===
==== Legal reforms after the Meiji Restoration ====
Major reforms in Japanese law took place with the fall of the Tokugawa Shogunate and the Meiji Restoration in the late 1800s. At the beginning of the Meiji Era (1868–1912), the Japanese populace and politicians quickly accepted the need to import western legal system as part of the modernization effort, leading to a rather smooth transition in law. Under the influence of western ideas, the Emperor proclaimed in 1881 that a Nation Diet (parliament) would be established, and the first Japanese Constitution (Meiji Constitution) was ‘granted’ to the subjects by the Emperor in 1889. Japan's Meiji Constitution emulated the German constitution with broad imperial powers; British and French systems were considered but were abandoned because they were seen as too liberal and democratic. Elections took place for the lower house, with voters consisting of males paying a certain amount of tax, about 1% of the population.

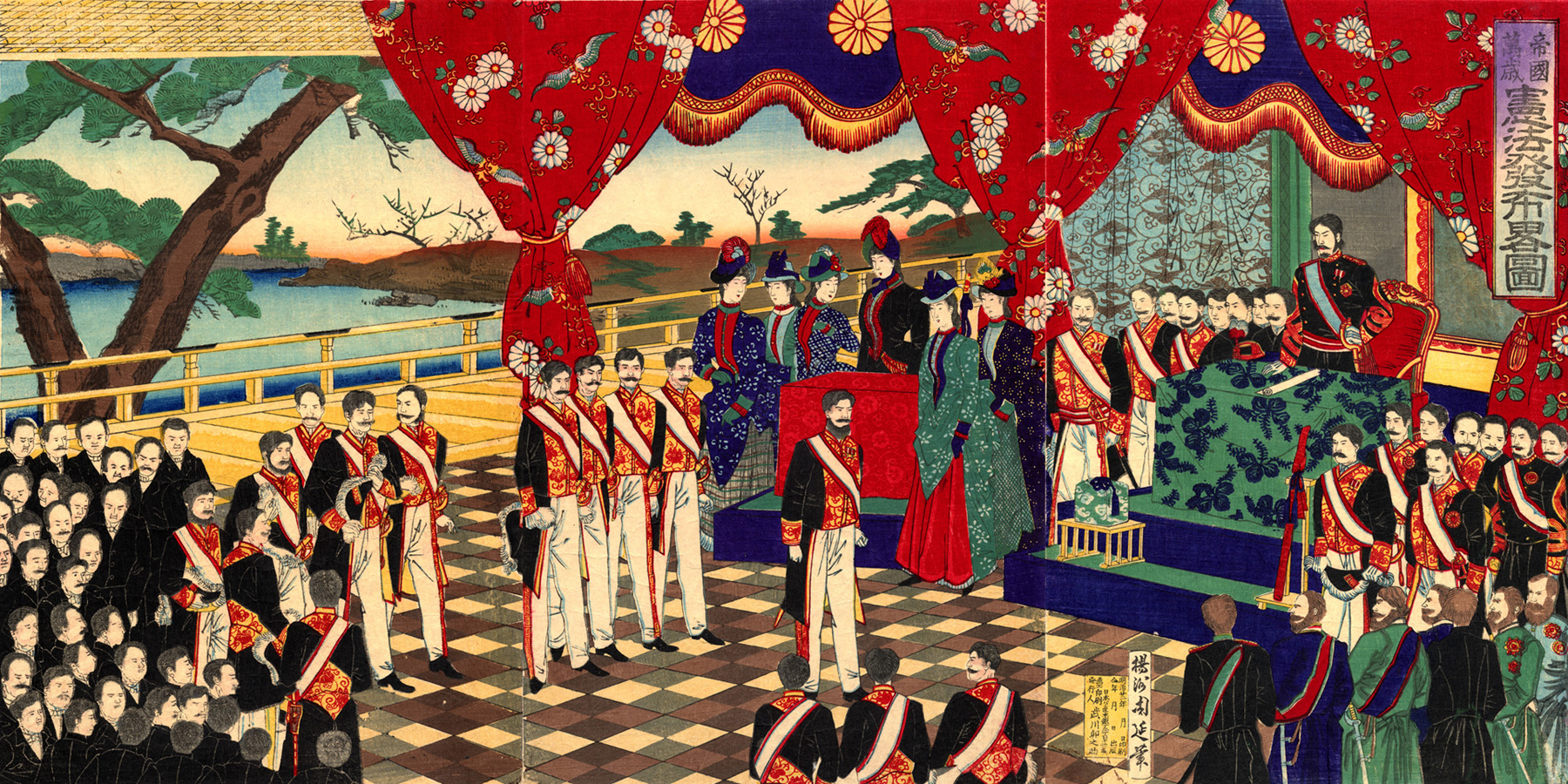
Meiji Constitution promulgation by Toyohara Chikanobu

With a new government and a new constitution, Japan began to systematically reform its legal system. Reformers had two goals in mind: first, to consolidate power under the new imperial government; second, to "modernize" the legal system and establish enough credibility to abolish unequal treaties signed with western governments.

The early modernization of Japanese law was primarily based on European civil law systems and, to a lesser extent, English and American common law elements. Chinese-style criminal codes (Ming and Qing codes) and past Japanese codes (Ritsuryo) were initially considered as models but abandoned. European legal systems – especially German and French civil law – were the primary models for the Japanese legal system, although they were often substantially modified before adoption. Court cases and subsequent revisions of the code also lessened the friction between the new laws and established social practice. The draft Bürgerliches Gesetzbuch (German civil code) served as the model for the Japanese Civil Code. For this reason, scholars have argued that the Japanese legal system is a descendant of the Romano-Germanic civil law legal system.

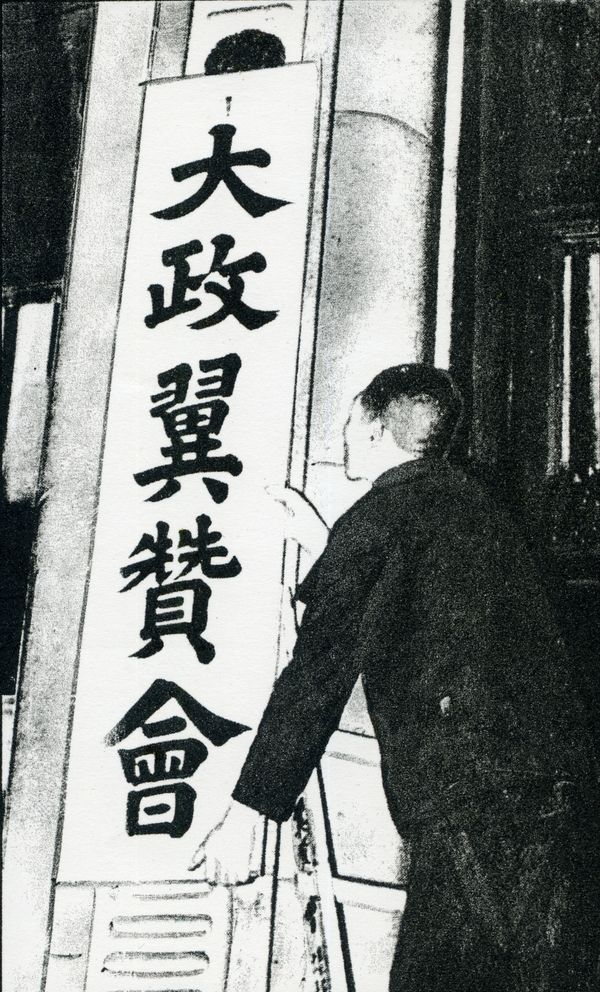
Establishment of the Imperial Rule Assistance Association in 1940

Laws on censorship and laws aimed to control political and labor movements were enacted in the Meiji era, curtailing the freedom of association. By the 1920s, laws were amended so that leaders of organizations that advocated for Marxism or changing the imperial structure could be put to death.

In the 1910s, a movement for more democracy developed and there were several cabinet supported by elected political parties. Before this, the genrō (leaders of the Meiji Restoration) would privately confer and recommend Prime Minister candidates and cabinet members to the Emperor. Reforms in this period include the General Election Law, which abolished property qualifications and allowed almost all men over age 25 to vote for members of the House of Representatives (the lower house), although the House of Peers was still controlled by the aristocracy. Voting rights was never extended to the colonies, like Korea, although colonial subjects who moved to Japan could vote after the 1925 reforms.

However, cabinets based on party politics were powerless against growing interference by the Japanese military. The army and navy had seats in the cabinet, and their refusal to serve in a cabinet would force its dissolution. A series of rebellions and coups weakened the Diet, leading to military rule by 1936.

During the Japanese invasion of China and the Pacific War, Japan was turned into a totalitarian state, which continued until Japan's defeat at 1945.

==== Japanese law post-World War II ====
After the Second World War, Allied military forces (overwhelmingly American) supervised and controlled the Japanese government. Japanese law underwent major reform under the guidance and direction of Occupation authorities. American law was the strongest influence, at times replacing and at times overlaid onto existing rules and structures. The Constitution, criminal procedure, and labor law, all crucial for the protection of human rights, and corporate law, were substantially revised. Major reforms on gender equality, education, democratization, economic reform and land reform were introduced.

The post war Japanese Constitution proclaimed that sovereignty rested with the people, deprived the Emperor of political powers, and strengthened the powers of the Diet, which is to be elected by universal suffrage. The Constitution also renounced war, introduced a Bill of Rights, and authorized judicial review. On gender equality, women were enfranchised for the first time in the 1946 election, and the Civil Code provisions on family law and succession were systematically revised. Laws also legalized labor unions, reformed the education system, and dissolved business conglomerates (Zaibatsu). Capital punishment was kept as a punishment for certain serious crimes. However, Japan retained its civil law legal system and did not adopt an American common law legal system.

Therefore, the Japanese legal system today is essentially a hybrid of civilian and common law structures, with strong underlying "flavors" from indigenous Japanese and Chinese characteristics. While historical aspects remain active in the present, Japanese law also represents a dynamic system that has undergone major reforms and changes in the past two decades as well.

== Sources of law ==
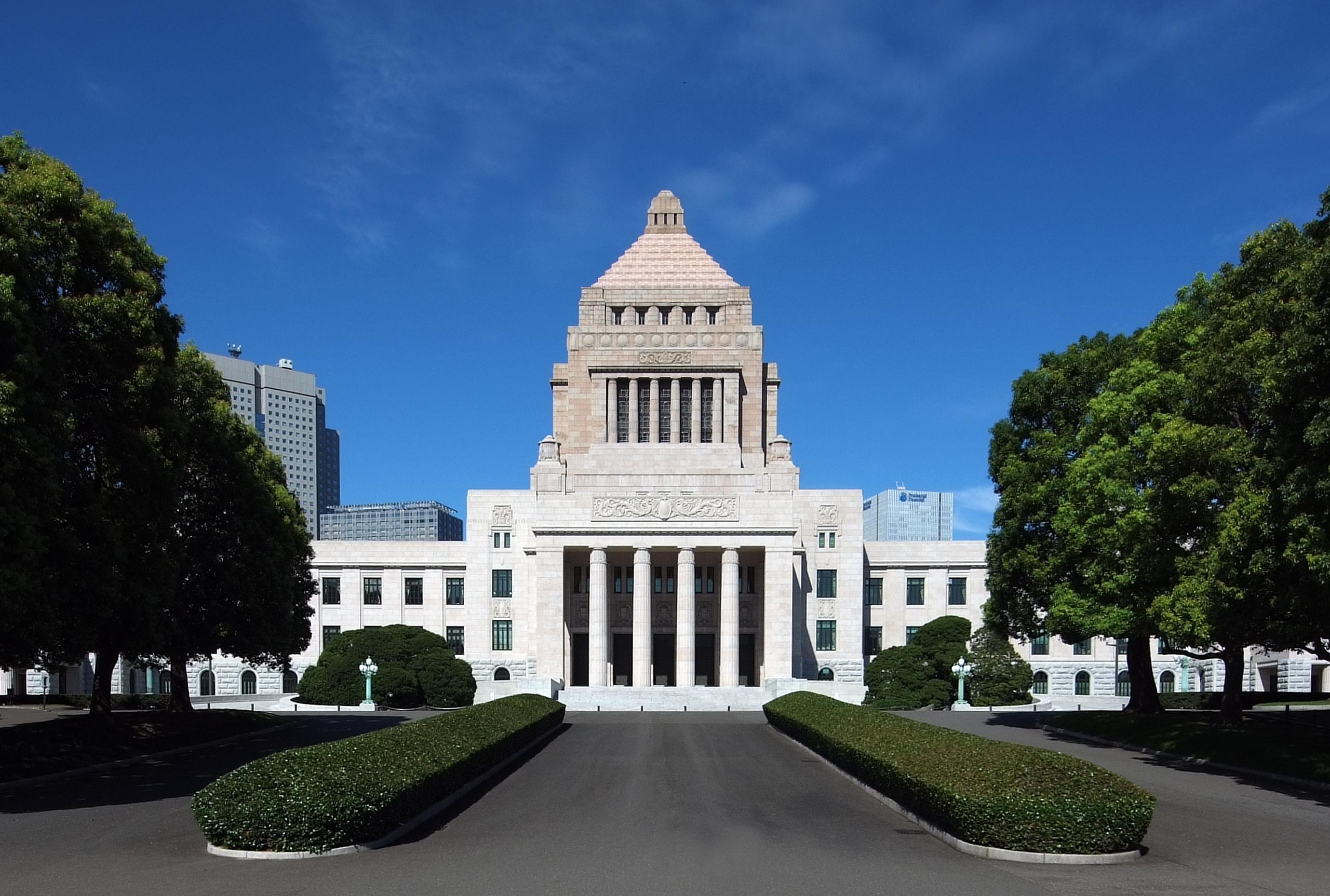
The National Diet is the national legislature, responsible for enacting new laws.

=== The Constitution ===
The present national authorities and legal system are constituted upon the adoption of the Constitution of Japan in 1947. The Constitution contains thirty-three articles relating to human rights and articles providing for the separation of powers vested into three independent bodies: the Legislature, Executive and Judiciary. Laws, ordinances and government acts that violate the Constitution do not have legal effect, and courts are authorized to judicially review acts for conformity with the constitution.

The National Diet is the bicameral supreme legislative body of Japan, consisting of the House of Councillors (upper house) and House of Representatives (lower house). Article 41 of the Constitution provides that "the Diet shall be the highest organ of State power, and shall be the sole law-making organ of the State." Statutory law originates from the National Diet, with the approval of the Emperor as a formality. Under the current constitution, unlike the Meiji Constitution, the Emperor does not have the power to veto or otherwise refuse to approve a law passed by the Diet, or exercise emergency powers.

=== The Six Codes in modern Japanese law ===
The modernization of Japanese law by transplanting law from Western countries began after the Meiji Restoration in 1868, in which the Japanese Emperor was officially restored to political power. Japanese law is primarily inspired by the Civilian system in continental Europe, which emphasizes codified statutes ("codes") that set out the basic legal framework in a particular area of law.

The first major legislation enacted in Japan was the Criminal Code of 1880, followed by the Constitution of the Empire of Japan in 1889, the Commercial Code, Criminal Procedure Act and Civil Procedure Act in 1890 and the Civil Code in 1896 and 1898. These were called the roppo (six codes) and the term began to be used to mean the whole of Japan's statute law. The roppo thus included administrative law of both central and local government and international law in the treaties and agreements of the new government under the emperor (in addition to former agreements with the United States and other countries, which had been entered into by the Tokugawa Shogunate).

The Six Codes are now:

1. The Civil Code (民法 Minpō, 1896)
2. The Commercial Code (商法 Shōhō, 1899)
3. The Criminal Code (刑法 Keihō, 1907)
4. The Constitution of Japan (日本国憲法 Nippon-koku-kenpō, 1946)
5. The Code of Criminal Procedure (刑事訴訟法 Keiji-soshō-hō, 1948)
6. The Code of Civil Procedure (民事訴訟法 Minji-soshō-hō, 1996)

The Civil Code, Commercial Code and the Criminal Code were enacted in the late nineteenth or early twentieth century. Parts of the Civil Code on family and inheritance were totally amended after World War II to achieve gender equality. Other codes were also periodically amended. For example, company law was separated from the Civil Code in 2005. The Japanese Civil Code has had a significant role in the development of civil law in several East Asian nations including South Korea and the Republic of China (Taiwan).

=== Other sources of law ===
==== Statutes ====
In addition to the six codes, there are individual statutes on more specific matters which are not codified. For example, in the area of administrative law, there is not a comprehensive administrative code. Instead, individual statutes such as the Cabinet Law, the Law on Administrative Litigation, the Law on Compensation by the State, City Planning Law, and other statutes all concern administrative law. Similarly, in the domain of labor and employment law, there are statutes such as the Labor Standards Law, the Trade Union Law, the Law on the Adjustment of Labor Relations, and the newly enacted Labor Contract Law. Other important statutes include the Banking Law, the Financial Instruments and Exchange Law, the Anti-Monopoly Law (competition law), the Patent Law, Copyright Law, and the Trademark Law.

In general, provisions of a specialized law take precedence over a more general law if there is a conflict. Thus, when provisions of the Civil Code and the Commercial Code both apply to a situation, the latter takes priority.

==== Delegated legislation ====
The Constitution is the supreme law in Japan; below it are statutes enacted by the Diet, then Cabinet orders (seirei), then ministerial ordinances. Article 11 of the Cabinet Law (Japanese: 内閣法), provides that Cabinet orders may not impose duties or restrict rights of citizens, unless such a power is delegated by statute. This rule reflects the traditional understanding of broad executive understanding developed under the 1889 Constitution. Under this principle, a Cabinet order can authorize government subsidies without statutory sanction, but cannot levy taxes. Other theories suggest that the 1947 Constitution requires a broader need for statutory authorization, on matters that do not restrict rights of citizens, such as on fiscal transfers to local governments, the pension system, or the unemployment system. The Law on the Organisation of State Administration provides authorizes ministerial ordinances to implement laws and cabinet orders, as long as it is specifically delegated by statute or cabinet order (Art. 12, para. 1).

Delegated legislation is implicitly recognized under Art. 73, para. 6 of the Constitution, which states that cabinet orders may not include criminal sanctions unless delegated by law. Delegations to the cabinet must not undermine the supremacy of the Diet in law-making and must be specific and concrete. The Supreme Court tend to allow broad delegations of power to the government.

==== Administrative rules, guidances and local regulations ====
Ministries and administrative agencies also issue circulars (tsutatsu), which are regarded as administrative rules rather than legislation. They are not a source of law but are instead internal guidelines; despite this, they can be very important in practice. Ministries also issue non-binding administrative guidances (written or oral), which has been criticized as opaque. The Law on Administrative Procedure prohibits retaliation in cases where persons do not follow government administrative guidances and some ministries attempted to codify them in cabinet orders and ministerial ordinances.

Local authorities may issue local regulations under Art. 94 of the Constitution and Law on Local Self-Administration, as long as they are not contrary to law. The law also authorizes local regulations to impose punishments including up to two years’ imprisonment or a fine of 1,000,000 yen.

==== Precedent ====
In the civil law system of Japan, courts follow the doctrine of jurisprudence constante under which judicial precedent provides non-binding guidance on how laws should be interpreted in practice. Judges seriously consider a series of similar precedents, especially any pertinent Supreme Court decisions, thus making understanding of precedent essential to practice. For example, the field of tort law originated from one intentionally general provision in the Civil Code (Art. 709) and was developed by a substantial body of case law. Similar developments are seen in the fields of administrative, labor, and landlord and tenant law.

Despite the importance of case law, stare decisis has no formal basis in Japanese law. Courts are in theory free to deviate from precedents and have from time to time done so, although they risk being reversed by a higher court. In addition, Japanese judges are generally career judges whose promotion and transfer can be greatly affected by the Supreme Court. Because of this, scholars have commented that Supreme Court decisions are de facto even more binding than in common law countries. Dicta by the Supreme Court is also often cited by lower courts.

Scholars and practising lawyers often comment on judicial judgments, which can then affect future judicial reasoning.

== Private law ==
Japanese civil law (concerning the relationship between private individuals, also known as private law) includes the Civil Code, the Commercial Code, and various supplemental laws. Civil law is the same throughout the country, and punishments and "provisions governing criminal offences" are found in the Penal Code of Japan.

The Civil Code of Japan (民法 Minpō) was created in 1896. It was heavily influenced by the 1887 draft of the German Civil Code, and to a lesser extent the French Civil Code. The code is divided into five books:

1. Book One is the General Part (総則), which includes basic rules and definitions of Japanese civil law, such as the capacity of natural and legal persons, juridical acts, and agency.
2. Book Two is entitled Real Rights (物権) and covers property and security rights over real property.
3. Book Three is the Law of Obligations (債権). Like in other civil law countries, tort law is considered one source from which an obligation emerges, together with unjust enrichment, and contract law.
4. Book Four deals with family relations (親族), including marriage and guardianship.
5. Book Five covers inheritance (相続), including wills and succession.

After World War II, sections dealing with family law and succession (books four and five) were fully revised during the occupation and brought closer to European civil law. This was because the parts on family and succession had retained certain vestiges of the old patriarchal family system that was the basis of Japanese feudalism. Other parts of the Civil Code remained substantially unchanged even after the occupation.

Numerous laws have been enacted to supplement the Civil Code as soon as it was adopted, including laws on the Registration of Real Property (1899) and the Law on Deposits (1899). The 1991 Law on Land and Building Leases merged three previous statutes on buildings, house leases and land leases. Special laws on torts such as Nuclear Damage (1961), Pollution (1971) and Traffic Accidents (1955) were also enacted to supplement the Civil Code. Other laws include the 1994 Product Liability Law and the 2000 Consumer Contract Law.

The Commercial Code (商法, Shōhō) is divided into the General Part, Commercial Transactions, and Merchant Shipping and Insurance. It was modeled on the German Commercial Code (Handelsgesetzbuch) of 1897 but with some French influence. The Commercial Code is considered a specialized law, meaning it take precedence over the Civil Code if both laws apply.

The Commercial Code also authorizes applying commercial custom over the Civil Code. Certain acts, such as buying properties with intention of reselling for profit as defined as commercial per se, while other acts are governed by the Commercial Code depending on whether the actors are businesses or merchants. The Code is supplemented by various other laws such as the Law on Cheques, the Law on Bills, and the Law on Commercial Registration. A Company Law was separated from the Commercial Code in 2005.

=== General provisions ===
Article 1 of the Civil Code, in the General Part (総則), emphasized public welfare, prohibited the abuse of rights, and required good faith and fair dealing. Similar provisions can be found in French and German law. These provisions are often invoked by Japanese courts to reach equitable results. For example, good faith and fair dealing was used to justify piercing the corporate veil, protecting tenants from evictions in certain cases, and developing the doctrine of unfair dismissal under employment law. The prohibition on abuse of rights was also invoked by courts in cases even where there is no contractual relationship.

The Civil Code's General Part also defines rights capacity (権利能力; German: Rechtsfähigkeit), which is the legal capacity to hold rights, assume duties, and incur liabilities through juridical acts (法律行為). Juridical acts are all declarations of will with specific legal consequences, including contracts, quasi-contracts, wills, gifts, torts, and incorporation. All living natural persons (and in some cases, unborn fetuses) have such private rights, which enable them to inherit property and claim damages in tort cases. Despite having full rights capacity, some persons' transactional capacity (行為能力; German: Handlungsfähigkeit) is limited. These include minors and certain adults under guardianship, whose acts may be rescinded if done without their legal guardian's consent. Legal persons also have legal capacity; they include foundations and associations (businesses and non-profits), with for-profit associations being companies subject to the Company Law. Acts by legal persons may be ultra vires if they exceed their scope of purposes.

=== Contracts ===
Japanese contract law is based mostly on the Civil Code, which defines the rights and obligations of the parties in general and in certain types of contracts, and the Commercial Code for certain commercial transactions. The Commercial Code is considered a specialized law, meaning it take precedence over the Civil Code if both laws apply. Contracts, along with wills, gifts and other acts with legal consequences, are considered juridical acts; and are governed by the Civil Code when the Commercial Code and commercial custom do not apply.

A contract requires the coinciding of the minds, with an offer and an acceptance. Parties must act in good faith when negotiating a contract and may need to disclose information before contracting in some situations. Consideration is not required and gifts are also considered contracts. Certain types of contract, such as suretyships or the purchase of farm land may require certain formalities, such as a written contract or administrative approval.

The Civil Code lists 13 nominate contracts, including: gift, sale, exchange, loan for consumption (mutuum), loan for use (commodatum), lease, employment, hire of services, mandate, deposit (consignment), partnership, life annuity, and settlement (transactio). The Commercial Code also includes typical commercial contracts, such as: sale, articles of incorporation, carriage of goods, warehousing, and insurance. Commercial contracts between Japanese companies are often brief, with parties preferring to leave certain possibilities open and negotiate for a mutually acceptable response instead of setting out detailed terms in writing. Courts sometimes prevent the termination or non-renewal of contracts when there is a strong reliance interest at stake, citing the duty to act in good faith.

Contracts are sometimes void because they go against public order or good morals (contra bonos mores), or because a party lacked good faith and fair dealing. Examples include gambling contracts, contracts that limited a person's right to withdraw from a union, and contracts that violate consumer protection laws. Contracts in areas such as leases, employment and consumer transactions are subject to additional regulation by law.

Contractual consent can sometimes be defective due to vitiating factors (German: Willensmangel), such as duress, fraud, mistake, or jests. In such cases, the law contains rules that balance the interests of the obligor, the obligee, and third parties, based partially on their states of mind and whether they acted in good faith. Some contracts are voidable, meaning that they are valid until a contracting party rescinds the contract.

=== Torts ===
Like the French Civil Code, the Japanese Civil Code only has a single provision on tort liability. Article 709 of the Civil Code states: "A person who intentionally or negligently violates the rights of others shall be liable for the loss caused by the act." Tort law was gradually developed largely based on case law, including cases on pollution. Statutes outside the Civil Code also regulate specific types of torts, such as the Law on the Compensation of Losses arising from Car Accidents enacted in 1955, the 1973 Law on the Remedies of Harm Caused to Human Health by Pollution, or the 1994 Law on Product Liability.

In a 1990 article, Takao Tanase posited that the calculated structuring of governmental and legal processes, not a cultural propensity toward harmonious social relations, accounted for the persistently low litigation rate in Japan. In Japan in 1986, fewer than 1% of automobile accidents involving death or an injury resulted in litigation, compared to 21.5% in the United States. The litigation rate was low, Tanase said, because Japan provides non-litigious methods of assessing fault, advising victims, determining compensation, and ensuring payment. Non-litigious dispute resolution mechanisms, mediation services, consultation centers operated by governments, the bar association, and insurance companies. The Japanese judiciary also works hard at developing clear, detailed rules that guarantee virtually automatic, predictable, moderate compensation for most accident victims. This contrasts with the American tort system, where the legal rules concerning both liability and general damages (i.e. non-economic loss) are stated in general terms, leaving a great deal to the judgment of constantly rotating lay juries—which in turn makes courtroom outcomes variable and difficult to predict.

The result was a system that is vastly more efficient and reliable in delivering compensation than the American tort system. Tanase estimated that legal fees comprised only 2% of the total compensation paid to injured persons. In the United States in the late 1980s, according to two big studies of motor vehicle accident tort claims (not just lawsuits), payments to lawyers equaled 47% of the total personal injury benefits paid by insurers. This expense drives up the cost of insurance to the point that huge numbers of drivers are uninsured or under-insured, which means that victims of their negligent driving will get little or nothing from the tort system.

=== Property ===
Property law is outlined in Book Two of the Civil Code. Real rights (物権) concern the rights of a person over a thing, a right in rem rather than in personam. Real rights in a thing are good against all the world (erga omnes), in contrast to personal rights which can only be claimed against specific parties. Property is classified into immovables (i.e. real property) and movables (i.e. personal property); different types of property are sometimes subject to different rules. For example, while registration of transfers of immovable property is not required, it is necessary for one to claim rights against a third party.

Like other civil codes, the Japanese Civil Code classifies types of property rights, including: ownership, surface rights (aka superficies), emphyteusis, servitudes (i.e. easements), and commonage (collective rights over land, such as forests). Real rights in security include: liens, preferential rights, pledge, and mortgage.

Japan has gradually strengthened the rights of the tenant, such that landlords are generally not allowed to unilaterally terminate leases without "just cause". Many landlords are forced to buy out their tenants if they wish to demolish buildings to make way for new development: one well-known contemporary instance is the Roppongi Hills complex, which offered several previous tenants special deals on apartments.

Despite this emphasis on tenant rights, the government exercises a formidable eminent domain power and can expropriate land for any public purpose as long as reasonable compensation is afforded. This power was famously used in the wake of World War II to dismantle the estates of the defunct peerage system and sell their land to farmers at very cheap rates (one historical reason for agriculture's support of LDP governments). Narita International Airport is another well-known example of eminent domain power in Japan.

=== Civil Procedure ===
The Code of Civil Procedure (民事訴訟法 Minji-soshō-hō) is the basic law on civil procedure. The reformed Code came into effect in 1998. After an initial complaint to the court, the Court schedules the first session of the oral proceeding. The court clerk serves a summons on the defendant to notify him of the date of the first session, along with a copy of the complaint and documentary evidence. The defendant's lawyer must then file an answer to the complaint. At the first session of the oral proceeding after the filing of the complaint and answer, the judge decides whether the case should proceed under the Preparatory Proceeding. A Preparatory Proceeding is closed to the public and held chiefly to identify the key issues of the dispute. In a complex dispute, there are usually multiple Preparatory Proceedings. The Oral Proceedings are held in open court, either by a single judge or three judges. After the close proceedings, the court renders a judgment on the merits of the case.

=== Corporate law ===
Japanese Company Law (会社法 kaisha-hō) was separated from the Commercial Code in 2005. Shareholder liability rules generally follow American example. Under Japanese law the basic types of companies are:

- Limited liability partnerships (yūgen sekinin jigyō kumiai)
- Kabushiki kaisha (K.K.), similar to an American joint-stock company
- Gōdō kaisha (G.K.), similar to an American limited liability company
- Gōmei kaisha, similar to an American general partnership
- Gōshi kaisha, similar to an American limited partnership
- Yūgen kaisha, a now abolished form based on the German GmbH (limited liability company)

Japanese commercial law is also characterized by a relationship with the bureaucracy that is important in determining how those engaged in commerce conduct business.

=== Employment law ===
Basics of the Japanese employment law are established in the Japanese Constitution, which was framed in large part with an eye toward the U.S. Constitution. As such, employment laws in Japan are similar to those in the U.S., and can be divided into three general categories: labor standards, labor relations, and trade unions. The 'employment' or 'service' contract is recognised under article 623 of the Japanese Civil Code. While the term "labour contract" is not defined under the Labor Standards Act (LSA), to all intents and purposes the courts regard the two as one and the same, and the terms "labour contract" and "employment contract" as interchangeable. It is through the civil procedure, therefore, that the boundaries of the individual contract have largely been defined by means of a comprehensive body of case law.

Most terms and conditions of employment are provided by the company's work rules, which may be drawn up and varied unilaterally. However, under the LSA, an employer of more than ten persons is required to draw up a set of rules specifying certain conditions of work, including hours, rates of pay, promotion, retirement and dismissal (LSA s. 89). About 42 per cent of the private sector workforce is employed in firms with fewer than ten employees. Consequently, these employers are exempt from the legal obligation to provide formal work rules in respect of their employees. The LSA also requires the employer to consult with the union, if any, or with a person who represents a majority of the employees in drafting the work rules (LSA s. 89). A copy of the work rules must also be submitted to the Labour Standards Office (LSA s. 90).

Under the Japanese Constitution, citizens are guaranteed the right to maintain the minimum standards of a wholesome and cultured life (s. 25). These are to be maintained through the right to work (s. 27) and the right to property (s. 29). The Constitution also guarantees certain work-related rights. Wages, hours and other working conditions must be fixed by law (s. 27).

Under the Industrial Safety and Health Act of 1972 (ISHA), employers bear the major responsibility for the prevention of occupational disease and accident through an integrated scheme of insurance and safety and health management. Furthermore, through the employment contract, employers owe a general duty to take care of their employees’ health and safety—and may be sued for damages for negligence in cases where breach of duty or violation of the statutory regulations has occurred.

== Criminal law ==
Japanese criminal sentencing, 1994
Crime	Sentence	Prevalence
Murder (514)	7–10 years in prison	103 (20%)
Murder (514)	3 years at hard labor	96 (19%)
Murder (514)	3–5 years in prison	94 (18%)
Murder (514)	5–7 years in prison	88 (17%)
Murder (514)	Other sentences	133 (26%)
Assault (10,920)	¥100–200,000 fine	4130 (38%)
Assault (10,920)	¥200–300,000 fine	2084 (19%)
Assault (10,920)	¥300–500,000 fine	1161 (11%)
Assault (10,920)	1–2 years at hard labor	857 (8%)
Assault (10,920)	6–12 months at hard labor	571 (5%)
Assault (10,920)	6–12 months in prison	541 (5%)
Assault (10,920)	1–2 years in prison	512 (5%)
Assault (10,920)	Other sentences	1064 (9%)
Drug offenses (10,766)	1–2 years at hard labor	3,894 (36%)
Drug offenses (10,766)	1–2 years in prison	3,490 (32%)
Drug offenses (10,766)	2–3 years in prison	1,791 (17%)
Drug offenses (10,766)	Other sentences	1591 (15%)

=== History ===
Before the Meiji period (1867–1912), the powers of the Tokugawa shogunate, or the judges they appointed, possessed a large amount of discretion, which often resulted in the abuse of power. Capital punishment was the main measure of dealing with offenders in the criminal justice system. Under feudalism, authorities frequently used the death penalty against political rivals.

After the Meiji Restoration, as Western culture was introduced, the government established new laws reflecting a gradually modernizing Japanese society. The first criminal code after the Restoration was the Shinritsu Koryo (新律綱領) of 1869, primarily influenced by the Chinese Ming and Qing codes and the law of the Tokugawa Shogunate. However, new criminal law and prison laws were passed in an effort to bring Japan into line with Western countries. An 1880 criminal code was primarily inspired on French law, while the current code, enacted in 1907 was primarily based on German law.

Based on the new Constitution after World War II, the Criminal Code was radically changed to reflect constitutional rights such as free expression and gender equality. The Criminal Code has since been amended from time to time, and special laws were also enacted to target specific areas of crime.

The Criminal Procedure Code was also drastically amended after World War II, under American legal influence, to guarantee due process and largely adopting an adversarial system. Under this system, the roles of the police, the prosecutor, and the judge changed. The rights of offenders also became a main issue in the criminal justice system in the post-war period. Unfortunately, immediately following this innovation, a series of cases resulted in a miscarriage of justice partly because the police were not accustomed to the new system.

Although a jury system came into force in 1939, it was practically never used because of inflexibility in the ongoing criminal justice system at that time. In addition, professional judges have always enjoyed a high level of trust in Japanese society. After the war, the police began to carry guns instead of sabers, according to the advice of the United States.

Arguments were frequently made for reforming the main laws such as the Criminal Law (1907), the Juvenile Law (1947) and the Prisons Law (1907). However, plans for reform were controversial because they addressed delicate issues, such as the introduction of protective measures to Criminal Law, juvenile punishment, or the abolition of the practice of imprisoning defendants in police cells. Japanese society is relatively conservative in its approach to reforms and is generally inclined to oppose them. The government attempts to reform older laws by issuing a series of supplements. However, both the Code of Criminal Law and the Juvenile Law were revised in 1948 after the manifested new constitution of 1946, following the interruption to reform that World War II presented.

In 1926, a governmental advisory commission drafted forty principles to be included in the revision of the penal code that a few years later were used as the basis of a provisional "Revised Penal Code of Japan", published in 1941. While this document itself does not remain as the present form of the penal code of Japan it was largely influential to its construction and has informed the judicial interpretation of the modern code.

=== Criminal law ===
Japanese criminal law is primarily based on the Criminal Code (刑法) of 1907. Other important statutes include the Law on Misdemeanours, the Law on the Prevention of Subversive Activities, the Law on Penalising Hijacking, the Law on the Prohibition of Unlawful Access to Computers, and the Law on the Control of Stalking. The General Part of the Criminal Code expounds principles and concepts, including intention, negligence, attempt, and accomplice, which applies to all criminal laws.

==== Classification of crimes ====
- Legal classification. The three main categories of crime under the Japanese Criminal Law are crimes against the state, crimes against society and crimes against individuals. This law was passed under the old Constitution which had mainly focused on the power of the emperor and the state. As a result, crimes against the imperial family and the state were highly emphasized. While crimes against the imperial family were abolished after World War II, the fundamental structure of this law was little changed. Since there has been no complete revision of the law, the law remains fairly antiquated on the surface.

The criminal justice system reflects the state's task of protecting individual interests in daily life. Crimes against life, person, and freedom include homicide, assault, bodily injury, forcible rape, indecent assault, and kidnapping. Crimes against property include theft, fraud, robbery, extortion, and embezzlement. The concept of theft has a very broad meaning and includes burglary, shoplifting, and stealing the goods in a car. Stealing bicycles from in front of railway stations is a typical theft according to criminal statistics. Crimes which significantly cause social disorder, like arson, indecent behavior in the public, and gambling, are usually placed in a category of crimes against society. Bribery is considered a crime against the state.

- Special laws. Includes firearms and sword control law, laws for regulating business that affects public morals, anti-prostitution laws, anti-organized crime laws, and road traffic laws. There are a large number of traffic offenses, indicating serious problems on roads in Japan. Annually, there are 11,000 deaths caused by traffic accidents. After a controversy involving citizens' freedom of association in 1992, an anti-organized crime law was passed which regulated the activity of Boryokudan crime organizations.
- Age of criminal liability. Persons younger than 20 years of age are legally considered juveniles. According to the Juvenile Law, juvenile cases go to Family court. The court subsequently determines the need to subject the juvenile concerned to protective measures and the most beneficial treatment for the juvenile. Possible measures include placement under the supervision of probation officers, commitment to a child education or training home or a house for dependent children, and commitment to a juvenile training school. The Juvenile Law states that juvenile cases should be in principle separated from adult cases in terms of their future development. Although there are exceptions, juveniles are criminally prosecuted when the case involves a certain punishment in response to a very serious offense.
- Drug offenses. There are special laws regulating cannabis, narcotics and psychotropics, stimulants and opium. Drug regulations cover punishment for the use, trade, possession, and production of drugs. In the 1990s a new drug regulation was introduced to conform to the standards of the United Nations. Toluene, thinner, and bonding substances are regulated by special law as well. Their abuse is a serious problem among the youth, partly because of their cheap price. Drug abuse in Japanese society largely stems from the use of amphetamine, which is largely imported from other Asian countries. Organized crime is involved in the handling and production of amphetamines and has become rich from this activity.

==== Crime statistics ====
Police, prosecution, court, correction and after-care divisions each publish their own statistics as a yearbook. The Ministry of Justice summarizes their statistics and publishes a book, White Paper on Crime. Because of the nationwide unitary system of these agencies, such a complete portrayal of the crime situation in Japan is possible.

Japan is widely regarded to have exceptionally low levels of crime. In 2017, for example, its intentional homicide rate was 0.2 per 100,000 people, compared to 5.3 per 100,000 in the United States and 1.2 in the United Kingdom. In 2018, crime fell to a new low since World War II, declining for the 16th consecutive year.

=== Criminal procedure ===
The Code of Criminal Procedure (刑事訴訟法) governs Japanese criminal procedure. Investigation is conducted by police officers and public prosecutors. No one can be apprehended, searched or seized except on the basis of a warrant issued by a competent judicial officer. Warrants for arrests are not needed for in flagrante delicto (現行犯) and serious offenses for which a warrant cannot be obtained in time.

Suspects can be detained for a maximum of seventy-two hours before being brought before a judge to authorize continued detention. Suspects must be informed of their right to remain silent, and counsel will be appointed if they cannot afford one. Suspects can be detained for 10 days prior to indictment, renewable once (Art. 208). After indictment, there is no limit to the length of detention and some defendants spend months awaiting trial. Bail is available only after indictment, although its use is limited.

Prosecutors have broad discretion on whether to prosecute, but a Prosecution Review Board (検察審査会) consisting of randomly selected citizens and the court, through a procedure known as fushinpan seido (付審判制度), may review cases and initiate prosecution.

Criminal trials are necessary in Japan regardless of whether the defendant pleads guilty. In a criminal trial where the defendant has admitted guilt, the average time needed to complete the trial is 2.6 months; but contested cases take an average of 8.5 months to complete. Japanese criminal trials are adversarial, with parties taking initiative in producing and examining evidence; parties are in theory allowed to cross-examine witnesses, although trials often rely on documentary testimony rather than live testimony. Judges deliver the verdict and determine sentencing. Both the prosecution and the defense may appeal to a higher court.

== Law enforcement ==
The national level police organizations are the National Public Safety Commission and the National Police Agency (NPA). Since the commission makes basic policy while the NPA administers police affairs, the commission has control over the NPA. The commission is a governmental body responsible mainly for the administrative supervision of the police and coordination of police administration. It also oversees matters relating to police education, communication, criminal identification, criminal statistics and police equipment. To ensure its independence and neutrality, not even the Prime Minister is empowered to direct and give orders to the NPSC.

The NPA, which is headed by a Director General, maintains Regional Police Bureaus as its local agencies throughout the country. There are seven bureaus in the major cities, excluding Tokyo and the northern island of Hokkaido. Police law stipulates that each prefectural government, which is a local entity, shall have its own Prefectural Police (PP). The PP is supervised by the Prefectural Public Safety Commission, which carries out all police duties within the boundaries of the prefecture. In practice, the PP forces are located in each of the 47 prefectures. The National Police Academy, the National Research Institute of Police Science and the Imperial Guard Headquarters are also organizations affiliated with the NPA. In addition, the Koban system provides local residents with safety and peace through daily contacts of police officers with residents in the area. Originally created by the Japanese police, this system has been recently adopted by countries such as Germany and Singapore. However, its success depends on the human relationship between the police officers and the community people. At times, there is an excess of intervention by police. The Koban system rests on approximately 15,000 police boxes (Hasshusho) and residential police boxes (Chuzaisho) located throughout the country.

=== Resources ===
- Expenditures. There are two types of police budgets: the national budget and the prefectural budget. The national police budget covers the expenditures of the NPA relevant to the execution of duties under its jurisdiction, including personnel costs, expenses incurred by the prefectural police which are shouldered by the state, and subsidies to the PP. Expenditures needed by the PP to carry out their duties are appropriated in the budget of each prefecture. In 1992, the NPA budget totalled 213,464 billion yen and the PP budget totalled 2,992,454 million yen (US$270 billion).

The total National Police Agency Budget for the 1990 fiscal year was 198,420 billion yen, of which 41.5% (82,282 billion yen) went toward personnel expenses, 14.5% (28,870 billion yen) went toward equipment, communications, and facilities, 18.2% (36,149 billion yen) were allocated toward other expenses, and 25.8% (51,119 billion yen) went toward subsidies for Prefectural Police. In all, 74.2% of the total (147,301 billion yen) went toward NPA expenses.

- Number of police. The NPA and the PP personnel forces are composed of police officers, officers of the Imperial Guard Headquarters, and civilian employees such as clerical workers and technical engineers. In 1990, there were about 258,800 authorized full-time police personnel. The ratio of police to population is about one officer to 556 citizens. The NPA is composed of approximately 7,600 personnel, of whom 1,200 are police officers, 900 are Imperial Guards and 5,500 are civilian personnel. The 47 PP forces have a total strength of approximately 250,000, of whom 220,000 are police officers and 30,000 are civilians. There are approximately 4,200 female police officers (1.6%), whose role has been growing in importance. In addition, there are about 14,000 female civilians, of whom about 3,100 are traffic control personnel and juvenile guidance personnel engaged in on-the-street juvenile control.

=== Technology ===
- Availability of police automobiles. Motor vehicles are assigned to all police boxes throughout the country. Because of their mobility, they are useful in handling emergency cases, investigating criminal activity, and enforcing traffic control. As of 1994, there are approximately 26,000 police motor vehicles, including 5,000 patrol cars, 3,000 traffic police motorcycles, 5,000 vehicles employed for criminal investigation and 2,500 transport vehicles. In addition, about 200 police boats and 60 helicopters are assigned to each jurisdiction.
- Electronic equipment. Network technology includes police telephone circuits, facsimile, an integrated system for police activities, a communication command system and mobile radio system, portable radio sets, a communication satellite, and multi-channel mobile telephone cars.
- Weapons. After World War II, the United States advised Japanese police to require individual police officers to carry guns, whereas they used to carry only sabers. However, few guns are actually used. One problem is that offenders may initially attack police in order to obtain guns.

=== Training and qualifications ===
Recruited police officers must immediately attend a three-part training course, consisting of preservice, on-the-job, and a comprehensive training course. Those recruited by the PP are enrolled in a 1-year preservice training course at their respective police academies.

=== Discretion ===
- Confessions. Admissions of testimony in court may not include confessions made under compulsion, torture or threat, or after prolonged detention or confinement. Conviction or punishment cannot be permitted where the only proof against the defendant is his or her own confession.

== Legal professions ==
Japan recognizes a large number of legal professions. Due to the fact that Japanese law is based on the continental European civil law system, Japan has a small number of lawyers (advocates) who are complemented by large numbers of civil law notaries and scriveners. Japan introduced a new legal training system in 2004 as part of a justice system reform. The justice system reform has been criticized for failing to incorporate a gender perspective. The major professions, each of which has a separate qualification process, include:

- Attorney at law (弁護士, bengoshi)
- Registered Attorney at foreign law (外国法事務弁護士, gaikokuhō jimu bengoshi; or "gaiben")
- Notary (公証人, kōshōnin)
- Administrative scrivener (行政書士, gyōsei shoshi)
- Judicial scrivener (司法書士, shihō shoshi)
- Certified public accountant (公認会計士, kōnin kaikeishi)
- Certified tax accountant (税理士, zeirishi)
- Patent attorney (弁理士, benrishi)
- Certified social insurance and labor consultant (社会保険労務士, shakai hoken rōmushi)
- Land and House Investigator (土地家屋調査士, tochi kaoku chōsashi)

In-house legal advisors at major corporations are almost entirely unregulated, although there has been a trend in the past decade towards attorneys moving in-house.

== Courts and procedure ==
Japan's court system is divided into four basic tiers, 438 Summary Courts, one District Court in each prefecture, eight High Courts and the Supreme Court. There is also one Family Court tied to each District Court.

=== Rights of the accused ===
- Rights of the accused. The Constitution is the source of individual rights in the setting of criminal investigations and trial. Article 31 declares, "No person shall be deprived of life or liberty, nor shall any other penalty be imposed, except according to procedure established by law", which is regarded as the principle of due process. Article 33 covers protection from illegal arrest: "no person shall be arrested except upon a warrant issued by a competent judicial official, which specifies the offense with which a person is charged". Article 34 protects persons from illegal confinement and Article 35 protects persons from illegal deprivation of residence and property.

Provisions directly governing trial proceedings provide that admissions of testimony must be compelling. There are also rights guaranteeing a speedy and public trial, full opportunity to examine all witnesses, and legal counsel by lawyers employed by the state if the accused cannot afford a private lawyer. In addition, a person cannot incur criminal liability if the act was lawful at the time it was committed, and cannot be subject to conviction for the same crime twice (double jeopardy).

- Assistance to the accused. The state must provide legal counsel if the defendant cannot afford a private lawyer.

=== Procedures ===
- Preparatory procedures for bringing a suspect to trial. Procedure in criminal prosecutions is uniform throughout Japan, and based primarily on the 1948 Code of Criminal Procedure and the 1949 Rules of Criminal Procedure under the Constitutional Law, reflecting Anglo-American legal concepts in contexts important to the protection of human rights. When police investigation is completed, police must refer the matter, including the evidentiary data, immediately to a public prosecutor. If the matter involves confining a suspect, they must refer the case to the public prosecutor within 48 hours of the suspect's arrest after which a determination is made concerning pre-trial detention.

The jury system has, for all practical purposes, been suspended. There are no procedures equivalent to a guilty plea. That is, even if the defendant acknowledges guilt, the prosecutor must submit evidence to establish guilt. Further, since the Japanese procedural system does not include pre-sentence investigations and reports by probation officers, evidentiary data bearing on the sentencing must be presented by the parties to the case, to be supplemented by the court's own inquiries. In this context, the court is the exclusive trier of fact, which consists of the physical evidence and, when that is the case, the confession of the accused as well as any witnesses testimony.

- Official who conducts prosecution. Only prosecutors are empowered to institute the prosecution of a criminal case and to direct the enforcement of criminal sentences. They have a large amount of discretion in controlling and directing criminal cases. (Japanese Criminal Procedure Code, Art.248). Accordingly, they have the power to suspend prosecution even when they can prove the offender committed a crime. They can also investigate all categories of criminal cases on their own initiative, without assistance from the police and other law enforcement agencies. Special cases, such as bribery involving highly placed government officials or corporate crimes involving a breach of trust by executives are often investigated by prosecutors. The increasing frequency of the occurrence of these special cases have emphasized the importance of the prosecutor's investigative powers.

Under the Supreme Public Prosecution Office are 8 higher offices, 50 district offices and 810 local offices. As of 1990, there were about 1,100 prosecutors and 900 assistant public officers, who are all appointed by the central government.

- Proportion of prosecuted cases going to trial. Japan has a low rate of acquittals and a high rate of convictions. In 1988, there were 57,790 accused persons tried in first-instance courts, of which only 50 (0.01%) were found not guilty. Defense lawyers generally prefer the introduction of mitigating circumstantial evidence rather than arguing with the prosecutor. In addition, both practicing lawyers and judges regard criminal cases as being less attractive than other types of cases.
- Pre-trial incarceration conditions. If the public prosecutor believes that continued detention of the accused is needed, he or she must apply to a judge for a warrant of detention. This warrant must be applied for within 24 hours after police transfer to the prosecutor, or a maximum of 72 hours from the time of arrest.

If reasonable grounds to detain a suspect exist, the judge must promptly issue a warrant or order of detention at a maximum of 10 days before prosecution is instituted. Reasonable grounds are determined by three criteria: 1) whether the suspect has a fixed dwelling, 2) whether the suspect might destroy evidence and; 3) whether he might flee the jurisdiction.

== Case law ==
- International family law
  - Sweden v. Yamaguchi (Lagerfeld v. Yamaguchi)
  - English summaries of important family law related cases
- Teruki Tsunemoto, "Trends in Japanese Constitutional Law Cases: Important Judicial Decisions for 2004", trans. Daryl Takeno, Asian-Pacific Law & Policy Journal
- Teruki Tsunemoto, "Trends in Japanese Constitutional Law Cases: Important Legal Precedents for 2005", trans. John Donovan, Yuko Funaki, and Jennifer Shimada, Asian-Pacific Law & Policy Journal
- Teruki Tsunemoto, "Trends in Japanese Constitutional Law Cases: Important Legal Precedents for 2006", trans. Asami Miyazawa and Angela Thompson, Asian-Pacific Law & Policy Journal
- Teruki Tsunemoto, "Trends in Japanese Constitutional Law Cases: Important Legal Precedents for 2007", trans. Mark A. Levin and Jesse Smith, Asian-Pacific Law & Policy Journal

== See also ==
- Constitution of Japan
- Government of Japan
- Human rights in Japan
- Judicial system of Japan
- Juries in Japan
- Legal systems of the world
- Politics of Japan
- Women in law in Japan

=== Specific laws ===
- Japanese Civil Code
- Local Autonomy Law
