= Kabushiki gaisha =

Company with limited liability established under Japanese law

A kabushiki gaisha (Japanese: 株式会社; pronounced [kabɯɕi̥ki ɡaꜜiɕa]; lit. 'share company') or kabushiki kaisha, commonly abbreviated K.K. or KK, is a type of company (会社, kaisha) defined under the Companies Act of Japan. The term is often translated as "stock company", "joint-stock company" or "stock corporation". The term kabushiki gaisha in Japan applies to any joint-stock company regardless of country of origin or incorporation; however, outside Japan the term is used specifically for joint-stock companies incorporated in Japan.

== Usage in language ==
In Latin script, kabushiki kaisha, with a ⟨k⟩, is often used, but the original Japanese pronunciation is kabushiki gaisha, with a ⟨g⟩, owing to rendaku.

A kabushiki gaisha must include "株式会社" in its name (Article 6, paragraph 2 of the Companies Act). In a company name, "株式会社" can be used as a prefix (e.g. 株式会社電通, kabushiki gaisha Dentsū, a style called 前株, mae-kabu) or as a suffix (e.g. トヨタ自動車株式会社, Toyota Jidōsha kabushiki gaisha, a style called 後株, ato-kabu).

Many Japanese companies translate the phrase "株式会社" in their name as "Company, Limited"—this is very often abbreviated as "Co., Ltd."—but others use the more Americanized translations "Corporation" or "Incorporated". Texts in England often refer to kabushiki kaisha as "joint stock companies". While that is close to a literal translation of the term, the two are not precisely the same. The Japanese government once endorsed "business corporation" as an official translation but now uses the more literal translation "stock company."

Japanese often abbreviate "株式会社" in a company name on signage (including the sides of their vehicles) to 株 in parentheses, as, for example, "ABC㈱." The full, formal name would then be "ABC株式会社". 株式会社 is also combined into one Unicode character at code point U+337F ㍿ SQUARE CORPORATION, while the parenthesized form can also be represented with a single character, U+3231 ㈱ PARENTHESIZED IDEOGRAPH STOCK as well as parentheses around U+682A 株 CJK UNIFIED IDEOGRAPH-682A and its romanization U+33CD ㏍ SQUARE KK. These forms, however, only exist for backward compatibility with older Japanese character encodings and Unicode and should be avoided when possible in new text.

== History ==
The first kabushiki gaisha was the Dai-Ichi Bank, incorporated in 1873.

Rules regarding kabushiki gaisha were set out in the Commercial Code of Japan, and was originally based on laws regulating German Aktiengesellschaft (which also means share company). However, during the United States-led Allied Occupation of Japan following World War II, the occupation authorities introduced revisions to the Commercial Code based on the Illinois Business Corporation Act of 1933, giving kabushiki gaisha many traits of American corporations, and to be more exact, Illinois corporations.

Over time, Japanese and U.S. corporate law diverged, and K.K. assumed many characteristics not found in U.S. corporations. For instance, a K.K. could not repurchase its own stock (a restriction lifted by the amendment of the Commercial Code in 2001), issue stock for a price of less than ¥50,000 per share (effective 1982–2003), or operate with paid-in capital of less than ¥10 million (effective 1991–2005).

On June 29, 2005, the Diet of Japan passed a new Companies Act (会社法, kaisha-hō), which took effect on May 1, 2006.

== Formation ==
A kabushiki gaisha may be started with capital as low as ¥1, making the total cost of a K.K. incorporation approximately ¥240,000 (about US$2,500) in taxes and notarization fees. Under the old Commercial Code, a K.K. required starting capital of ¥10 million (about US$105,000); a lower capital requirement was later instituted, but corporations with under ¥3 million in assets were barred from issuing dividends, and companies were required to increase their capital to ¥10 million within five years of formation.

The main steps in incorporation are the following:

1. Preparation and notarization of articles of incorporation
2. Receipt of capital, either directly or through an offering

The incorporation of a K.K. is carried out by one or more incorporators (発起人, hokkinin; sometimes referred to as "promoters"). Although seven incorporators were required as recently as the 1980s, a K.K. now only needs one incorporator, which may be an individual or a corporation. If there are multiple incorporators, they must sign a partnership agreement before incorporating the company.

1. The value or minimum amount of assets received in exchange for the initial issuance of shares
2. The name and address of the incorporator(s)

The purpose statement requires some specialized knowledge, as Japan follows an ultra vires doctrine and does not allow a K.K. to act beyond its purposes. Judicial or administrative scriveners are often hired to draft the purposes of a new company.

Additionally, the articles of incorporation must contain the following if applicable:

1. Any non-cash assets contributed as capital to the company, the name of the contributor and the number of shares issued for such assets
2. Any assets promised to be purchased after the incorporation of the company and the name of the provider
3. Any compensation to be paid to the incorporator(s)
4. Non-routine incorporation expenses that will be borne by the company

Other matters may also be included, such as limits on the number of directors and auditors. The Corporation Code allows a K.K. to be formed as a "stock company that is not a public company" (公開会社でない株式会社, kōkai gaisha denai kabushiki gaisha), or a (so-called) "close company" (非公開会社, hi-kōkai gaisha), in which case the company (e.g. its board of directors or a shareholders' meeting, as defined in the articles of incorporation) must approve any transfer of shares between shareholders; this designation must be made in the articles of incorporation.

The articles must be sealed by the incorporator(s) and notarized by a civil law notary, then filed with the Legal Affairs Bureau in the jurisdiction where the company will have its head office.

=== Receipt of capital ===
In a direct incorporation, each incorporator receives a specified amount of stock as designated in the articles of incorporation. Each incorporator must then promptly pay its share of the starting capital of the company, and if no directors have been designated in the articles of incorporation, meet to determine the initial directors and other officers.

The other method is an "incorporation by offering," in which each incorporator becomes the stock underwriter of a specified number of shares (at least one each), and the other shares are offered to other investors. As in a direct incorporation, the incorporators must then hold an organizational meeting to appoint the initial directors and other officers. Any person wishing to receive shares must submit an application to the incorporator, and then make payment for his or her shares by a date specified by the incorporator(s).

Capital must be received in a commercial bank account designated by the incorporator(s), and the bank must provide certification that payment has been made. Once the capital has been received and certified, the incorporation may be registered at the Legal Affairs Bureau.

== Structure ==
=== Board of directors ===
Under present law, a K.K. must have a board of directors (取締役会, torishimariyaku kai) consisting of at least three individuals. Directors have a statutory term of office of two years, and auditors have a term of four years.

Small companies can exist with only one or two directors, with no statutory term of office, and without a board of directors (取締役会非設置会社, torishimariyaku-kai hi-setchi-gaisha). In such companies, decisions are made via shareholder meeting and the decision-making power of the directors is relatively limited. As soon as a third director is designated such companies must form a board.

At least one director is designated as a Representative Director (代表取締役, daihyō-torishimariyaku), holds the corporate seal and is empowered to represent the company in transactions. The Representative Director must "report" to the board of directors every three months; the exact meaning of this statutory provision is unclear, but some legal scholars interpret it to mean that the board must meet every three months. In 2015, the requirement that at least one director and one Representative Director must be a resident of Japan was changed. It is not required to have a resident Representative Director although it can be convenient to do so.

Directors are mandatories (agents) of the shareholders, and the Representative Director is a mandatory of the board. Any action outside of these mandates is considered a breach of mandatory duty.

=== Auditing and reporting ===
Every K.K. with multiple directors must have at least one statutory auditor (監査役, kansayaku). Statutory auditors report to the shareholders, and are empowered to demand financial and operational reports from the directors.

K.K.s with capital of over ¥500m, liabilities of over ¥2bn and/or publicly traded securities are required to have three statutory auditors, and must also have an annual audit performed by an outside CPA. Public K.K.s must also file securities law reports with the Ministry of Finance.

Under the new Company Law, public and other non-close K.K.s may either have a statutory auditor, or a nominating committee (指名委員会, shimei-iin-kai), auditing committee (監査委員会, kansa-iin-kai) and compensation committee (報酬委員会, hōshū-iin kai) structure similar to that of American public corporations. If the company has an auditing committee, it is referred to as a company with a board of statutory auditors (監査役会設置会社, kansayaku-kai setchi-gaisha).

Close K.K.s may also have a single person serving as director and statutory auditor, regardless of capital or liabilities.

A statutory auditor may be any person who is not an employee or director of the company. In practice, the position is often filled by a very senior employee close to retirement, or by an outside attorney or accountant.

=== Officers ===
Japanese law does not designate any corporate officer positions. Most Japanese-owned kabushiki gaisha do not have "officers" per se, but are directly managed by the directors, one of whom generally has the title of president (社長, sha-chō). The Japanese equivalent of a corporate vice president is a department chief (部長, bu-chō). Traditionally, under the lifetime employment system, directors and department chiefs begin their careers as line employees of the company and work their way up the management hierarchy over time. This is not the case in most foreign-owned companies in Japan, and some native companies have also abandoned this system in recent years in favor of encouraging more lateral movement in management.

Corporate officers often have the legal title of shihainin, which makes them authorized representatives of the corporation at a particular place of business, in addition to a common-use title.

== Other legal issues ==
=== Taxation ===
Kabushiki gaisha are subject to double taxation of profits and dividends, as are corporations in most countries. In contrast to many other countries, however, Japan also levies double taxes on close corporations (yugen gaisha and gōdō gaisha). This makes taxation a minor issue when deciding how to structure a business in Japan. As all publicly traded companies follow the K.K. structure, smaller businesses often choose to incorporate as a K.K. simply to appear more prestigious.

In addition to income taxes, K.K.s must also pay registration taxes to the national government and may be subject to local taxes.

=== Derivative litigation ===
Generally, the power to bring actions against the directors on the corporation's behalf is granted to the statutory auditor.

Historically, derivative suits by shareholders were rare in Japan. Shareholders have been permitted to sue on the corporation's behalf since the postwar Americanization of the Commercial Code; however, this power was severely limited by the nature of court costs in Japan. Because the cost to file a civil action is proportional to the amount of damages being claimed, shareholders rarely had the motivation to sue on the company's behalf.

In 1993, the Commercial Code was amended to reduce the filing fee for all shareholder derivative suits to ¥8,200 per claim. This led to a rise in the number of derivative suits heard by Japanese courts, from 31 pending cases in 1992 to 286 in 1999, and to a number of very high-profile shareholder actions, such as those against Daiwa Bank and Nomura Securities.

== See also ==
- Gōdō gaisha
- Gōmei gaisha
- Gōshi gaisha
- Yūgen gaisha
