= Perpetual succession =

Perpetual succession in company law

In company law, perpetual succession is the continuation of a corporation's or other organization's existence despite the death, bankruptcy, insanity, change in membership or an exit from the care of any owner or member, or any transfer of company shares, etc.

Perpetual succession, along with the common seal, is one of the factors explaining a corporation's legal existence as separate from those of its owners. This principle states that:

- any change in membership of a company does not affect the status of the company,
- death, insolvency, insanity etc. of any member of a company does not affect the continuity of the company. Thus the life of the company does not depend upon the life of its members.
- it shall continue forever irrespective of continuity of its members or directors, except in case of liquidation (or "winding up") of a company.

It as well regards to the fact that a juridical entity separate from its owners may continue existing for an indefinite time period. This contrasts to legal entities that are not separate from their owners in that these entities are not normally continued after the life of their owners, although transfers can technically be made to new ownership.
