= Yūgen gaisha =

Former type of business entity in Japan

A yūgen gaisha (有限会社; "limited company"), abbreviated in English as "Y.K." or "Co., Ltd.", was a form of business organization in Japan.

Yūgen gaisha were based on the German Gesellschaft mit beschränkter Haftung and were implemented in Japan in the Limited Company Act (有限会社法, Yūgen gaisha hō) of 1940. The Companies Act of Japan, implemented on May 1, 2006, replaced the yūgen gaisha with a new form of company called gōdō gaisha, based upon the American limited liability company. Following the implementation, no new YKs are to be allowed for foundation, but pre-existing YKs were allowed to continue their operations as kabushiki gaisha under special rules.

Whether the term is pronounced as yūgen gaisha or yūgen kaisha is up to the local dialect or the company's preference when it is part of the company's name. While it is pronounced yūgen gaisha in standard Japanese, the alphabetic abbreviation is always Y.K. by standard.

== Structure ==
As of 2005, a Y.K. can have up to 50 investors, called members (社員, shain). The members were required to provide at least ¥3 million in capital contributions, with individual interest shares (持分, mochibun) valued at no less than ¥50,000. The minimum capital amount was much more permissive than the ¥10 million minimum for a kabushiki gaisha. A Y.K. was also not required to issue certificates for investment units, whereas stock certificates were required for a K.K.

Unlike a K.K., a Y.K. does not need to have a board of directors or statutory auditors: the minimum requirement is one director (取締役, torishimariyaku).

Because of its simplified structure and relatively lax incorporation requirements, the Y.K. form is associated with small businesses. However, some larger companies have used the form: ExxonMobil's principal Japanese subsidiary, for instance, is a Y.K. with paid-in capital of ¥50 billion (US$420 million). In addition to simplified corporate governance, a Y.K. receives some tax benefits under foreign laws such as the U.S. Internal Revenue Code.
