= Gōmei gaisha =

In Japanese law (cf. Companies Act of Japan), gō-mei gaisha (合名会社), means that all partners are jointly and severally liable for any liability incurred by the partnership, similar to an unlimited partnership in other countries. The partners' liability is unlimited, and creditors can go after each partner's personal assets if the assets of the partnership are insufficient to meet the obligations. The law divides legal relations of the Go-mei Gaisha into two categories: internal relations specified in Section 2 of the Go-mei Gaisha Law and external relations specified in Section 3 of the Go-mei Gaisha Law. Internal relations refers to relations between the partnership and the partners as well as relations among partners. The Commercial Code specifies that both the articles of incorporation and the Commercial Code govern these internal relations, but it has been commonly interpreted that the articles of incorporation override the Commercial Code when determining these rights. External relationship refers to relations between the partnership and third parties, as well as between a partner and third parties. External relations are governed by law to protect third parties by providing a fair, stable, and foreseeable legal relations.
