= Telstra Corporation Ltd v Desktop Marketing Systems Pty Ltd =

2001–2002 legal case about copyright

Telstra v Desktop Marketing Systems
- Court: Full Court of the Federal Court
- Full case name: Desktop Marketing Systems Pty Ltd v Telstra Corporation Ltd
- Decided: 15 May 2002
- Citations: [2002] FCAFC 112; (2002) 119 FCR 491

Case history
- Prior actions: Telstra Corporation Ltd v Desktop Marketing Systems Pty Ltd [2001] FCA 612 (25 May 2001); Telstra Corporation Ltd v Desktop Marketing Systems Pty Ltd (No 2) [2001] FCA 814 (29 June 2001)
- Subsequent actions: Telstra Corporation Ltd v Phone Directories Company Pty Ltd [2010] FCA 44 (8 February 2010); Telstra Corporation Ltd v Phone Directories Company Pty Ltd [2010] FCAFC 149 (15 December 2010)

Court membership
- Judges sitting: Black CJ, Lindgren & Sackville JJ

Telstra Corporation Ltd v Desktop Marketing Systems Pty Ltd was a 2001–2002 case in the Federal Court of Australia in which Telstra successfully argued that its copyright had been infringed by the reproduction of data from the White and Yellow Pages telephone directories in CD-ROM format.

It was an important decision in copyright law of Australia until the High Court of Australia criticised it in IceTV Pty Ltd v Nine Network Australia Pty Ltd (2009). In 2010, the Federal Court ruled that copyright no longer subsisted in the White or Yellow Pages, effectively overturning the decision.

== Trial ==
In a decision handed down on 25 May 2001, Finkelstein J reviewed the history of copyright dating back to medieval England. Despite the need to establish authorship and originality, his Honour noted that "an examination of the English cases over the last few hundred years or so shows that in only a few has copyright been denied to a compilation."

Although there were "policy reasons both for and against" adopting the United States Supreme Court decision in Feist Publications, Inc., v. Rural Telephone Service Co. (1991), Finkelstein J considered that he was bound by English authority and could not "jettison the old law and replace it with the principles expressed in Feist."

Therefore, copyright subsisted in both the telephone directories and the headings books. Although the information had been reproduced in a different visual format, the differences were not "material" and the substance of the information taken from Telstra's works had been reproduced.

=== Consequences ===
Although privacy issues did not play a part in Finkelstein J's reasoning, the decision had the indirect effect of preventing the publication of reverse telephone directories in Australia. The "Blackpages" service hosted by a group of Australian computer security enthusiasts was taken down shortly after Finkelstein J's decision.

== Appeal ==
Finkelstein J granted Desktop Marketing Systems leave to appeal to the Full Court.

Lindgren J regarded Walter v Lane (1900) as "the high point of the line of authority supportive of the proposition that one can be the 'author' of a work without scope for variance in expression" (i.e. creativity). His Honour held that "decisively for the present case, there is no principle that the labour and expense of collecting, verifying, recording and assembling (albeit routinely) data to be compiled are irrelevant to, or are incapable of themselves establishing, origination, and therefore originality." Any departure from the long course of Anglo-Australian authority would have to be done by the High Court.

Sackville J noted that the trial and the appeal were conducted on the basis that it was unnecessary for Telstra to establish that the directories or headings books had a particular or joint authors. Synthesising the historical cases, he concluded that "a compilation of factual information will ordinarily be an original literary work for copyright purposes if the compiler has undertaken substantial labour or incurred substantial expense in collecting the information." The decision in Feist reflected considerations peculiar to the United States.

Black CJ agreed with the reasons of both Sackville and Lindgren JJ. The appeal was dismissed.

== Post-IceTV consideration ==
On 22 April 2009, the High Court of Australia handed down its decision in IceTV Pty Ltd v Nine Network Australia Pty Ltd. Gummow, Hayne and Heydon JJ criticised Desktop Marketing and concluded that copyright did not subsist in a similar compilation produced by the Nine Network. Noting the failure of the parties in Desktop Marketing to identify the compilation's authors, their Honours found that "it may be that the reasoning in Desktop Marketing with respect to compilations is out of line with the understanding of copyright law over many years."

On 8 February 2010, Gordon J (then sitting as a Federal Court judge at first instance) determined that Telstra does not hold copyright in the White Pages or the Yellow Pages. While Telstra had argued that the decision in Desktop Marketing continued to apply, Gordon J noted the High Court's warning and that Finkelstein J too had questioned the parties' underlying assumptions about authorship. Gordon J found that Telstra had "manifestly" failed to identify the joint authors of the White and Yellow Pages, and "none of the people said to be authors of the Works exercised 'independent intellectual effort' or 'sufficient effort of a literary nature' in creating the Works."

Telstra's appeal to the Full Court (Keane CJ, Perram and Yates JJ) was dismissed on 15 December 2010. The decision was described by a commentator as "at odds with reality" and a spokesman for then-Attorney-General Robert McClelland said the government was considering the implications of the decision.

== See also ==
- Copyright in compilation
- Database right
- United States copyright law
- Sweat of the brow
