= Itar-Tass Russian News Agency v. Russian Kurier, Inc. =

United States copyright case

- Court: United States Court of Appeals for the Second Circuit
- Full case name: Itar-Tass Russian News Agency, et al v. Russian Kurier, Inc., et al
- Argued: December 17, 1997
- Decided: August 27, 1998
- Citations: 153 F.3d 82; 1998 Copr. L. Dec. (CCH) ¶ 27,813; 47 U.S.P.Q.2d 1810; 26 Media L. Rep. 2217

Case history
- Prior history: 886 F. Supp. 1120 (S.D.N.Y. 1995)

Court membership
- Judges sitting: Wilfred Feinberg, Jon O. Newman, Joseph M. McLaughlin

Case opinions
- Majority: Newman, joined by Feinberg, McLaughlin

Itar-Tass Russian News Agency v. Russian Kurier, Inc., 153 F.3d 82 (2d Cir. 1998), was a copyright case about the Russian language weekly Russian Kurier in New York City that had copied and published various materials from Russian newspapers and news agency reports of Itar-TASS. The case was ultimately decided by the United States Court of Appeals for the Second Circuit. The decision was widely commented upon and the case is considered a landmark case because the court defined rules applicable in the U.S. on the extent to which the copyright laws of the country of origin or those of the U.S. apply in international disputes over copyright. The court held that to determine whether a claimant actually held the copyright on a work, the laws of the country of origin usually applied (more precisely: "copyright is a form of property" and under the Second Restatement's approach, the governing law is "determined by the law of the state with 'the most significant relationship' to the property and to the parties"), but that to decide whether a copyright infringement had occurred and for possible remedies, the laws of the country where the infringement was claimed applied (lex loci delicti).

== Case history ==
Itar-TASS, several Russian newspapers, and the Union of Journalists of Russia sued Russian Kurier, its owner, and its printing company for copyright infringement in 1995 in the United States District Court for the Southern District of New York. The court issued a preliminary injunction against the defendant. This preliminary injunction applied to all copied articles for which the plaintiffs had registered copyright with the U.S. Copyright Office or that were published after March 13, 1995, the date Russia signed the Berne Convention. The U.S. at that time still required explicit copyright registrations for copyrights to be recognized as valid. Of the more than 500 articles Russian Kurier had copied from 1992 to 1995, the court considered 317 copyrighted in the U.S. as "Berne Works" (i.e., works originally published in another member country of the Berne Convention, of which the U.S. had been a member since 1989), and a further 28 first published in Russia before March 13, 1995, were copyrighted in the U.S. because they were indeed registered at the U.S. Copyright Office, accounting for a total of 345 copyright violations.

In its ruling two years later (No. 95 Civ. 2144(JGK) (S.D.N.Y. March 10, 1997); also known as "Itar-TASS II"), the court found Russian Kurier and its owner had willfully committed multiple copyright violations. The court upheld the injunction and fined the defendants US$ 500,000 in favor of the plaintiffs. The printing company was fined US$3,934 as by printing the newspaper, the court considered it had contributed to the commitment of these copyright violations, although without intent. The court defined that the plaintiffs' rights were to be determined by Russian law, but the infringement had to be judged by U.S. law; and came to the conclusion that under Russian copyright law, the news agency Itar-TASS and the individual authors of the newspaper articles certainly were copyright holders and thus entitled to sue. However, the district court denied the journalists' association any right to relief as it was unclear exactly which of its members were authors of the copied articles, or whether all such authors were indeed members. There was some dispute over the copyright claims by the newspapers, as the defendants' experts argued that these only held a copyright on their publication "as a whole" but not on individual articles, but the district judge agreed with the plaintiffs' expert who interpreted the relevant paragraphs of the Russian law as giving rise to "parallel exclusive rights in both the newspaper publisher and the reporter", similar to co-authorship.

The defendants appealed against that court's ruling. The case came before the United States Court of Appeals for the Second Circuit (153 F.3d 82 (2d Cir. 1998)), which partly confirmed and partly reversed the district court's ruling and remanded the case for further proceedings.

The court of appeals affirmed the choice of applicable law made by the lower court. It agreed that Russian law was to be used to determine who was the copyright holder of the work and that U.S. law was to be applied to figure out whether a copyright violation had occurred and to judge it. However, it overturned the decision of the district court regarding the newspapers. The court of appeals, after extensive analysis, found the view of the defendants' experts on the matter "more compelling". It stated that newspapers had no copyright on individual articles in their publications but only a compilation copyright on the publication as a whole. The copyright on the text of the individual articles was found to vest in the individual authors of these articles unless there had been a contractual assignment of copyrights from the reporters to their employers (the newspapers). Since the newspapers did not provide any evidence of such copyright assignments, the appellate court ruled in this case that they did not hold the copyright on the text of the individual copied articles. Finally, the court explicitly decided

- that Itar-TASS, as a news agency (not a newspaper), was a copyright holder and was entitled to injunctive relief and damages,
- that the Union of Journalists of Russia might be entitled to relief as it was considered acting on behalf of its members, amongst them the individual authors of the copied articles, and
- that the newspapers, albeit not entitled to relief due to copying of the article text as they did not hold the copyright, might still be entitled to relief due to the wholesale cut-and-paste copying done by Russian Kurier, which might have infringed the newspapers' rights arising from the creative efforts in the selection, arrangement, or display of the articles.

Because of the two last points, the case was remanded to the district court. The appellate court "in view of the reckless conduct of the defendants in the flagrant copying that infringed the rights of Itar-Tass, the rights of the authors, and very likely some aspects of the limited protectable rights of the newspapers" left the injunction in force until the district court would, on remand, issue a new ruling.

== Consequences ==
The ruling concerning the choice of law (lex originis for determining copyright ownership and lex loci delicti for the infringement) was contrary to the previous presumption that only the law where the infringement occurred (i.e., lex loci delicti) would apply. It has been discussed controversially in several publications. Since the Berne Convention does not offer any guidance on which law shall be applied to determine copyright ownership, this ruling is still the relevant case law in this question and the principle is applied in the U.S. even in other recent cases. The decision is only effective within the U.S.; other countries may follow other rules, such as using the lex loci delicti exclusively.

The copyright in the U.S. on foreign publications that had failed to comply with the (former) formality requirements of the U.S. was generally restored when the copyright restorations of the Uruguay Round Agreement Act (URAA) became effective in the U.S. on January 1, 1996. The URAA was a result of the TRIPS agreement, part of the Uruguay Round of the General Agreement on Tariffs and Trade (GATT) negotiations. The URAA automatically restored the copyright on foreign works that were still copyrighted in their country of origin on January 1, 1996, (Note: Or at the date of adherence of the country of origin to an international copyright treaty the U.S. was also party to, if the country of origin was not yet member of any such treaty on January 1, 1996.) but whose copyright in the U.S. had lapsed through non-compliance with the U.S. formalities, such as non-registration or a lack of international or bilateral copyright treaties between the country of origin of a work and the U.S. Later copyright cases in the U.S. do apply the URAA restorations and thus even may consider unregistered foreign works as copyrighted in the U.S.

== Related cases ==
The lex loci delicti is not always the US law, even for cases heard in the US. In London Film Productions, Ltd. v. Intercontinental Communications, Inc. (1984) a US corporation was sued by a British company for infringements under the laws of several Latin American countries; the US court determined that it had jurisdiction.

In Bridgeman Art Library, Ltd. v. Corel Corp. (1998) a US court decided that it must apply the stricter US threshold of originality (decided in Feist v. Rural) rather than the lower British standard invoked by the plaintiff.

A more complex case of determining ownership under Russian law in a US court was Films by Jove Inc. v. Berov because it involved two claimants to copyrights under the Russian laws to films by Soyuzmultfilm, themselves involved in litigation in Russia. A US judge basically overruled a decision by the High Court of Arbitration of Russia because, in his view, the Russian court's decision was "strongly influenced, if not coerced, by the efforts of various Russian government officials seeking to promote 'state interests'", thus lacking procedural fairness.

In France, the Court of Cassation decided on 10 April 2013 that in case of conflicting laws, the French law prevails in all matters regarding copyright, including the determination of ownership. This ruling quashed the decision of a lower court, which had decided that in a lawsuit between a reporter-cameraman of a US media company operating in France, the US law applied in determining ownership of the footage.
