= TVTV =

TVTV may refer to:

- tvtv Services, an electronic programme guide service provider
- TVTV (TV series), 1993 Australian TV series
- TVTV (video collective), active in San Francisco 1972–1979
- TV TV Australia Pty Ltd, corporate owner of IceTV
- MTV Sub, launched as TVTV!, a Finnish TV channel

== See also ==
- Television
- .tv (TV channel)
