= Threshold of originality =

Minimal requirement for copyright

According to the US Copyright Office, the Best Western logo does not contain a sufficient amount of original and creative authorship to be protected by copyright.

In copyright law, the threshold of originality is used to assess whether a particular work can be copyrighted. It is used to distinguish works that are sufficiently original to warrant copyright protection from those that are not. In this context, "originality" refers to "coming from someone as the originator/author" (insofar as it somehow reflects the author's personality), rather than "never having occurred or existed before" (which would amount to the protection of something new, as in patent protection).

Copyright finds its international commonality in the Berne Convention that creates the foundation of several concepts of international copyright law; however, the threshold for attracting copyright is not defined. This threshold is up to each jurisdiction to determine. While works that do not meet these thresholds are not eligible for copyright protection, they may still be eligible for protection through other intellectual property laws, such as trademarks or design patents (particularly in the case of logos).

== Originality in specific types of works ==
=== Pre-positioned recording devices ===
Security cameras, webcams, camera traps and other pre-positioned recording devices capture whatever happens to take place in their field of view. This raises the question as to whether their recordings are an original and therefore copyrighted work.

This question remains untested in the United States. In the 2008 United States district court case Southwest Casino and Hotel Corp. vs Flyingman, the casino filed suit for copyright infringement on the use of their surveillance video, but the defendant argued in a motion that the surveillance video lacked the sufficient creativity needed to secure copyright protection. However, the case was never heard as a separate tribal court ruled that the tribes, rather than the casino, owned the footage. The United States Copyright Office has allowed copyright registration of dashcam footage.

In the United Kingdom the topic came up in 2000, during the aftermath of the death of Diana, Princess of Wales and Dodi Fayed, when a security guard at a property owned by Dodi's father, Mohamed Al Fayed, took still-frame photographs from security video – which showed the couple in the driveway just before their deaths – and sold them to a newspaper. Al Fayed and his privately held security company filed suit, alleging, among other things, infringement of copyright. In that case, Hyde Park Residence Ltd v. Yelland before the Court of Appeal of England and Wales, "ownership and subsistence of copyright were not in dispute", because, "as section 1 of the 1988 Act makes clear, copyright is a property right" which was owned by the security company. Ultimately, that case concluded that copying and selling the photographs did not lead to a defence of fair dealing, nor did it serve the public interest.

In New Zealand, the Copyright Act 1994 requires films to be original to qualify for copyright protection. However, according to law professor Susy Frankel, case law supports a low threshold of originality, so arguments could be made that such recordings can be copyrighted because placing and operating a video camera involves "skill, judgement, and labour". She states that it's also possible that security camera films would not meet the threshold, and that "each case must be assessed on its facts".

In Canada, "skill and judgement" are required for a photograph to be protected by copyright, and a photograph meets this threshold "even by the particular angle and point of view" according to the Canadian Internet Policy and Public Interest Clinic. However, legal scholar David Vaver has expressed the view that "whether scenes taken by an automatic surveillance camera are authored by anyone is doubtful: the person responsible for positioning the camera is no Atom Egoyan. Such authorless films may have no copyright at all".

In the law of continental European countries, works are required to be original to have copyright protection. According to a 2002 book by professor and lawyer Pascal Kamina, written before the European Court of Justice harmonised the threshold of originality between European Union member countries in 2009, "it is unlikely, however, that security camera videos would be considered original".

Russian copyright law specifically exempts purely informational reports on events and facts from protection, and security camera footage is not considered a work of authorship. This interpretation was applied in a number of Russian legal cases.

=== Works by non-human authors ===
A similar topic came up in 2011, when the Caters News Agency asked the website Techdirt to take down a photo that Caters had licensed from nature photographer David Slater. The image—a self-portrait taken by a wild monkey using Slater's camera—had been used to illustrate a post questioning whether Slater could even hold any copyright interest in the image. Slater argued that he had copyright interest in the photo because he had "engineered" the shot, and that "it was artistry and idea to leave them to play with the camera and it was all in my eyesight. I knew the monkeys were very likely to do this and I predicted it. I knew there was a chance of a photo being taken." Aurelia J. Schultz disputed Slater's claims, noting a monkey would be incapable of holding a copyright in Indonesia (where the photo was taken), the United Kingdom, or the United States, because it is not a legal "person". In December 2014, the United States Copyright Office issued an opinion that works by animals cannot be copyrighted because they were not a work of authorship by a human, but the copyright office did not rule on whether Slater or the monkey would be considered the author of those specific images.

== Uses of the concept of originality by country ==
=== Australia ===
The Australian Aboriginal flag was copyrighted in Australia until the copyright of the flag was transferred to the Commonwealth on 25 January 2022.

Despite consisting only of two fields and a circle at the centre, the Federal Court of Australia had upheld copyright claims over the Australian Aboriginal flag by its designer, Harold Thomas. On 24 January 2022, the Commonwealth government announced, after more than three years of confidential negotiations, Thomas had transferred the copyright to the flag to the Commonwealth. The federal government paid AUS$20.05 million to Thomas and licence holders (including WAM Clothing and Carroll and Richardson Flagworld) to extinguish existing licences and secure copyright. As part of the copyright transfer, Thomas retained moral rights over the flag (which include the right to be identified as its creator). Following the copyright transfer, Carroll and Richardson Flagworld continued to be the exclusive manufacturer, although individuals may make copies for personal use.

=== Canada ===
Under Canadian copyright law, an eligible work must be original to its author, not copied from another work, and requires more than trivial or mechanical intellectual effort. In the case of CCH Canadian Ltd v Law Society of Upper Canada, the Supreme Court of Canada examined the different approaches taken to the definition of originality. The Supreme Court ultimately concluded that the proper approach in Canadian law fell between the approach of labour and diligence, and that of creativity. Chief Justice McLachlin stated that the "exercise of skill and judgment" was necessary in order for an expression to attract copyright protection. Chief Justice McLachlin went on to state that the exercise of skill and judgement would require "intellectual effort" and "must not be so trivial that it could be characterized as a purely mechanical exercise." It has been suggested that this approach taken by the Supreme Court of Canada is functionally the same as the approach taken by the Supreme Court of the United States in Feist Publications, Inc., v. Rural Telephone Service Co., and by some civil law courts as those courts require that a work demonstrate a "modicum of creativity" in decision making rather than a mechanical exercise in order to be original.

=== European Union ===
The test for the threshold of originality is in the European Union whether the work is the author's own intellectual creation. This threshold for originality was harmonised within the European Union in 2009 by the European Court of Justice in Infopaq International A/S v Danske Dagblades Forening case.

==== Germany ====
German case law considered the logo of ARD to be ineligible for protection under German copyright law.

In German copyright law, the "Schöpfungshöhe" (literally: height of creation) could classify copyrightable works into two classes, a design, or anything else (such as a literary work). While the threshold (which is reached even by simple creations, known as "Kleine Münze", German for "Small coin") was low, the requirements for design, works that have a "purpose" (such as brand identification), was set much higher, as "novel" designs could be protected by the lex specialis law for design patents ("Geschmacksmustergesetz") or by trademark laws. Only design creations that were very high above the average were considered to be "works of applied art" and so granted copyright. As an example in case law, the logo of the German public broadcaster ARD was considered ineligible for protection under German copyright law.

In November 2013, the Federal Court of Justice rejected the concept of a lower standard for applied artworks in the Geburtstagszug case. The court ruled that per changes made to German law in 2004 by the implementation of the Directive on the legal protection of designs, copyright and design right were two separate concepts that could co-exist in applied art, as they had different requirements; novelty and an "individual character" for design right, and "a degree of creativity which allows, from the view of a public open to art and sufficiently skilled in ideas of art, to be called an 'artistic' performance", for copyright. This makes the threshold nearly identical to that in other forms of works. The case centred around the creator of the "Birthday Train", who had received royalties from a design patent but wanted to also collect royalties on the concept as a copyrighted work.

In June 2016, a state court ruled in a complaint against the Wikimedia Foundation by the Reiss Engelhorn Museum that digital reproductions of public domain works are subject to a new copyright.

==== Netherlands ====
A controversial decision on 16 July 2013 rendered "backseat conversations"—such as those between Willem Endstra and police—not sufficiently creative for copyright protection.

=== India ===
Section 13(1)(a) of the Copyright Act, 1957 (which is largely derived from the British Copyright Act 1956) states that copyright subsists in "original literary, dramatic, musical and artistic works".

Courts initially favoured a doctrine of originality being based upon the "skill, labour and brain" used in the preparation of the work. This was demonstrated in the cases of V. Govindan v E.M. Gopalakrishna Kone and Burlington Home Shipping Pvt Ltd v Rajnish Chibber, which held that compilations (an English-Tamil dictionary) and databases (an internal customer database that had been obtained by a former employee and brought to their competitor) were eligible for copyright.

However, the Supreme Court would reject this doctrine in the 2007 case Eastern Book Company & Ors vs D.B. Modak & Anr; Eastern Book Company had published copy-edited versions of Supreme Court judgments with numbered paragraphs, cross-references, and headnotes that were written by the Company itself. The respondents had published CD-ROMs containing compilations of these judgments, which Eastern Book Company alleged were sourced from its publications; the CD-ROMs contained the copy-edited texts of the judgments themselves, but did not contain the headnotes and original content that were written by Eastern Book Company.

Citing American and Canadian case law, the Court established that judgments or court orders by published by judicial authorities were considered to be in the public domain per Section 52(1)(q) of the Copyright Act, and that a work would meet the originality standard as long as there is labour or effort involved, but not only labour. The court held that mere copy-editing "lacks originality as it does not depict independent creation even a modicum of creativity. The inputs put by the appellants is nothing but expressing an idea which can be expressed in a limited way and as such there cannot be a copyright. Filling the blanks or gaps by providing names of the parties or citations of the judgments, both of which are well known and unchangeable parts of that idea, are not original work." The court held that the headnotes that did not copy from the judgment verbatim were copyrightable, and that the division of a judgment into paragraphs and numbering them was enough to meet a standard of skill.

=== Japan ===
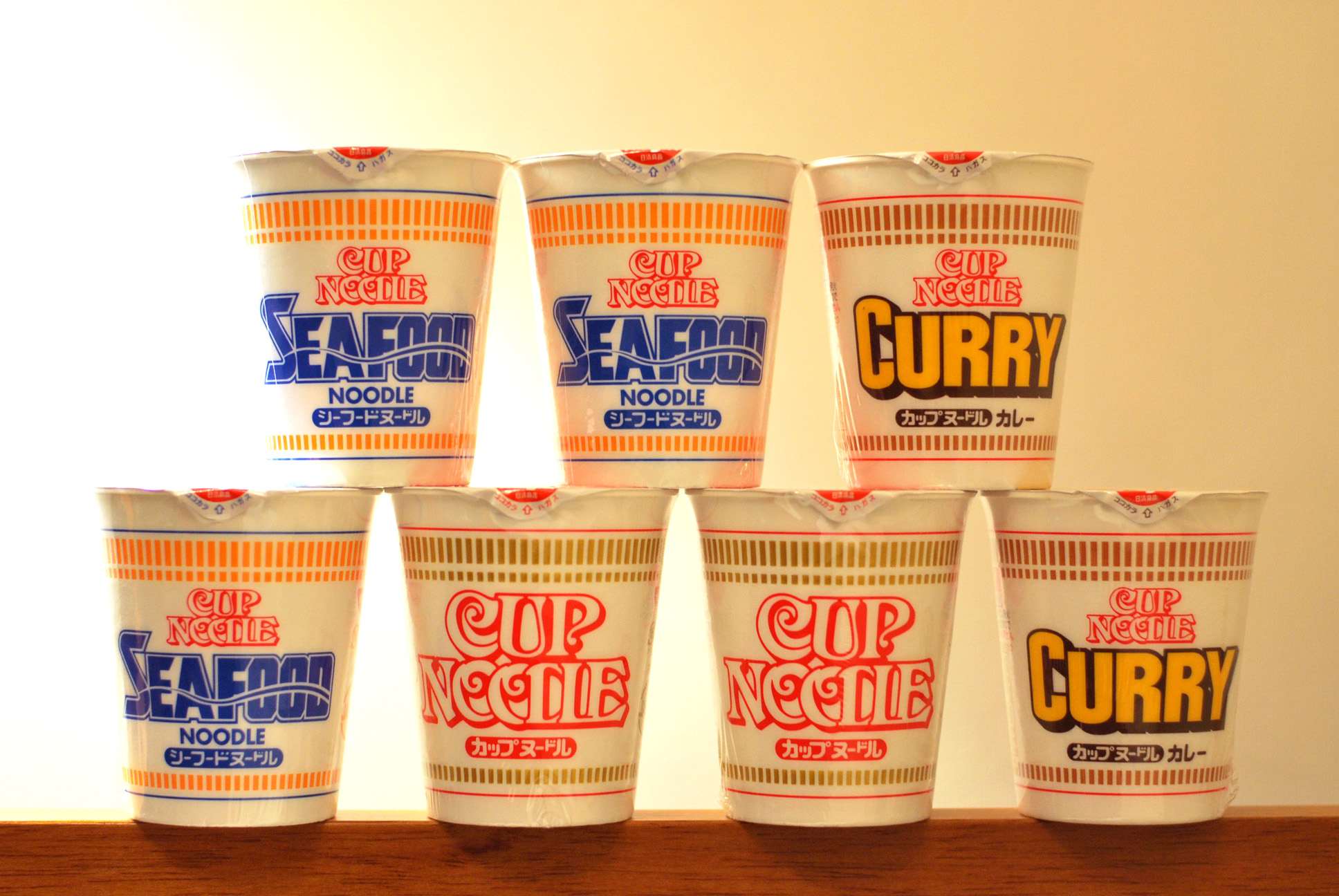
The packaging design of Cup Noodles is not eligible for copyright protection in Japan.

In Japanese copyright law, a work is considered eligible for protection when it is "a production in which thoughts or sentiments are expressed in a creative way and which falls within the literary, scientific, artistic or musical domain."

In a case law, Nissin Foods lost the case for the design of Cup Noodles packaging. Tokyo High Court ruled that although the shape is stylised, the text is in a normal arrangement and keeps its function of being read as a sequence of letters.

Japanese courts have decided that to be copyrightable, a text logo needs to have artistic appearance that is worth artistic appreciation. Logos composed merely of geometric shapes and texts are also not copyrightable in general.

=== Switzerland ===
A Swiss court considered this photograph of Christoph Meili to lack "individual character".

Copyright law of Switzerland defines works as being "creations of the mind, literary or artistic, that have an individual character." In a 2003 decision, the Federal Supreme Court of Switzerland ruled that a photo of Bob Marley taken at a concert by a spectator with a handheld camera was eligible for protection, because it had the required individual character by virtue of the aesthetic appeal of the picture, combined with the orientation of the picture's components and the distribution of light and shadow. It also found that the photograph was a "creation of the mind" by being shot at a specific time during the singer's movement on the stage.

By contrast, in the 2004 case Blau Guggenheim v. British Broadcasting Corporation, the Court found that a photo, shot by a reporter to document Christoph Meili with the files he had taken from his employer, lacked individual character. It found that the scope of conceptual and technical possibilities was not exploited, and that the photograph did not distinguish itself in any way from what was common use.

However, in an amendment to Swiss copyright law that took effect on 1 April 2020, "photographic depictions and depictions of three-dimensional objects produced by a process similar to that of photography" are now eligible for copyright, even if they do not display individual character, although their creation must still be the result of "human actions", and they are subject to a shorter copyright term (50 years after production rather than 70 years after the death of the author).

=== Taiwan ===
Taiwanese court ruled that a simple typeface with traditional elements like Chaotian Temple logos are uncopyrightable in Taiwan.

While the threshold of originality (原創性) is not defined in Taiwan's copyright law, it is used in practice. It is divided into "originality" (原始性) and "creativity" (創作性), which are derived from American, German, and Japanese legal systems. The Taiwan Intellectual Property Office describes that independently created works with "minimal creativity" are eligible for copyright protection, and courts in practice described that the threshold is refilled when "the works are recognisable from previous works that can show the creators' individuality by common sense of the society".

The threshold of originality in Taiwan will vary by court. Criminal justice tends to have a higher threshold to protect the defendant. Whether photographic works are copyrightable is usually affected by the debate. In case law, Sunshow (双手機電), a Chinese manufacturer, won the case for the design of their logo, which consisted of a graphic and a typeface. The Intellectual Property and Commercial Court (智慧財產及商業法院) ruled that while the graphic part of the logo was copyrightable, its typeface was not, and thus it was below the threshold of originality. In addition, traditional images are under the threshold of originality, and not protected by copyright.

=== United States ===
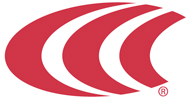
Car Credit City logo: US Copyright office ruled this logo too simple to be protected, but a slightly more complicated version was accepted for registration (authority).

The logo of Amtrak is not considered a "work of authorship" because it only consists of text in a simple typeface, so it is not an object of copyright in respect to US law.

In United States copyright law, the principle of requiring originality for copyright protection was invoked in the 1991 ruling of the United States Supreme Court in Feist Publications v. Rural Telephone Service. The court opinion stated that copyright protection could only be granted to "works of authorship" that possess "at least some minimal degree of creativity". As such, mere labour ("sweat of the brow") is not sufficient to establish a copyright claim. For example, the expression of some obvious methods of compilation and computation, such as the Yellow Pages or blank forms, cannot receive a copyright (demonstrated in Morrissey v. Procter & Gamble), but sufficiently original elements within the work itself can still be eligible for protection.

The Supreme Court similarly established in Star Athletica, LLC v. Varsity Brands, Inc. that artistic elements of a practical article (such as clothing) can be copyrighted if they meet the threshold of originality, and can be identified as art when they are mentally separated from the item's practical aspects.

==== Reproductions ====
The requirement of originality was also invoked in the 1999 United States District Court case Bridgeman Art Library v. Corel Corp. In the case, Bridgeman Art Library questioned the Corel Corporation's rights to redistribute their high quality reproductions of old paintings that had already fallen into the public domain due to age, claiming that it infringed on their copyrights. The court ruled that exact or "slavish" reproductions of two-dimensional works such as paintings and photographs that were already in the public domain could not be considered original enough for protection under US law, "a photograph which is no more than a copy of a work of another as exact as science and technology permits lacks originality. That is not to say that such a feat is trivial, simply not original".

Another court case related to threshold of originality was the 2008 case Meshwerks v. Toyota Motor Sales US In this case, the court ruled that wire-frame computer models of Toyota vehicles were not entitled to additional copyright protection since the purpose of the models was to faithfully represent the original objects without any creative additions.

In May 2016, Judge Percy Anderson ruled that remastered versions of musical recordings are eligible to receive a new copyright if they contain "multiple kinds of creative authorship, such as adjustments of equalization, sound editing and channel assignment", that are perceptible from the original work. This applies even if the work was only subject to common law state copyright as a sound recording published prior to 1972, thus making them become eligible for compulsory licences under federal copyright law. This was overruled in 2018 in a 3–0 ruling by the 9th Circuit Court of Appeals, which held that "A digitally remastered sound recording made as a copy of the original analog sound recording will rarely exhibit the necessary originality to qualify for independent copyright protection."

==== Typefaces and geometry ====
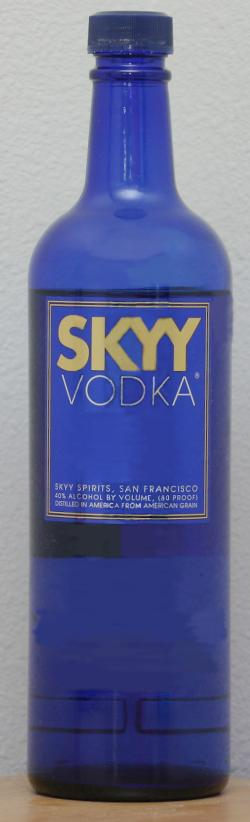
SKYY vodka bottle

House Report No. 94-1476 states that the design of a typeface cannot be protected under US law. The non-eligibility of "textual matter" was raised in Ets-Hokin v. Skyy Spirits Inc., judging whether photographs of bottles of SKYY vodka were original enough for protection:

The Skyy vodka bottle, although attractive, has no special design or other features that could exist independently as a work of art. It is essentially a functional bottle without a distinctive shape. Turning next to the bottle's label, which the district court also cited in part in categorizing Ets-Hokin's photos as derivative works, we note that "[a] claim to copyright cannot be registered in a print or label consisting solely of trademark subject matter and lacking copyrightable matter." Although a label's "graphical illustrations" are normally copyrightable, "textual matter" is not—at least not unless the text "aid[s] or augment[s]" an accompanying graphical illustration. The label on Skyy's vodka bottle consists only of text and does not include any pictorial illustrations.

==== Mechanically produced works ====
In works produced in a mechanical medium, "there is broad scope for copyright . . . because 'a very modest expression of personality will constitute originality.'" With respect to United States law, Stephen M. McJohn writes:

The limitation of copyright to "works of authorship" also implies an author. This appears to mean that a human created the work, using the requisite creativity. In a work made through a completely mechanical process, copyright might be denied on the basis that no one was the "author".

Difficulties arise when attempting to determine the boundary line between mechanical or random processes and instances in which the slight intervention of a human agent results in the production of a copyrightable work. The Congressional Office of Technology Assessment posited that the question is open as to whether computers are unlike other tools of creation in that they are possible of being co-creators. The US Copyright Office has taken the position that "in order to be entitled to copyright registration, a work must be the product of human authorship. Works produced by mechanical processes or random selection without any contribution by a human author are not registrable."

== The "sweat of the brow" doctrine ==
Some countries grant copyright protection based on how much labour and diligence it took to create a work, rather than or in addition to how original a work is. This is referred to as the "sweat of the brow" doctrine in relation to the idiom, "the sweat of one's brow".

The sweat of the brow doctrine has been recognised at various times in the United Kingdom, Canada, Australia, India, and elsewhere. The 1900 UK case Walter v. Lane ruled that the copyright of an account of a speech transcribed by a reporter belonged to the newspaper he worked for because of the effort it took to reproduce his spoken words.

Courts in the United States rejected this notion in Feist Publications v. Rural Telephone Service (1991) and Bridgeman Art Library v. Corel Corp. (1999). In these cases, the courts asserted that originality was required for copyright protection. Since the Feist decision, many common law countries have moved towards applying a similar standard. A similar precedent was set in Canada by cases such as Tele-Direct (Publications) Inc. v. American Business Information Inc. (1997), where the court concluded that compilations of data must embody originality and creativity in order to be copyrighted.

In March 2012, the European Court of Justice also set a similar precedent, ruling that Football DataCo could not claim copyright on association football match schedules due to the skill and labour used in their creation, as their compilation is "dictated by rules or constraints which leave no room for creative freedom". In November 2015, the United Kingdom's Intellectual Property Office clarified that it was "unlikely" that a digitised reproduction of a work out of copyright would be original enough to attain a new copyright.

== See also ==
- Derivative works
