= Bridgeman Art Library v. Corel Corp. =

U.S. legal case on copyright originality

- Court: United States District Court for the Southern District of New York
- Full case name: The Bridgeman Art Library, Ltd. v. Corel Corporation
- Decided: February 18, 1999
- Citation: 36 F. Supp. 2d 191, 1999 U.S. Dist. LEXIS 1731, 50 U.S.P.Q.2d (BNA) 1110

Case history
- Prior actions: Judgment for defendants, 25 F. Supp. 2d 421 (S.D.N.Y. 1998)

Holding
- Photographic reproductions of visual works in the public domain were not copyrightable because the reproductions involved no originality. Upon reconsideration and reargument, judgment was again entered for defendants.

Bridgeman Art Library v. Corel Corp., 36 F. Supp. 2d 191 (S.D.N.Y. 1999), was a decision by the United States District Court for the Southern District of New York, which ruled that exact photographic copies of public domain images could not be protected by copyright in the United States because the copies lack originality. Even though accurate reproductions might require a great deal of skill, experience, and effort, the key element to determine whether a work is copyrightable under US law is originality.

== Facts ==
Corel Corporation sold a CD-ROM called "Professional Photos CD Rom masters" in the UK, the US, and Canada which contained digitized images of paintings by European masters. Corel stated that it had obtained these images from a company called "Off the Wall Images", a company that no longer existed.

Bridgeman Art Library possessed a large library of photographs of paintings by European masters, as both transparencies and in digital form. The copyright terms on the paintings themselves had expired, but Bridgeman claimed that it owned a copyright on the photographs. It licensed copies of its photographs for a fee.

== Action ==
Bridgeman sued Corel. It claimed that since no other photographs of the public domain works had been authorized other than those that Bridgeman itself had been authorized to make, by the museums where the works were held, the only possible source for the digital images on Corel's CD-ROM was Bridgeman's own digitizations of its photographs. It claimed that since it owned the copyright on its photographs, Corel's copies were infringements of its copyright. Both parties moved for summary judgment.

== Judgment ==
Judge Lewis Kaplan in the Southern District Court of New York issued two judgments.

=== First judgment ===
On November 13, 1998, Kaplan granted the defendant's motion for a summary dismissal of the suit. The court applied UK law to determine whether the plaintiff's photographs were copyrightable in the first place, and applied US law to determine whether copyright had been infringed. It determined that Bridgeman's photographs were not original works, and could not be validly copyrighted under UK law. It further determined that even if the photographs were copyrightable, no infringement could be deemed to have occurred under US law, because the only way in which Bridgeman's and Corel's photographs were similar was that "both are exact reproductions of public domain works of art," so the only similarity between the two works was an uncopyrightable element: the public domain material itself. Therefore, under well-settled US law, there could be no infringement.

In the judgment, Kaplan noted that the court would have reached the same result had it applied US law throughout.

=== Plaintiff motions ===
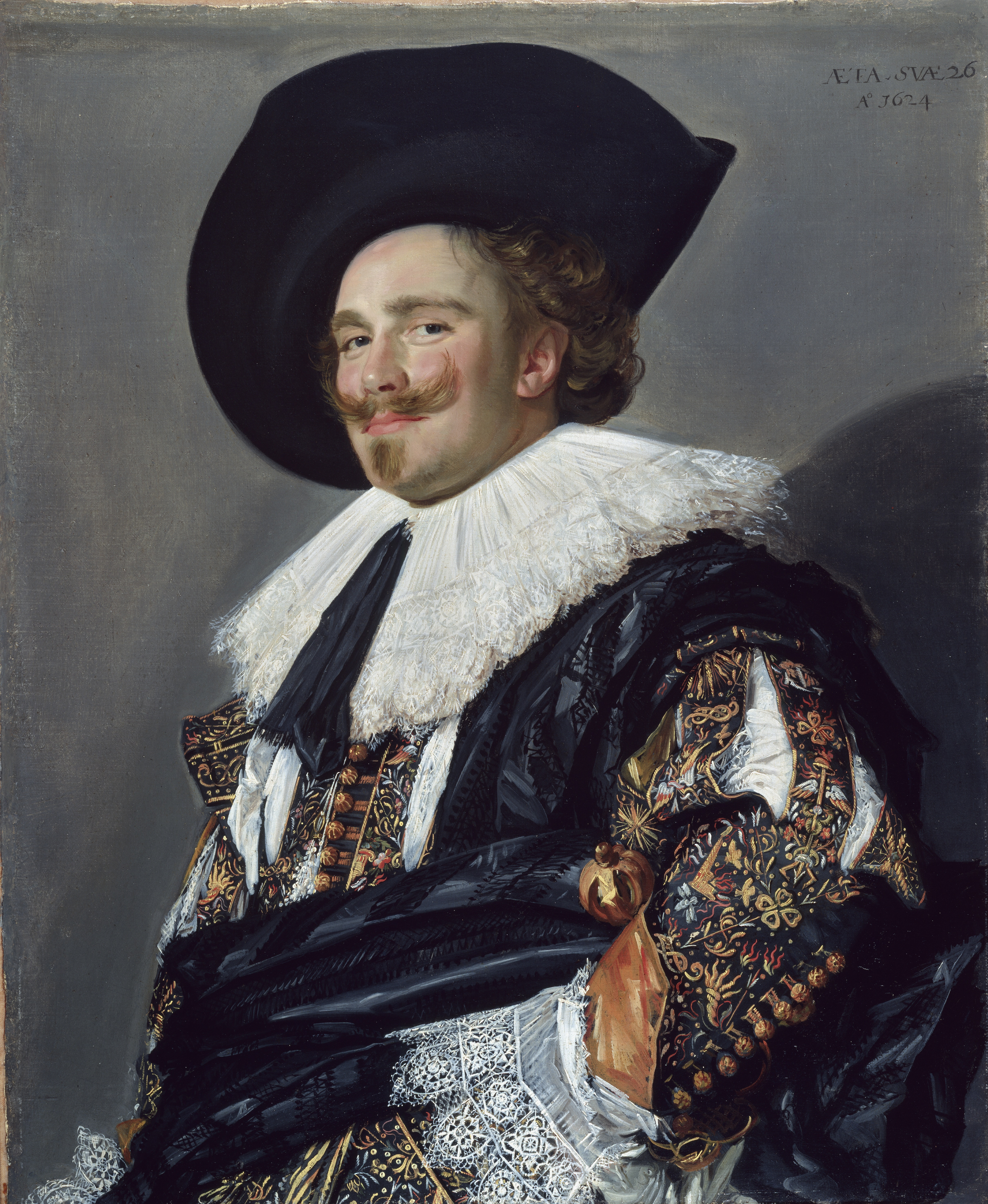
Laughing Cavalier, 1624, by Frans Hals. Bridgeman's image of this was the example used in the case.

The entry of the first summary judgment caused the court, in the words of Kaplan, to be "bombarded with additional submissions" from the plaintiff. The plaintiff moved, on November 23, for reconsideration and re-argument, on the grounds that the court's assessment of the copyrightability of the works was in error. In support of this motion it pointed to a certificate of copyright issued by the United States Register of Copyrights for one of Bridgeman's photographs, a photograph of the Laughing Cavalier. It asserted that the certificate demonstrated the subsistence of copyright. It further argued that the court had mis-applied UK copyright law, by not following Graves' Case.

The court also received an unsolicited letter from William F. Patry, who argued that the court had been incorrect to apply UK law at all. The plaintiff moved for the court to receive an amicus curiae brief from The Wallace Collection, addressing the UK law issue.

The plaintiff's motions were granted. The amicus curiae brief was filed, both parties were given leave to address the points raised by Patry's letter, and the case was re-argued and reconsidered.

Kaplan commented on the plaintiff's motions in the subsequent summary judgment, saying:

At the outset, it is worth noting that the post-judgment flurry was occasioned chiefly by the fact that the plaintiff failed competently to address most of the issues raised by this interesting case prior to the entry of final judgment. In particular, while plaintiff urged the application of UK law, it made no serious effort to address the choice of law issue and no effort at all (apart from citing the British copyright act) to bring pertinent UK authority to the Court's attention before plaintiff lost the case. Indeed, it did not even cite Graves' case, the supposedly controlling authority that the Court is said to have overlooked.

— Lewis A. Kaplan, The Bridgeman Art Library Ltd. v. Corel Corporation, 36 F. Supp. 2d 191 (SDNY 1999)

=== Second judgment ===
On February 26, 1999, Kaplan again granted the defendant's motion for a summary dismissal of the suit, in a second summary judgment.

In the judgment Kaplan considered Patry's arguments, the Copyright Clause in Article One of the United States Constitution, the Berne Convention for the Protection of Literary and Artistic Works, the Universal Copyright Convention, and the Berne Convention Implementation Act of 1988 (BCIA). In particular, he considered sections 3(a) and 4(a) of the BCIA, which amend title 17, chapter 1, § 101 of the United States Code.

The court inferred from the provisions of the BCIA, and the absence of US law to the contrary, that Congress had not granted foreign law the power to determine the issue of copyrightability in US copyright actions. In other words, Congress did not adopt the Second Restatement's rule, under which the law of the state with the most direct relation to the property (i.e. the UK in this case) would apply. In particular, the wording of section 4(a) of the BCIA prohibits copyrights from being claimed "by virtue of, or in reliance upon, the provisions of the Berne Convention or the adherence of the United States thereto". The application of UK law in the case would be in reliance upon the Berne Convention, therefore it could not apply and US law should be used to determine the copyrightability of the Bridgeman photographs.

Thus Kaplan applied US law to the issue of copyrightability, rather than UK law as in the first judgment. The second judgment provided a more detailed statement of the court's reasoning than the first judgment did. The court held that photographs were "writings" within the meaning of the Copyright Clause. It cited Melville Nimmer's Nimmer on Copyright, which stated that there "appear to be at least two situations in which a photograph should be denied copyright for lack of originality". Kaplan considered one of those situations, as described by Nimmer, to be directly relevant, namely that "where a photograph of a photograph or other printed matter is made that amounts to nothing more than slavish copying". A slavish photographic copy of a painting thus, according to Nimmer, lacks originality and thus copyrightability under the US Copyright Act.

Kaplan stated that there is "little doubt that many photographs, probably the overwhelming majority, reflect at least the modest amount of originality required for copyright protection", citing prior judgments that had stated that "[e]lements of originality [...] may include posing the subjects, lighting, angle, selection of film and camera, evoking the desired expression, and almost any other variant involved". But he ruled that the plaintiff, by its own admission, had performed "slavish copying", which did not qualify for copyright protection. "[I]ndeed", he elaborated, "the point of the exercise was to reproduce the underlying works with absolute fidelity". He noted that "[i]t is uncontested that Bridgeman's images are substantially exact reproductions of public domain works, albeit in a different medium".

Although the second judgment was based upon application of US law, Kaplan added that "[w]hile the Court's conclusion as to the law governing copyrightability renders the point moot, the Court is persuaded that plaintiff's copyright claim would fail even if the governing law were that of the United Kingdom." He referred to the Privy Council case of Interlego v Tyco Industries for equivalent case law in the UK, where it had been held that "[s]kill, labour or judgment merely in the process of copying cannot confer originality". Further, the Privy Council had held in Interlego that "[t]here must [...] be some element of material alteration or embellishment which suffices to make the totality of the work an original work", rendering the mere change in medium of a work, on its own, not sufficient for copyrightability. Thus the question of originality and copyrightability of a "slavish copy", even one where the medium changed (i.e. from a painting to a photograph, and thence to a digitization of that photograph), would be decided the same under UK law as under US law.

== Subsequent jurisprudence ==
As the decision of a federal district court, Bridgeman is not binding precedent on other federal or state courts, but it has nevertheless been highly influential as persuasive authority, and is widely followed by other federal courts.

Several federal courts have followed the ruling in Bridgeman. In Meshwerks v. Toyota, 528 F.3d 1258 (10th Cir. 2008), the Court of Appeals for the Tenth Circuit favorably cited Bridgeman v. Corel, extending the reasoning in Bridgeman to cover 3D wireframe meshes of existing 3D objects. The appeals court wrote "[T]he law is becoming increasingly clear: one possesses no copyright interest in reproductions ... when these reproductions do nothing more than accurately convey the underlying image". Specifically following Bridgeman, the appeals court wrote, "In Bridgeman Art Library, the court examined whether color transparencies of public domain works of art were sufficiently original for copyright protection, ultimately holding that, as 'exact photographic copies of public domain works of art,' they were not." The Meshwerks opinion also revisited a 1959 case, Alva Studios, Inc. v. Winninger, 177 F. Supp. 265 (S.D.N.Y. 1959), in which the district court enforced a copyright claimed on a reproduction sculpture of Rodin's Hand of God. The Meshwerks decision, however, specifically overturned that case: "We are not convinced that the single case to which we are pointed where copyright was awarded for a 'slavish copy' remains good law." The appeals court ruling cited and followed the United States Supreme Court decision in Feist Publications v. Rural Telephone Service (1991), explicitly rejecting difficulty of labor or expense as a consideration in copyrightability. This line of reasoning has been followed in other cases, such as Eastern America Trio Products v. Tang Electronic Corp, 54 USPQ2d 1776, 1791 (S.D.N.Y. 2000), where it was ruled that "[t]here is a very broad scope for copyright in photographs, encompassing almost any photograph that reflects more than 'slavish copying'."

The Bridgeman case has caused great concern among some museums, many of which receive income from licensing photographic reproductions of objects and works in their collections. Some of them have argued, as above, that the case has limited precedential value, or that (even though it was a federal court case) it has no application outside of the state of New York.

Others who reject the judgment on the Bridgeman case have pointed to Schiffer Publishing v. Chronicle Books as providing a contrary decision. However, in Schiffer, the facts of the case differed. In particular, the plaintiff had not been making any attempt at full fidelity with the works being photographed, and thus the photographs comprised an element of originality. As stated in Schiffer, "[t]he tone and value of colors in the Schiffer photograph[s] differed from those of the actual fabric swatch", meaning that not only was fidelity not achieved, but in fact the photographs were visibly inaccurate representations of the works photographed. The presiding judge in the case, Judge Berle M. Schiller, cited Bridgeman and went to great lengths to demonstrate that the material facts of Schiffer differ from those of Bridgeman. Bielstein concludes from this that far from Schiffer contradicting Bridgeman, it actually reinforces it and builds upon it, confirming that an "interpretive dimension or spark of originality" over and above "slavish copying", conferred originality and copyrightability.

== Relevance to UK law ==
As a US court case, Bridgeman Art Library v. Corel Corp. is not binding upon UK courts. However, because it follows dicta in Interlego, and cites Justice Laddie, it serves to raise doubt in UK law as to the originality of photographs that exactly replicate other works of art. An additional problem with taking the case as precedent would be reconciling it with the decision in Walter v Lane, given that an analogy can be made between the skills exercised by a journalist in verbatim reporting of a speech and the skills exercised by a photographer in exactly reproducing a work of art. However, Antiquesportfolio.com v Rodney Fitch & Co. also held that a slavish copy, such as re-using a photographic negative, re-photographing a print, or re-creating the effect of an earlier photograph, would not constitute an original work. Similarly, Lord Oliver's dicta in Interlego held that the effort of copying, itself, does not constitute originality.

The significance of the case and the doubts that it raised prompted the private Museums Copyright Group in the UK to commission an in-depth report on the case and to seek the opinion of Jonathan Rayner James, Q.C., a barrister who specialized in UK copyright law and a co-author of Copinger and Skone James on copyright. Rayner James' opinion, as reported by the group in a press release, was:

[A]s a matter of principle, a photograph of an artistic work can qualify for copyright protection in English law, and that is irrespective of whether [...] the subject of the photographs is more obviously a three dimensional work, such as a sculpture, or is perceived as a two dimensional artistic work, such as a drawing or painting [...]

— Jonathan Rayner James, Press release by Museums Copyright Group (elisions as made by the Museums Copyright Group)

Stokes (2001) argued that, under UK law, the photography of such works, by dint of the lighting and other techniques involved in producing a photograph that renders the work to best photographic effect (possibly better than what would be visible to a person viewing the original painting on display in the relevant museum), would constitute originality, per Laddie, and not merely a "slavish copy".

However, the review of UK authorities in the second judgment of Bridgeman Art Library v. Corel Corp. does highlight several points in UK law. For example, it draws attention to the fact that Graves' Case, dating as it does from 1867, no longer reflects the law of originality in the UK, in light of later cases such as Interlego.

The Bridgeman Art Library itself stated in 2006 that it is "looking for a similar test case in the UK or Europe to fight which would strengthen [its] position".

In November 2015, the Intellectual Property Office of the United Kingdom issued an official guide for individuals and businesses titled "Copyright Notice: digital images, photographs and the internet" that offers a judgment similar to that of Bridgeman v. Corel. Updated 4 January 2021, the section of the guidance titled, "Are digitised copies of older images protected by copyright?" states that:

However, according to established case law, the courts have said that copyright can only subsist in subject matter that is original in the sense that it is the author's own 'intellectual creation'. Given this criterion, it seems unlikely that what is merely a retouched, digitised image of an older work can be considered as 'original'. This is because there will generally be minimal scope for a creator to exercise free and creative choices if their aim is simply to make a faithful reproduction of an existing work.

In November 2017, 27 prominent art historians, museum curators and critics (including Bendor Grosvenor, Waldemar Januszczak, Martin Kemp, Janina Ramirez, Robin Simon, David Solkin, Hugh Belsey, Sir Nicholas Goodison, and Malcolm Rogers) wrote to The Times newspaper to urge that "fees charged by the UK's national museums to reproduce images of historic paintings, prints and drawings are unjustified, and should be abolished". They commented that "[m]useums claim they create a new copyright when making a faithful reproduction of a 2D artwork by photography or scanning, but it is doubtful that the law supports this". They argued that the fees inhibit the dissemination of knowledge, the very purpose of public museums and galleries, and so "pose a serious threat to art history". They therefore advised the UK's national museums "to follow the example of a growing number of international museums (such as the Netherlands' Rijksmuseum) and provide open access to images of publicly owned, out-of-copyright paintings, prints and drawings so that they are free for the public to reproduce".

A November 2023 Appeal Court judgement (THJ v. Sheridan, 2023) by Lord Justice Arnold clarified that, in the UK, no new copyright is created in making a photographic reproduction of a two-dimensional public domain artwork, and that this has been the case since 2009.

== See also ==
- Copyright protection of photographs in Switzerland for the equivalent leading cases in Switzerland
- Fair use
- National Portrait Gallery and Wikimedia Foundation copyright dispute
- Itar-Tass Russian News Agency v. Russian Kurier, Inc. – a case where foreign law was applied in the US for determining the ownership of works
