= Kurier (disambiguation) =

Kurier (the German term for courier or messenger) could refer to:

- Kurier – an Austrian newspaper
- Berliner Kurier – a Berlin newspaper
- Der Kurier – a former West Berlin Newspaper which appeared shortly after World War II
- Kurier system, a World War II burst transmission system for the German Navy
- Russian Kurier, a company involved in the Itar-Tass Russian News Agency v. Russian Kurier, Inc. case
