= Digital Future Coalition =

The Digital Future Coalition (DFC) was a US-based copyright advocacy organization established in 1995. Founded by leading scholars and activists in the library and public interest world, DFC was a precursor to organizations like Public Knowledge and the Library Research Coalition. The organization emerged from a round table of legal scholars and library associations members convened by Peter Jaszi in fall of 1995 to review the Clinton Administration's White Paper on Intellectual Property and the National Information Infrastructure, authored by Bruce Lehman. That White Paper proposed a variety of new legislative approaches within copyright, generally broadening its scope and reach, and the roundtable discussion brought forward the notion of establishing a lobbying group to counter the commercial copyright interests' lobbying groups.

The DFC had at its peak at least 42 institutional members, drawn from library associations, scholarly societies, public interest groups, and IT-related commercial entities. The organization was active in the legislative debates and lobbying surrounding the Digital Millennium Copyright Act, the Copyright Term Extension Act, and proposed database protection legislation, and was instrumental in inserting limiting provisions and exceptions into the DMCA and CTEA, and in defeating the proposed database protection legislation. (See Database and Collections of Information Misappropriation Act, H.R. 3261, 108th Congress.)

== Significant reports, comments, etc. ==
- Comments of the Digital Future Coalition, Aug./Sept. 2000, Submitted to the U.S. Copyright Office, Pursuant to Sec. 104 of the Digital Millennium Copyright Act, in Response to Request for Comments, 65 F.R. 35673.
- "Statement of the Digital Future Coalition Regarding W.I.P.O. Implementing Legislation", 1997.
- Statement of Intended Testimony of the Digital Future Coalition before the United States Copyright Office on incidental copies
- Collection of testimony and submissions in Copyright and the NII: Resources for the Library and Education Community, Association of Research Libraries (May 1996)

== Members ==
Membership rosters drawn from public comments and filings, but changed over time.

- Alliance for Public Technology
- American Association of Law Libraries
- American Association of Legal Publishers
- American Association of School Administrators
- American Committee for Interoperable Systems
- American Council of Learned Societies
- American Historical Association
- American Library Association
- Art Libraries Society of North America
- Association for Computers and the Humanities
- Association of American Geographers
- Association of Research Libraries
- Chief Officers of State Library Agencies
- College Art Association
- Committee of Concerned Intellectual Property Educators
- Computer and Communications Industry Association
- Computer Professionals for Social Responsibility
- Conference on College Composition and Communications
- Consortium for School Networking
- Consortium of Social Science Associations (COSSA)
- Consumer Federation of America (CFA)
- Consumer Project on Technology (CPT)
- Electronic Frontier Foundation
- Electronic Privacy Information Center
- Home Recording Rights Coalition
- International Society for Technology in Education (aka International Society for Telecommunications in Education)
- Medical Library Association
- Modern Language Association
- Music Library Association
- National Association of Independent Schools
- National Council of Teachers of English
- National Education Association
- National Humanities Alliance
- National Initiative for a Networked Cultural Heritage (NINCH)
- National School Boards Association
- National Writers Union
- Society for Cinema Studies
- Society of American Archivists
- Special Libraries Association
- United States Catholic Conference
- United States Distance Learning Association
- Visual Resources Association
