= Copyright in compilation =

Copyright in compilation is a facet of copyright law that may provide copyright protection to a compilation (or collection) of material, irrespective of copyright in the underlying material.

In the copyright law in the United States, such copyright may exist when the materials in the compilation (or "collective work") are selected, coordinated, or arranged creatively such that a new work is produced. Copyright does not exist when content is compiled without creativity, such as in the production of a telephone directory. In the case of compilation copyright, the compiler does not receive copyright in the underlying material, but only in the selection, coordination, or arrangement of that material.

In the European Union, copyright in compilation due to the creativity of selection and arrangement is one facet of the Database Directive of 1996, which also protects databases from extraction of substantial content that represents significant work by the compiler.

== Copyright of material used in compilation ==
A compilation may include any combination of public domain material or copyrighted material, owned by the compiler or others. If a compilation uses material under copyright by someone else, compilation protection does not grant the compiler rights to that material or permission to use it without license, and it does not give the compiler the right to prevent others from reusing the individual elements in the compilation. Rather, it exists independently of any copyright protection that may apply to the material used in the compilation itself.

Confusion sometimes occurs when the copyright status of the elements is conflated with the copyright status of the compilation. For instance, copyright on a filmed musical may lapse, but public display of the film without license may remain a copyright infringement if the songs performed therein are still protected by copyright.

== United States law ==
Along with derivative works, compilations are a type of work that employs material not created by the author while being copyrightable in its own right. Compilations are defined in the Copyright Act of 1976 as follows:

A "compilation" is a work formed by the collection and assembling of preexisting materials or of data that are selected, coordinated, or arranged in such a way that the resulting work as a whole constitutes an original work of authorship. The term "compilation" includes collective works. (17 U.S.C. § 101)

Compilations and derivative works represent different forms of authorship: compilations are formed by "selecting, bringing together, organizing, and arranging previously existing material of all kinds, regardless of whether the individual items in the material have been or ever could have been subject to copyright." On the other hand, derivative works are created by "recasting, transforming, or adapting one or more preexisting works" that are within the subject matter of copyright. Section 103 of the statute clarifies that a compilation of preexisting materials or data is copyrightable if it represents an original work of authorship in itself; the copyright status of the compilation is independent of that of the preexisting material.

=== Examples ===
Under the U.S. law, which protects the human creativity expressed in the selection, coordination, or arrangement of the material, the copyright office gives the following examples of compilations in which copyright might exist, as each represents compilations that reflect human creativity in preparation:

- A directory of the best services in a geographic region
- A list of the best short stories of 2011
- A collection of sound recordings of the top hits of 2004
- A book of greatest news photos
- A website containing text, photos and graphics
- An academic journal containing articles on a particular topic
- A newspaper comprised of articles by different journalists
- A catalog of texts and photographs.

=== Feist v. Rural (1991) ===
A critical case to the application of copyright in compilation in U.S. law is Feist Publications, Inc. v. Rural Telephone Service Co., 499 U.S. 340 (1991), in which the Supreme Court clarified the role of creativity in protection. In the case appealed, Feist had copied information from Rural's telephone listings to include in its own, after Rural had refused to license the information. Rural sued for copyright infringement. The Court ruled that information contained in Rural's phone directory was not copyrightable and that therefore no infringement existed.

Prior to this case, some U.S. courts were following the sweat-of-the-brow doctrine, which gave copyright to anyone who invested significant amount of time and energy into their work. At trial and appeal level, the courts followed this doctrine, siding with Rural. The appeal centered on two well-established principles in United States copyright law: facts are not copyrightable; compilations of facts can be copyrightable. In regard to collections of facts, Justice Sandra Day O'Connor stated that copyright can apply only to the creative aspects of collection: the creative choice of what data to include or exclude, the order and style in which the information is presented, etc., but not to the information itself. "Notwithstanding a valid copyright, a subsequent compiler remains free to use the facts contained in another's publication to aid in preparing a competing work, so long as the competing work does not feature the same selection and arrangement," O'Connor wrote.

The ruling has major implications for any project that serves as a collection of knowledge. Information (that is, facts, discoveries, etc.) from any source is fair game, but cannot contain any of the "expressive" content added by the source author. That includes not only the author's own comments, but also his choice of which facts to cover, his choice of which links to make among the bits of information, his order of presentation (unless it is something obvious like an alphabetical list), any evaluations he may have made about the quality of various pieces of information, or anything else that might be considered "original creative work" of the author rather than mere facts.

=== Lawful use requirement ===
The Copyright Act stipulates that "protection for a work employing preexisting material in which copyright subsists does not extend to any part of the work in which such material has been used unlawfully." (17 U.S.C. § 103(a)) The extent to which this limitation extends to infringing compilations as opposed to derivative works is debated, however. The Compendium of U.S. Copyright Office Practices states that it applies to compilations (including collective works), such as a mixtape with infringing copies of preexisting sound recordings. However, a compilation that contained only one infringing work out of many could retain copyright protection.

== The European Union Database Directive (1996) ==
Shortly after the Feist decision, the European Union began working to create a unified approach to copyright in compilation for databases. In 1996, it released its Database Directive, which incorporated approaches that had previously been used in much of continental Europe requiring creativity in the selection and arrangement of collected material and the sweat-of-the-brow approach of areas like the United Kingdom. Under Article 3 of the Directive, databases which, "by reason of the selection or arrangement of their contents, constitute the author's own intellectual creation" are protected by copyright as collections: no other criterion may be used by Member States. This may be a relaxation of the criterion for protection of collections in the Berne Convention for the Protection of Literary and Artistic Works, which covers collections "of literary and artistic works" and requires creativity in the "selection and arrangement" of the contents. Any copyright in the database is separate from and without prejudice to the copyright in the entries.

Copyright protection is not available for databases that aim to be "complete"—that is, where the entries are selected by objective criteria: these are covered by sui generis database rights. While copyright protects the creativity of an author, database rights specifically protect the "qualitatively and/or quantitatively [a] substantial investment in either the obtaining, verification or presentation of the contents": if there has not been substantial investment (which need not be financial), the database will not be protected.

Database rights are independent of any copyright in the database, and the two could, in principle, be held by different people.

== See also ==
- Collective work
  - Collective works in United States copyright law
- Derivative work
