= SportsCastr =

SportCastr
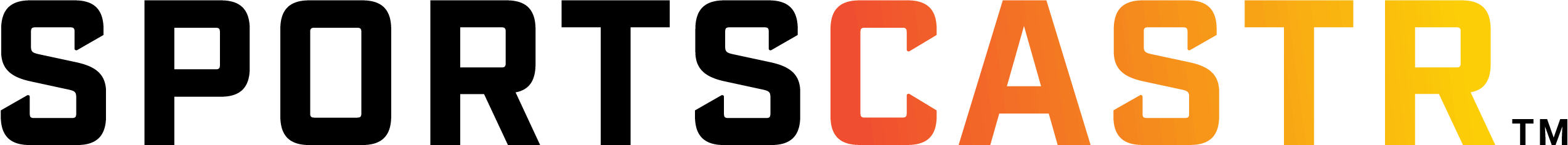

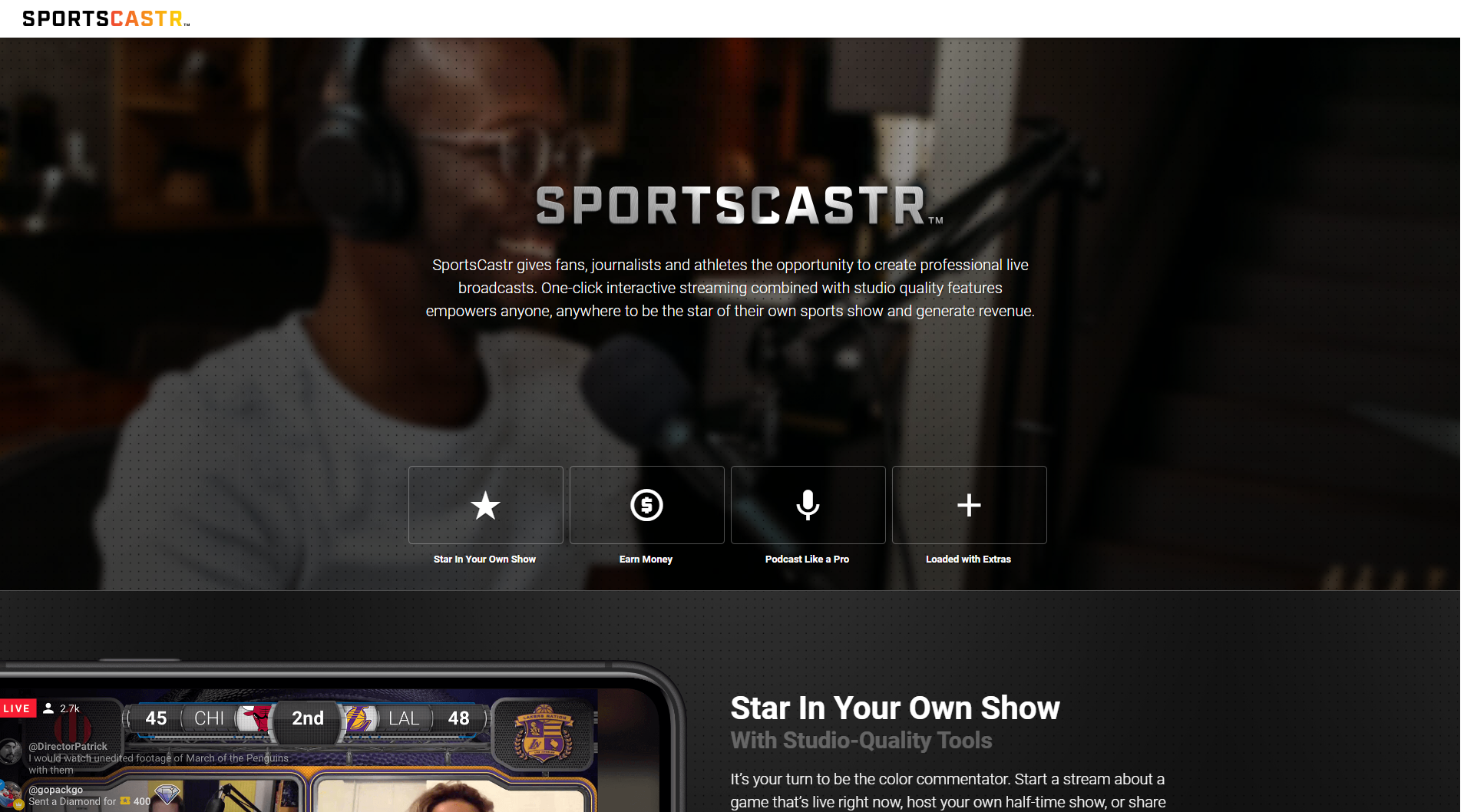
- Website type: Live streaming
- Available in: English
- Creators: David Stern, Jim Boeheim, Donald Schupak, Kevin April, Andrew Schupak and Peter Azuolas
- Website: sportscastr.com pandainteractive.com
- Commercial: Yes
- Launched: 2016
- Current status: Active

SportsCastr (doing business as "PANDA Interactive") is a digital media platform founded by Donald Schupak, Kevin April, Andrew Schupak and Peter Azuolas, along with Commissioner of the NBA Emeritus David Stern, NBA TV's Steve Smith, Syracuse University head basketball coach Jim Boeheim, and NFL legends Vernon Davis and Richard Sherman. The company is also known as PANDA Interactive and currently develops "watch & bet" software for sportsbooks and sports media companies.

== Partnerships ==
Since 2018, SportsCastr is an official licensee of the National Football League Players Association (NFLPA). The NFLPA also produced current and former NFL-player content to feature on the platform via ACE Media, the association’s content and production incubator.

In 2020, the National Basketball Players Association (NBPA) and SportsCastr launched the NBPA’s Broadcaster U. Virtual Game Call Program. The Virtual Game Call Program is a broadcasting training camp held by National Basketball Players Association (NBPA) in association with the Newhouse School of Public Communications at Syracuse University. Over the course of this new Program, players will gain experience virtually, learning basic broadcasting techniques and tips from experts and practicing their TV color commentary via a private platform provided by SportsCastr.

== Legal ==
In October 2023, SportsCastr filed lawsuits against industry giants Sportradar and Genius Sports in Texas court, alleging patent infringement of its interactive streaming solution. The focus of the dispute is SportsCastr’s proprietary cloud-based software, which provides real-time interactive viewing experiences for sports enthusiasts.

In March 2025, SportsCastr amended the lawsuits to also include antitrust claims against Sportradar and Genius Sports.
