= Kevin April =

Canadian media technology entrepreneur

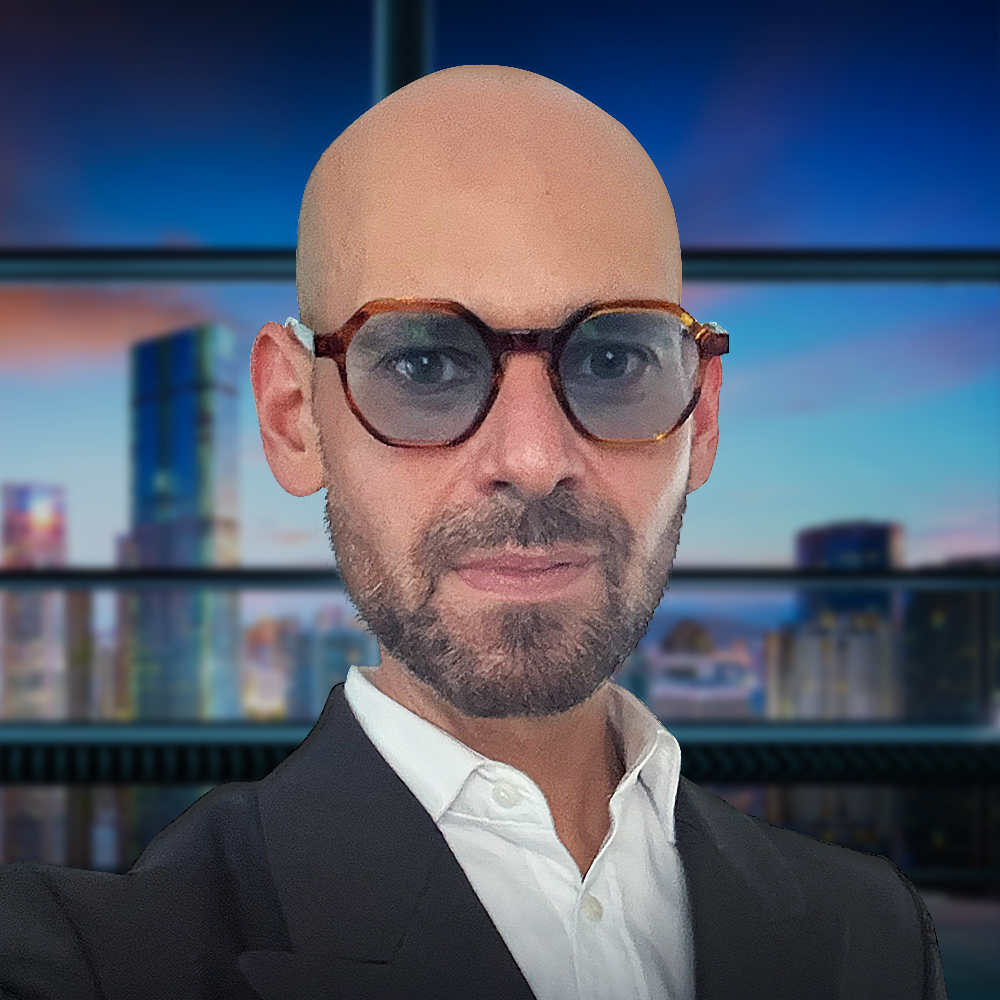
- Born: Montreal
- Occupation: Entrepreneur

Kevin April is a Canadian entrepreneur and media technology executive who co-founded several digital platforms used by millions of users and adopted by organizations including the NFL, NBA, and WNBA Players Associations. He is best known for founding ventures at the intersection of sports, streaming, and user-generated content, including Spymac, SportsBlog, SportsCastr, and PANDA Interactive.

== Early career ==
As a teenager., April co-founded Spymac, an Apple-focused online community that grew to become the largest Mac-focused social network of its time.

By 2004, the platform had grown to over 600,000 users and had more than 25 employees. It continued to expand in the following years, reaching over 1 million members by 2007.

It was notable for launching a 1GB free email service prior to the release of Gmail.

Spymac also developed a suite of cloud services and web publishing tools known as "Wheel," which the company announced at Macworld San Francisco in 2004.

It drew attention from Wired, ZDNet, and the Chicago Tribune, which highlighted its rapid growth, innovative features, and early embrace of cloud-based infrastructure and social networking features.

== SportsBlog ==
In the early 2010s, April co-founded SportsBlog.com, a digital publishing platform. The platform enabled any sports fan, journalist, or professional athlete to start a blog and engage directly with their audience, and the company partnered with the NFL, NBA Players Association, WNBA Players Association, and the National Basketball Retired Players Association to develop athlete-specific apps and media tools, including the first mobile apps built exclusively for NBA, WNBA, and retired NBA players.

In 2014, Sports Business Journal highlighted SportsBlog's collaboration with the WNBA Players Association as part of a broader effort to help athletes build their personal brands and engage directly with fans through digital publishing.

That same year, the NBA Players Association also worked with SportsBlog to launch a fan-sourced logo redesign contest as part of a broader rebranding initiative under new executive director Michele Roberts.

In 2015, the NBA Players Association launched a player-specific mobile app developed in partnership with SportsBlog to improve communication with its members. The app included video messaging, union contact features, and the ability to appeal technical fouls.

Around that time, CBS New York featured the platform in a segment on the rise of athlete-led media. By then, SportsBlog was generating over 40 million page views per month and ranked by comScore as the 21st most popular sports site online.

Fast Company recognized the platform's pioneering role in athlete-driven storytelling—launched two years before The Players' Tribune—and its influence on the shift toward direct athlete-to-fan communication.

== SportsCastr ==
In 2016, April co-founded and served as CEO of SportsCastr, a live-streaming platform that allowed fans and athletes to commentate on live sporting events in real time. The platform launched in 2017 and enabled users to become on-air commentators with interactive tools like live scoreboards, graphics, and chat features. It received investment from the NFL Players Association, as well as several high-profile sports figures including NBA Commissioner Emeritus David Stern, Syracuse University head coach Jim Boeheim, NBA TV analyst Steve Smith, Super Bowl champion Vernon Davis.

As with SportsBlog, SportsCastr partnered with players' associations including the NBA and WNBA Players Associations to help athletes gain more direct control over their digital presence. In 2020, it powered Broadcaster U: Virtual, a remote media training program developed with the NBPA to prepare players for careers in broadcasting.

Front Office Sports and GeekWire described the platform as part of a broader trend in which athletes and fans gained direct control over their digital media experience, redefining traditional sports broadcasting through interactivity and personalization.

== PANDA Interactive ==
In 2020, April transitioned SportsCastr into PANDA Interactive, a platform designed to integrate live video streaming with real-time sports data, interactive graphics, and betting integrations. The platform has been used by leagues such as the National Basketball League of Canada, The Basketball League, Ukrainian Premier League, and the Pro League Network.

A 2024 Sports Business Journal article highlighted PANDA's role in helping niche leagues reach fans, monetize engagement, and incorporate betting content without compromising the viewing experience.

April is a named inventor on several U.S. patents related to real-time video streaming and interactive sports data overlays, including US 11,871,088 B2, US 11,039,218 B1, and US 10,425,697 B2. In 2023, PANDA Interactive initiated legal action against Genius Sports and Sportradar for patent infringement, and in 2025 expanded the litigation to include anti-competitive conduct.

== Litigation with Genius Sports and Sportradar ==
In October 2023, PANDA Interactive filed a patent infringement lawsuit against Genius Sports and Sportradar, alleging unauthorized use of PANDA's technologies related to interactive streaming and sports betting overlays. The complaint identified Genius Sports' BetVision and Sportradar's emBet, among other products, as infringing on PANDA's patented technologies.

In March 2025, PANDA expanded the lawsuit to include antitrust claims, alleging that the defendants engaged in unlawful tying practices by bundling access to exclusive league data with proprietary betting technologies. PANDA cited exclusive league contracts with the NFL, NBA, NHL, MLB, and NCAA as contributing to market distortion. April described the lawsuit as a stand for innovation and fair competition, emphasizing that dominant firms were using their positions to suppress independent technology providers.
