= IceTV Pty Ltd v Nine Network Australia Pty Ltd =

Judgement of the High Court of Australia

- Court: High Court of Australia
- Full case name: IceTV Pty Ltd v Nine Network Australia Pty Ltd
- Decided: 22 April 2009
- Citations: [2009] HCA 14; (2009) 239 CLR 458; 254 ALR 386; 83 ALJR 585

Case history
- Prior actions: Nine Network Australia Pty Ltd v IceTV Pty Ltd [2007] FCA 1172 Nine Network Australia Pty Ltd v IceTV Pty Ltd [2008] FCAFC 71; (2008) 168 FCR 14 Nine Network Australia Pty Ltd v IceTV Pty Ltd [No 2] [2008] FCAFC 154

Court membership
- Judges sitting: French CJ, Gummow, Hayne, Heydon, Crennan and Kiefel JJ

Case opinions
- Appeal allowed. IceTV's use of time and title information was not a reproduction of a substantial part of Nine's weekly schedules in the qualitative sense required to constitute copyright infringement.

IceTV Pty Ltd v Nine Network Australia Pty Ltd is a 2009 decision of the High Court of Australia concerning the application of copyright law to a compilation of television schedules broadcast by the Nine Network and published by IceTV.

== Background ==
IceTV provided a subscription-based television program guide known as the "IceGuide," which used time and title information obtained in part from aggregated guides published in newspapers and online. Nine broadcast television according to a weekly schedule which was incorporated into the aggregated guides.

Nine argued before a single judge of the Federal Court of Australia that IceTV's reproduction of time and title information from the aggregated guides amounted to reproduction of a substantial part of the weekly schedules which had been prepared by Nine Network staff. On that basis, Nine argued that IceTV had infringed Nine's copyright in the weekly schedule. The trial judge disagreed. Nine successfully appealed to the Full Court of the Federal Court. The High Court granted IceTV special leave to appeal against the Full Court's decision.

== Judgment ==
French CJ, Crennan and Kiefel JJ explained that the information–expression dichotomy has been central to the social contract which has underpinned copyright law since the Statute of Anne. While both the primary judge and the Full Court had considered whether there had been an "appropriation" of the author's skill and labour, their Honours emphasised the need to "focus on the nature of the skill and labour, and in particular to ask whether it is directed to the originality of the particular form of expression." The evidence disclosed considerable skill and labour involved in programming decisions, but that skill and labour was not directed to the originality of the particular form of expression of the time and title information used by IceTV.

Gummow, Hayne and Heydon JJ reviewed the history of copyright law in Australia and the United States, noting the protection for "compilations of data" required by the 1994 TRIPS Agreement and 1996 Database Directive. Their Honours emphasised the dangers of adopting the rhetoric of "appropriation" of "skill and labour," which of itself cannot determine the issue of infringement of a copyright work. Referring to Nichols v. Universal Pictures Corp., they found that the Full Court "approached the issue of substantiality at too high a level of abstraction, and in doing so tipped the balance too far against the interest of viewers of digital free to air television in the dissemination by means of new technology of programme listings."

All six judges agreed that the appeal should be allowed, and the orders of the trial judge dismissing Nine's claim restored.

== Consequences ==
The decision in IceTV transformed Australian copyright law, by placing a new emphasis on the role of an author or authors in producing original works. It suggested that the courts might be retreating from the position held or assumed in previous cases, particularly Telstra Corporation Ltd v Desktop Marketing Systems Pty Ltd, which focused on the skill and labour used simply to create the compilation and the interests of the creator and copier.

While Australia has traditionally applied a low threshold of originality for copyright protection, the Australian Copyright Council identified IceTV as the beginning of a trend away from this approach. Subsequent decisions of the Federal Court of Australia have applied IceTV by finding that copyright does not subsist in newspaper headlines or telephone directories.

== See also ==
- Telstra Corporation Ltd v Desktop Marketing Systems Pty Ltd
- Copyright law of Australia
- Database right
- Australian Digital Alliance § IceTV Pty Ltd v Nine Network Australia Pty Ltd (2009) - amicus curiae in this case
