= Playerhistory.com =

Internet association football database

- Company type: Private
- Founded: Tromsø, Norway
- Headquarters: Tromsø, Norway
- Area served: Worldwide
- Founder: Håkon André Winther
- Key people: Håkon André Winther (Owner)
- Revenue: Unknown
- Employees: Approx. 90 (volunteers)

Playerhistory.com is an internet association football statistics database, founded in April 2002 by former footballer Håkon André Winther (born 15 September 1969 in Tromsø).

Maintained by a team of volunteers from all over the world, it is one of the largest websites of its kind. As of August 2009, when Football DataCo threatened legal action in a dispute over fixtures, the site contains more than 340,000 player profiles, 40,000 club details and more than 1,600,000 match results.

Playerhistory.com's material has been reproduced in media sources including Aftenposten, and Bladet Tromsø.
