= Australian Libraries Copyright Committee =

Australian trade association

- Formation: 1994
- Founder: Tom Cochrane
- Headquarters: National Library of Australia
- Location: Canberra
- Chair: Margaret Allen
- Affiliations: Australian Digital Alliance
- Website: www.libcopyright.org.au

The Australian Libraries Copyright Committee (ALCC) is an Australian organisation dealing with copyright law. It has a particular focus with relevance for the GLAM sector in Australia. It is related to the Australian Digital Alliance.

Formed in 1994 to attend to copyright issues affecting the library, archive and information sectors, the ALCC became an incorporated body in 2015. The ALCC is focused upon law reform in the Australian legal system. It regularly provides updated information and interpretation about legislation.

Legislation relative to copyright issues with Australia being signatory to international treaties, has seen the committee attend to low level publicised legislation such as the Disability and Other Measures Act.

The ALCC is based at the National Library of Australia in Canberra.

== Publications ==
- Lee, Miranda; Australian Libraries Copyright Committee (2000), Copyright bulletin, Australian Libraries Copyright Committee
