= Database and Collections of Information Misappropriation Act =

Proposed bill in the United States House of Representatives

The Database and Collections of Information Misappropriation Act, H.R. 3261, was a proposed bill in the United States House of Representatives during the 108th United States Congress. It would have altered copyright law to permit assertion of copyright ownership over factual data.

Proponents argued that the bill was based on the 1996 EU Database Directive, and was designed to encourage database creators by ensuring their revenue advantage. Opponents, who included Google and Verizon argued that it would restrict access to and use of facts.

In March 2004, the House Energy and Commerce Committee unfavorably reported H.R. 3261. The committee approved a competing, less comprehensive bill, the Consumer Access to Information Act H.R. 3872, which dealt only with "time sensitive" information, and would have instructed the Federal Trade Commission to take action against unfair trade practices.

== See also ==
- Digital Future Coalition
- Feist Publications, Inc., v. Rural Telephone Service Co., a 1991 court case establishing that information alone cannot be copyrighted
