= Secondary creations in Hong Kong =

Secondary creations in Hong Kong (simplified Chinese: 二次创作; traditional Chinese: 二次創作), also known as derivative works in Hong Kong, edit or add new elements to existing songs, commonly to express an opinion. According to the Concerned Group for Rights of Derivation Works, "Secondary creations are ubiquitous". Secondary creations are not believed to violate copyright laws, since their theme (and meaning) are obviously different from the original works. Secondary creators do not claim that their works are derived from others, but are original (and, therefore, not plagiarism).

== History ==
=== 1960s and 1970s ===
Secondary creations of songs in Hong Kong began during the 1960s. Songs were derived from Chinese opera, Disney musicals (such as The Sound of Music), Western classical music, and popular Western or Japanese songs. Cheng Gwan-min's 1968 song "Going Out, No Money to Buy Bread" (Chinese: 落街無錢買麵包), a parody, was derived from the Cantonese opera Princess Changping and reflected poverty in contemporary Hong Kong.

=== 1980s and 1990s ===
During the 1980s, comedy and variety television shows became popular. The variety show Enjoy Yourself Tonight included many secondary creations. Comedians Andrew Lam and Eric Tsang became well known in the 1990s for rewriting song lyrics in the mo lei tau genre.

=== After 2000 ===
Commercial use of secondary creations of songs continued since the 1980s. With the increasing influence of the Internet, reproduction of songs switched from television to Internet forums and online video platforms. Internet music channels and musicians re-create songs parodying contemporary political and social issues and entertainment events or translated into Cantonese.

HKGolden has a forum for members to discuss topics related to music, enabling them to publish re-written songs anonymously. Songs collectively re-composed on the channel may be posted on YouTube or another social networking platform. In 2009, the number of posts to the forum reached 10,000. Rewritten lyrics of The World of Locust 《蝗蟲天下》（原曲：富士山下）(2011), the second production of a Cantonese pop song, reflected antipathy towards the behavior of mainland tourists in Hong Kong. Its YouTube video had more than 1,460,000 views by 2016. Champion of Warmth Losses 《失暖王》原：失戀王 (2016) parodied cold Siberian weather in late January 2016.

== Copyright ==
Secondary creations have been uploaded to YouTube as political or social commentary and entertainment; most are by non-profit creators. Some secondary creations have attracted attention to the original works. Secondary creations of songs may be considered fair use.

Copyright protects a creator's effort and originality. Secondary creations, based on additions to an original work, may or may not infringe copyright. "New" works might alter the public image of a brand; the Hong Kong Disneyland has been parodied as "Buddhaland".

The proposed Copyright (Amendment) Bill 2014 created confusion about secondary creations. If the secondary creation is considered under the exception categories of being a parody, satire, pastiche, caricature or commentary, it may not be considered copyright infringement. Some believed that the bill would restrict freedom of expression and creation because it would allow a copyright owner to disallow secondary creators from using those exceptions. As this would making a secondary creation ineligible for copyright exceptions, the copyright owner could file a civil case against any secondary creator who parodied their work. The copyright sector, led by the Hong Kong Copyright Alliance, hoped the bill would fight piracy on the Internet.
