= Covers.com =

Website offering data for sports betting

- Website type: Sports betting information and analysis
- Available in: English
- Founded: June 1995; 31 years ago
- Headquarters: Post Falls, Idaho, United States
- Area served: Worldwide
- Founders: Paul Lavers; Joe MacDonald
- Products: Odds, data feeds, analysis tools, forums, mobile app
- Website: covers.com
- Advertising: Yes
- Commercial: Yes
- Registration: Optional (free)
- Current status: Active

Covers.com, formerly known as SportsDirect, is an online publication that provides sports-related information and data analysis. It is based in Post Falls, Idaho, United States.

== History ==
Covers.com was founded in 1995 by Paul Lavers and Joe MacDonald as an online information platform for sports bettors. Based in Halifax, Nova Scotia, the platform gained popularity among sports betting enthusiasts due to its extensive coverage of betting data.

For the 1997 World Figure Skating Championships in Lausanne, Switzerland, SportsDirect developed the first website to provide real-time coverage of the event. During the early 2000s, Covers.com became a notable affiliate and information resource for sportsbooks. In 2005, it acquired Wagerline.com.

In 2007, Covers was awarded Halifax's business of the year award.

In 2009, the founders divided their business interests: Lavers focused on a sister company (SportsDirect Inc.), while MacDonald became the sole owner of Covers.com. Under MacDonald's direction, Covers expanded its content and international audience.

In 2015, Covers Media Group, which operated Covers.com, was acquired by Gracenote, a U.S.-based data firm owned at the time by Tribune Media, as part of an expansion into sports statistics services. The acquisition also included SportsDirect Inc., with the combined transaction valued at approximately $54 million. Following the acquisition, Covers operated as part of Tribune Media's digital assets.Tribune sold Gracenote to Nielsen in 2017 but retained Covers.com as a direct consumer-focused property.

In 2022, Covers and Postmedia Network agreed to distribute betting analysis and odds content across Postmedia's national news outlets.

Covers was included in a $1.2 billion acquisition by Genius Sports in February 2026.

== Platform ==
Covers.com is an online platform providing sports betting information and tools to users. It publishes real-time content covering major sports leagues and events and released a mobile app in May, 2026. The platform also hosts community forums where users discuss betting picks, and offers free-to-play contests. It has an active community of 20 million users.
