= Spymac =

Spymac was an online Macintosh community and rumour site launched at the end of 2001 by Holger Ehlis and Kevin April, which grew to be the largest Macintosh community at the time, having around 600,000 users and 25 employees as of 2004. Spymac was known for innovative marketing and technology that led to its growth, such as the first-to-market 1GB email service, which launched even before Google's Gmail, causing an influx of new users, and Wheel, a suite of online services that competed with Apple's .Mac, which included the aforementioned email service, backups, and website hosting.

However, outcry over the site's "Leapfrog" redesign, which followed Web 2.0 principles, lead to many long-time users leaving. The redesign marked a transition for the site, which switched away from being a Mac forum to a video upload site that paid users a portion of advertising revenue. By March 2007, the site had over one million users.
