= Feist Publications, Inc. v. Rural Telephone Service Co. =

- Supreme Court of the United States

Argued January 9, 1991 Decided March 27, 1991
- Full case name: Feist Publications, Incorporated v. Rural Telephone Service Company, Incorporated
- Citations: 499 U.S. 340 (more) 111 S. Ct. 1282; 113 L. Ed. 2d 358; 1991 U.S. LEXIS 1856; 59 U.S.L.W. 4251; 18 U.S.P.Q.2d (BNA) 1275; Copy. L. Rep. (CCH) ¶ 26,702; 68 Rad. Reg. 2d (P & F) 1513; 18 Media L. Rep. 1889; 121 P.U.R.4th 1; 91 Cal. Daily Op. Service 2217; 91 Daily Journal DAR 3580

Case history
- Prior: Summary judgment for plaintiff, 663 F. Supp. 214 (D. Kan. 1987); affirmed, 916 F.2d 718 (10th Cir. 1990); affirmed, full opinion at 1990 U.S. App. LEXIS 25881 (10th Cir. 1990); cert. granted, 498 U.S. 808 (1990).

Holding
- The white pages of a telephone book did not satisfy the minimum originality required by the Constitution to be eligible for copyright protection, and effort and expenditure of resources are not protected by copyright. Tenth Circuit Court of Appeals reversed.

Court membership
- Chief Justice William Rehnquist Associate Justices Byron White · Thurgood Marshall; Harry Blackmun · John P. Stevens; Sandra Day O'Connor · Antonin Scalia; Anthony Kennedy · David Souter

Case opinions
- Majority: O'Connor, joined by Rehnquist, White, Marshall, Stevens, Scalia, Kennedy, Souter
- Concurrence: Blackmun

Laws applied
- U.S. Const. Art. I § 8

Feist Publications, Inc. v. Rural Telephone Service Co., 499 U.S. 340 (1991), was a landmark decision by the Supreme Court of the United States establishing that information alone without a minimum of original creativity cannot be protected by copyright. In the case appealed, Feist had copied information from Rural's telephone listings to include in its own, after Rural had refused to license the information. Rural sued for copyright infringement. The Court ruled that information contained in Rural's phone directory was not copyrightable and that therefore no infringement existed.

== Background ==
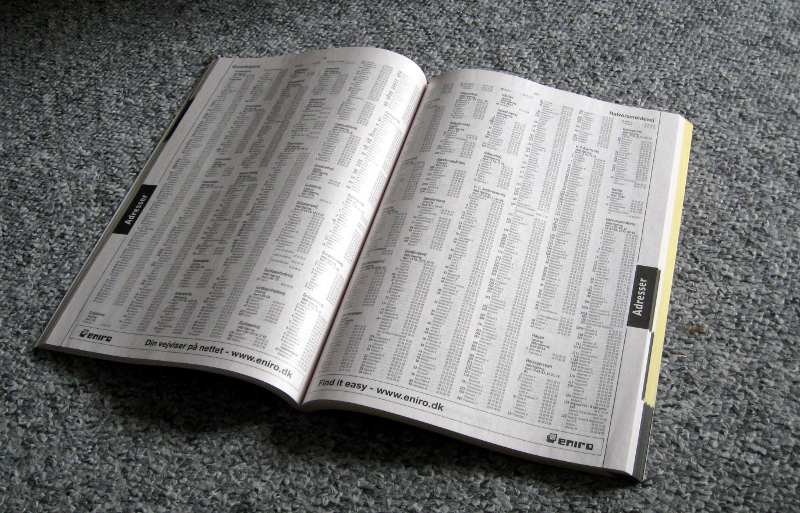
The "white pages" of a telephone directory

Rural Telephone Service Company, Inc. is a telephone cooperative providing services for areas in northwest Kansas, with headquarters in the small town of Lenora, in Norton County. The company was under a statutory obligation to compile and distribute a "white pages" phone directory of all its customers free of charge as a condition of its monopoly franchise.

Feist Publications, Inc. specialized in compiling telephone directories from larger geographic areas than Rural from other areas of Kansas. It had licensed the directory of 11 other local directories, with Rural being the only holdout in the region. Despite Rural's denial of a license to Feist, Feist copied 4,000 entries from Rural's directory. Because Rural had placed a small number of phony entries to detect copying, Feist's copying was evidenced.

Before this case, the substance of copyright in United States law followed the sweat of the brow doctrine, which gave copyright to anyone who invested significant amount of time and energy into their work. At trial and appeal level the courts followed this doctrine, siding with Rural.

== Ruling of the court ==
The ruling of the court was written by Justice Sandra Day O'Connor. It examined the purpose of copyright and explained the standard of copyrightability as based on originality.

The case centered on two well-established principles in United States copyright law: that facts are not copyrightable, and that compilations of facts can be.

"There is an undeniable tension between these two propositions", O'Connor wrote in her opinion. "Many compilations consist of nothing but raw data—i.e. wholly factual information not accompanied by any original expression. On what basis may one claim a copyright upon such work? Common sense tells us that 100 uncopyrightable facts do not magically change their status when gathered together in one place. … The key to resolving the tension lies in understanding why facts are not copyrightable: The "Sine qua non of copyright is originality."

Rural claimed a collection copyright in its directory. The court clarified that the intent of copyright law was not, as claimed by Rural and some lower courts, to reward the efforts of persons collecting information—the so-called "sweat of the brow" or "industrious collection" doctrine—but rather "to promote the Progress of Science and useful Arts" (U.S. Const. Art. I, § 8, cl. 8)—that is, to encourage creative expression.

The standard for creativity is extremely low. It need not be novel; it need only possess a "spark" or "minimal degree" of creativity to be protected by copyright.

In regard to collections of facts, O'Connor wrote that copyright can apply only to the creative aspects of collection: the creative choice of what data to include or exclude, the order and style in which the information is presented, etc.—not to the information itself. If Feist were to take the directory and rearrange it, it would avoid the copyright owned in the data. "Notwithstanding a valid copyright, a subsequent compiler remains free to use the facts contained in another's publication to aid in preparing a competing work, so long as the competing work does not feature the same selection and arrangement", she wrote.

The court held that Rural's directory was nothing more than an alphabetic list of all subscribers to its service, which it was required to compile under law, and that no creative expression was involved. That Rural spent considerable time and money collecting the data was irrelevant to copyright law, and Rural's copyright claim was dismissed.

All the justices joined O'Connor's opinion except Harry Blackmun, who concurred only in judgment, but did not file a separate opinion.

== Implications ==
The ruling has major implications for any project that serves as a collection of knowledge. Information (facts, discoveries, etc.) from any source is fair game, but cannot contain any of the "expressive" content added by the source author. That includes not only the author's own comments, but also their choice of which facts to cover, which links to make among the bits of information, the order of presentation (unless it is something obvious like alphabetical), evaluations of the quality of various pieces of information, or anything else that might be considered the author's "original creative work" rather than mere facts.

For example, a recipe is a process, and not copyrightable, but the words used to describe it are; see idea-expression divide and Publications International v. Meredith Corp. (1996). Therefore, a recipe can be rewritten with different wording and be published without infringing copyright. If an individual rewrote every recipe from a particular cookbook, they might be found to have infringed the author's copyright in the choice of recipes and their "coordination" and "presentation", even if they used different words, but the West decisions below suggest that this is unlikely unless there is some significant creativity carried over from the original presentation. A sufficiently novel, useful, and unique (i.e. non-obvious) recipe can be granted protection under patent law.

Feist proved most important in the area of copyright of legal case law publications. One might assume that the text of U.S. case law is in public domain, but Thomson West claimed a copyright as to the first-page citations and internal pinpoint page citations of its versions of court opinions (case law) found in its printed versions of the case law ("West's citation claims"). West also claimed a copyright in the text of its versions of the case law, which included parallel citations and typographical corrections ("West's text claims"). The text claim would have barred anyone from copying the text of a case from a West case law reporter, since the copied text would include West enhancements to which West claimed copyright.

In a 1986 pre-Feist case, West's citation copyright claim was affirmed by the U.S. Court of Appeals for the Eighth Circuit in a preliminary injunction case brought by West against Mead Data, owner of Lexis (West v. Mead), but in a case commenced in 1994 in the U.S. District Court for the Southern District of New York, the U.S. Court of Appeals for the Second Circuit found Feist to have undermined the reasoning in West v. Mead. West's citation claims were challenged in 1994 by legal publisher Matthew Bender & Company and by a small CD-ROM publisher HyperLaw, Inc. HyperLaw intervened, joining Matthew Bender in the citation challenge and separately challenging West's text copyright claims. In 1998, the Second Circuit found that West did not have a protectable copyright interest in its first-page citations or its internal pagination citations (Matthew Bender v. West, 158 F.3d 693 (2d Cir. 1998)). The Second Circuit thereby rejected a Minnesota district court's 1996 determination (Oasis Publishing Co. v. West Publishing Co., 924 F.Supp. 918, D. Minn.) that Feist does not change the outcome of West.

In the same case, but in separate decisions in which Matthew Bender was not involved, HyperLaw successfully challenged West's text claims. Judge John S. Martin ruled HyperLaw's favor against West in the May 1996 U.S. District Court decision Matthew Bender v. West, No. 94 Civ. 0589, 1997 WL 266972 (S.D.N.Y. May 19, 1997), aff'd, 158 F. 3d 674 (2nd Cir. 1998), cert. denied sub. nom. West v. Hyperlaw, 526 U.S. 1154 (1999). West lost to HyperLaw on appeal to the U.S. Court of Appeals for the Second Circuit and the U.S. Supreme Court denied certiorari.

After West v. Mead, Mead Data and Lexis were acquired by Reed Elsevier, a large English-Dutch based publisher. During Matthew Bender v. West, Reed Elsevier and Matthew Bender entered into a strategic relationship, culminating in Reed Elsevier's acquisition of Matthew Bender in 1998, just after the Second Circuit appeals were argued. Reed Elsevier was now on West's side and filed an amicus brief opposing HyperLaw and supporting West. Thus, though the name of the case might suggest that Matthew Bender challenged West on the text claim, by the middle of the case Matthew Bender was on West's side on the text issue. Reed Elsevier's support of West's claims to a copyright in text was consistent with the initiatives, discussed below, to sidestep Feist by implementing database protection, through legislation and treaties discussed below. Similarly, during the case, West was acquired by the Canadian-based international publisher the Thomson Corporation.

Another case covering this area is Assessment Technologies v. Wiredata (2003), in which the Seventh Circuit Court of Appeals ruled that a copyright holder in a compilation of public domain data cannot use that copyright to prevent others from using the underlying public domain data, but may only restrict the specific format of the compilation if that format is itself sufficiently creative. Assessment Technologies also held that it is a fair use of a copyrighted work to reverse engineer that work in order to gain access to uncopyrightable facts. Assessment Technologies also created new law, stating that it is a copyright misuse and an abuse of process to attempt to use a contract or license agreement based on one's copyright to protect uncopyrightable facts.

In the late 1990s, Congress attempted to pass laws to protect collections of data, but the measures failed. By contrast, the European Union has a sui generis (specific to that type of work) intellectual property protection for collections of data.

=== Other countries ===
The applicability of copyright to phone directories has come up in several other countries.

In Canada, the appeal-level case of Tele-Direct (Publications) Inc. v. American Business Information Inc. (1997) 76 C.P.R. (3d) 296 (F.C.A.) reached a similar result to Feist's. But the Supreme Court partially backed away from the originality doctrine in CCH Canadian Ltd. v. Law Society of Upper Canada. Under CCH Canadian, someone may assert protection in a database where the facts are themselves not copied from another source. For example, a person may assert protection in a collection of their own recipes, but may not assert protection in a database of facts about persons and their ancestry compiled from census records.

In Australia, the Federal Court decision Desktop Marketing Systems v Telstra followed the UK approach in Walter v Lane and ruled that copyright law did, in fact, follow the "sweat of the brow" doctrine. But Desktop v Telstra held, like CCH Canadian, that collections of facts must not be copied from other sources to be eligible for protection. In 2010, the Telstra decision was overturned by Justice Gordon in Telstra v Phone Directories, following the decision of the High Court in IceTV Pty Ltd v Nine Network Australia Pty Ltd.

In India, the Supreme Court case Eastern Book Company & Ors vs D.B. Modak & Anr (where the respondents had compiled CD-ROMs of Supreme Court rulings with text sourced from copyedited publications of them by Eastern Book Company, albeit with copyrightable headnotes and other original content removed) cited both Feist and CCH Canadian, establishing that a work needed to demonstrate labor or effort—but not only labor—in order to be an "original", copyrightable work. In this case, the Court held that the copy-edited text of public domain court documents did not "depict independent creation even a modicum of creativity." This ruling contrasted previous rulings such as Govindan v E.M. Gopalakrishna Kone and Burlington Home Shipping Pvt Ltd v Rajnish Chibber, which followed the British approach of skill and labor.

== Relation with treaties ==
Congress has been considering whether to implement a treaty negotiated at the World Trade Organization. Part of the Uruguay Round Agreement resulted in text that reads, in Part II, Section 1, Article 10:

Compilations of data or other material, whether in machine readable or other form, which by reason of the selection or arrangement of their contents constitute intellectual creations shall be protected as such. Such protection, which shall not extend to the data or material itself, shall be without prejudice to any copyright subsisting in the data or material itself.

The text mirrors that of Article 2(5) of the Berne Convention, which applies to "collections of literary or artistic works".

This treaty provision is broadly in line with the United States Copyright Act and the Act's case law, which protects compilations of data whose "selection and arrangement" is sufficiently original. See 17 U.S.C. § 101 ("compilation" as defined by the United States Copyright Act includes compilations of data). The standard for such originality is fairly low; for example, business listings have been found to meet this standard when deciding which companies should be listed and categorizing those companies required some kind of expert judgment. See Key Publ'ns, Inc. v. Chinatown Today Pub. Enters., 945 F.2d 509 (2d Cir. 1991) (applying Feist). As such, implementation of this treaty would not overrule Feist.

== See also ==
- Database and Collections of Information Misappropriation Act, a 2003 proposed bill to permit assertion of copyright ownership over factual data
- List of United States Supreme Court cases, volume 499
- Lists of United States Supreme Court cases
- Lists of United States Supreme Court cases by volume
- List of United States Supreme Court cases by the Rehnquist Court
- Idea–expression divide
- Threshold of originality
- Sui generis database right
