= Der Kurier =

West German newspaper (1945–1956)

Der Kurier was a newspaper in West Berlin during 1945–1966. Initially it was funded by the French occupying forces in Berlin. It was the first evening paper in Berlin and initially it was published in the tabloid style ("boulevard style"). It also published a weekly issue for the German prisoners of war in France.
