= Tvtv Services =

Electronic programme guide service provider

tvtv Services
- Traded as: tvtv
- Industry: Media
- Founded: 1999
- Defunct: 2023
- Headquarters: Nürnberg, Germany
- Owner: rtv media group GmbH (Bertelsmann)

tvtv Services, trading as tvtv, is a consumer-oriented pan-European electronic programme guide (EPG) service provider, owned by the arvato AG subsidiary rtv media group GmbH since January 2013. It was formerly broadcast on Freeview channel 304 (owned by YooMedia, timesharing with Absolute Radio) until 30 October 2008.

== History ==
In 1999, the first tvtv website was launched by Munich-based company Fast TV Server AG to enable remote programming. In 2001 Fast TV Server announced the first personal video recorder (PVR) with remote programming, and in 2002, the first TV set with EPG and PVR was launched.

In November 2003, Sony acquired Fast TV Server AG's EPG services, and tvtv Services became a branch of Sony UK Ltd, but continued to be run from Munich. This was followed by the launch of the first digital PVR in 2004 and the first customized web-EPG in 2005.

In September 2011, the ownership of tvtv was moved from Sony UK to the US Sony subsidiary Gracenote, under its German daughter company Gracenote GmbH. The purpose of the move was, according to the official press release, "to enable Gracenote to expand its portfolio of products and technology to Smart TV manufacturers, cable operators and broadcasters."

In November 2012, tvtv suspended the offer for new subscriptions to their online services, and announced that existing subscriptions would not be extended.

In January 2013, tvtv was moved from Gracenote GmbH to the arvato AG subsidiary rtv media group GmbH. With this transfer the rtv media group expands its portfolio to further digital products and is constantly on a growth course with positioning its products as leading platforms for program navigation and advertising media for online and cross-media campaigns.

In 2023, Bertelsmann decided to close down its RTV Media Group GmbH subsidiary and with it all offline, online and print operations.

== Service ==
tvtv enables users to personalize their TV listings, receive personalized and collaborative recommendations, recommend programs to their friends and remotely control their recording lists via the World Wide Web or a mobile phone. Tvtv provides EPG technology and metadata to various set-top boxes and websites of large cable operators, digital TV sets, digital video recorders, TV tuner sticks, mobile devices and web portals. In order to benefit from the premium services like remote recording, users need to have a compatible device and register for the service. The delivery of metadata for set-top boxes, TV tuner sticks and hardware in general as well as the online recording function was ceased on February 28, 2013. EPG data delivery for select services continued until December 2017. The tvtv websites for Germany, Austria and Switzerland were operated by rtv media group until December 2023.
