= Originality =

Aspect of created or invented works being new or novel

Originality is the aspect of created or invented works that distinguish them from reproductions, clones, forgeries, or substantially derivative works. The modern idea of originality is according to some scholars tied to Romanticism, by a notion that is often called romantic originality. The validity of "originality" as an operational concept has been questioned. For example, there is no clear boundary between "derivative" and "inspired by" or "in the tradition of."

The concept of originality is both culturally and historically contingent. For example, unattributed reiteration of a published text in one culture might be considered plagiarism but in another culture might be regarded as a convention of veneration. At the time of Shakespeare, it was more common to appreciate the similarity with an admired classical work, and Shakespeare himself avoided "unnecessary invention". It wasn't until the start of the 18th century that the concept of originality became an ideal in Western culture.

Today, originality is seen as something that is still largely understood as a sign of uniqueness and has its own sort of independence. It severs itself from having any form of imitation from anything related to the past.

== Originality in law ==
In law, originality has become an important legal concept with respect to intellectual property, where creativity and invention have manifest as protectable or copyrightable works. In the Berne Convention for the Protection of Literary and Artistic Works (1886) that has been adapted by 181 countries and city-states, "original work" gives a creator exclusive rights; protection for creative works are automatically in force upon their creation without being asserted or declared.

In the patent law of the United States, only original inventions can be subject to protection. In addition to being original, inventions submitted for a patent must also be useful and nonobvious.

In United States copyright law copyrights protect only original works of authorship, a property which has been historically and legally linked to a concept of "creativity". A work must pass a threshold of originality in order to be copyrightable. In other countries protection of a work often is connected to similar conditions.

In United Kingdom intellectual property law, a derived work can demonstrate originality, and must do so if it is to respect copyright.

== Originality under the United States copyright law ==
In the copyright law of the United States, more specifically under 17 U.S.C 102, the work that is sought to be protected must satisfy the threshold of originality. Though most of the countries require certain degree of originality in the work sought to be protected, such requirement does not stem from either the Berne Convention or the TRIPS Agreement. Therefore, there is no uniformity in the standard for originality. In the United States, originality necessitates bare minimum degree of creativity and independent creation. The Supreme Court of the United States in the case of Feist Publications v. Rural Telephone Service Co. held that the work must be independently created and must possess minimum degree of creativity. This interpretation requires an extremely low level of creativity and in the words of the court, "must possess some creative spark no matter how crude, humble or obvious it might be." The court also took the opportunity to reject the previously judicially-established and followed the sweat of the brow doctrine. According to the said doctrine, labour and hard-work alone could suffice to establish originality. After the doctrine was rejected by the Supreme Court in 1991, in the Bridgeman Art Library v. Corel Corp case, the court held that the copies of public domain photographs could not be copyrighted since they lacked originality and while such reproductions may have involved skill and labour, no protection could be granted to them, on account of lack of originality.

While the current legal requirements of originality viz. minimum level of creativity and independent labour can be easily assessed and applied in case of literary works, the courts are required to undertake a deeper legal and factual inquiry in photographic works. The United States District Court for Southern District of New York in Mannion v. Coors Brewing Company considered originality in terms of timing, subject and rendition, and held that the nature and extent of the copyright would be independent in the three aspects. The requirement for originality was incorporated in the statute only in the Copyright Act, 1976 and over the course of time, the courts have evolved various metrics to apply the test. Unlike, Patents, novelty is not required for a work to be considered as original. The United States Court of Appeals for the Second Circuit in Sheldon (1936) had clarified that sometimes it is relevant for other purposes. Therefore, if the work created by you is identical to a pre-existing work but you are unaware of the latter's existence, you may still enjoy copyright protection for your work.

Apart from novelty, the work is not required to be made with an intent to be original. What is considered is only that it is actually an independent creation in effect. In 1951, the court in Alfred Bell Co. v. Catalda Arts held that the question as to whether there was intent to be original was not to be considered. The Supreme Court of the United States has also clarified that it is not necessary for the work to be artistic to qualify as original. Furthermore, in the landmark ruling, the court observed that it would be a dangerous undertaking for persons trained only to the law to constitute themselves final judges of the worth of pictorial illustrations, outside of the narrowest and most obvious limits. At the one extreme, some works of genius would be sure to miss appreciation. Their very novelty would make them repulsive until the public had learned the new language in which their author spoke. It may be more than doubted, for instance, whether the etchings of Goya or the paintings of Monet would have been sure of protection when seen for the first time. At the other end, copyright would be denied to pictures which appealed to a public less educated than the judge. This observation was an embodiment of the principle of artistic or aesthetic neutrality which seeks to eliminate the inherent subjectivity involved in the judges deciding whether the work is artistic, and hence, the question as to whether it warrants protection. The principle finds four broad justifications- (i) lack of expertise in the judges (ii) fear of elitism (iii) fear of paternalism (also called parentalism) (iv) lack of consensus on what constitutes art. However, scholars note that the principle of aesthetic neutrality is often violated as the adjudicators end up favouring creators of what they believe is deserving of copyright grant.

In the United States, the work is not required to be non-commercial in nature for copyright protection and unlike the US trademark law, the work need to be necessarily lawful. Therefore, works created for commercial purposes, such as advertisements can also be granted a copyright.

== Originality under the Indian Copyright law ==
Section 13(1)(a) of the Indian Copyright Act, 1957 mentions 'originality' as a requirement for copyright protection to literary, dramatic, musical and artistic works. Courts have interpreted this requirement of 'originality' in different ways. This has given rise to various doctrines/tests that can be helpful in determining whether a work meets the threshold of originality. The most prominent case with respect to 'originality' under the Indian Copyright Law is the Eastern Book Company v DCB Modak. This judgment gave rise to two doctrines i.e. modicum of creativity and the skill and judgment test. This remains the accepted and current position of law in India as of now. However, prior to this, the Indian Courts used to follow the Sweat of the Brow approach.

=== "Sweat of the brow" doctrine ===
This theory bases the grant of copyright protection on the effort and labour that an author puts into their work as opposed to the creativity involved. Locke's theory of labour as property has often been extended to give jurisprudential basis to this theory of copyright law. In the case of V. Govindan v E.M. Gopalakrishna Kone, it was held that compilations of information would meet the threshold of 'originality' under the Indian Copyright Act since it involves some level of 'skill, labour and brain'. A similar line of reasoning was adopted in the case of Burlington Home Shipping Pvt Ltd v Rajnish Chibber where a database was held to be original enough to be protected by copyright under Indian law. However, like in other jurisdictions, this theory was discarded by the Indian Courts also and the focus was shifted to the creativity involved in any work.

=== EBC Modak case (modicum of creativity and skill and judgment test) ===
The EBC Modak case is the Indian counterpart of the Feist Publications case in terms of the test it laid down. It concerned the copyrightability of Supreme Court judgments that were copy-edited and published by Eastern Book Company. These judgments were published along with 'headnotes' that were written by the Company itself. While explicitly discarding the Sweat of the Brow theory, the Court held that simply copy editing would not meet the threshold of originality under copyright law since it would only demonstrate an "amount of skill, labour and capital put in the inputs of the copy-edited judgments and the original or innovative thoughts for the creativity would be completely excluded.". Thus, it introduced the requirement of 'creativity' under originality. With respect to the level of creativity involved, the court adopted the 'minimal degree of creativity' approach. Following this standard, the headnotes that did not copy from the judgment verbatim were held to be copyrightable.

Finally, the Court also gave way to the 'Skill and Judgment Test' which is more or less a compromise between the sweat of the brow theory and the modicum of creativity test. While relying on the CCH Canadian Case, the Court essentially held that a work would meet the originality standard as long as there is labour or effort involved but not only labour. It must involve some level of skill and judgment as well. However, this approach mirrors the Sweat of the Brow theory more closely and is therefore a difficult theory to defend. Further, the Court held the division of a judgment into paragraphs and numbering them was enough to meet this standard of 'Skill and Judgment'. Whether this is the correct interpretation of the test as given in the CCH Canadian Case remains debatable.

== Originality in science ==
Scientific literature considered as primary must contain original research, and even review articles contain original analysis or interpretation.

== Originality in ideas and creative works ==
The concept of originality being considered as an important trait in the quality of art was widely debated starting from the early eighteenth century and continuing on to the early twentieth century. Many scholars throughout the years have discussed exactly what originality means in the context of how it should be used in order to judge poetry, visual art, and music.

Since the first half of the twentieth century, many researchers have closely studied the concept. They considered what originality has meant in the past and how the ideas have developed in more recent times. They have made three main arguments about originality. First, they have argued that the emergence of the concept of originality has marked a shift away from the traditional ideas of how art should imitate past works. Secondly, they have suggested that the idea of originality has developed before or during the Romantic period, having also played a major role in the movement. Lastly, researchers have also argued that originality has become an ideal that has strongly influenced many of the existing art theories in the past.

Despite the common assumption, an original idea is not always one not thought up by another person beforehand. Sometimes, two or more people can come up with the same idea independently. Originality is usually associated with characteristics such as being imaginative, innovative, and creative.

The evaluation of originality depends not only on the creative work itself, but also on the temporal context, the zeitgeist. In a study of the musical originality of 15,618 classical music themes, the importance of objective characteristics and the zeitgeist for popularity was examined. Both the musical originality of a theme relative to its contemporary works (the zeitgeist), as well as its "absolute" originality influenced in similar magnitude the popularity of a theme. Similarly, objective features and temporal context both influenced the evaluation of linguistic originality.

== Originality in audio/recording ==
An original painting, photographic negative, analog audio, or video recording, will contain qualities that can be difficult, or under current technology may be impossible to copy in its full integrity. That can also apply for any other artifact.

That is why it is often necessary to preserve the original, in order to preserve its original integrity. The copy is made to preserve the original recording by saving the original from degenerating as it is being played, rather than to replace the original.

== See also ==
- Copyright protection of photographs in Switzerland - describes the criteria for the originality of photographs in Swiss law
- Creativity
- Derivative work
- Feist v. Rural and Bridgeman Art Library v. Corel Corp. (US)
- In fiction narratology, an original is the first-published installment of a series of works, thus having sequels, prequels, etc.
- Ship of Theseus
- Synonyms: archetype, prototype (the first draft of an original work), model, template, and pastiche (an imitation of an archetype or prototype in order to pay homage to the original creator)
- Sweat of the brow
