= Genius Sports =

Sports data and technology company

- Type: Public
- Traded as: NYSE: GENI
- Industry: Sports data
- Predecessor: Betgenius; Second Spectrum; SportingPulse International Genius Sports Group
- Founded: 2016; 10 years ago
- Headquarters: New York, NY, USA
- Key people: Mark Locke (CEO) Jack Davison (CCO) Steven Burton (COO)
- Number of employees: 1,500
- Website: geniussports.com

Genius Sports is a sports data and technology company that provides data management, video streaming and integrity services to sports leagues, bookmakers and media companies.

In April 2021, Genius Sports completed a business combination agreement with a special purpose acquisition company dMY Technology Group, Inc. II to list on the New York Stock Exchange.

== History ==
Genius Sports was formed in 2016 following a merger between Betgenius, a technology and data supplier to the betting industry, and SportingPulse International, a sports data and software business.

In 2017, Genius Sports acquired Data Project, a volleyball technology provider. In September, the PGA Tour launched a new Integrity Program to "maintain integrity and prevent mitigate betting-related corruption in PGA Tour competitions". Genius Sports was selected to support the PGA Tour through bet monitoring and educational services.

In May 2018, the National Collegiate Athletic Association (NCAA) announced a new statistics initiative for its 1,100 Members alongside Genius Sports. The deal aimed to modernise how NCAA Schools and Conferences harness game statistics to engage fans, drive performance levels and manage their operations. In July 2018, Genius Sports Group was acquired by Apax Partners. In November, Football DataCo, the rights holder of all the professional football leagues in England and Scotland, announced its new integrity strategy alongside Genius Sports and Perform Group. This agreement marked the first time two technology companies had combined to help protect a sport against match-fixing.

In May 2019, Genius Sports struck a deal with the NASCAR stock-car racing association to become the exclusive provider of NASCAR data to licensed sportsbooks around the world. Also in May, Genius Sports announced a deal with Football DataCo to be the official supplier of live data to the global sports betting industry for the Premier League, English Football League and Scottish Professional Football League, replacing the leagues’ previous supplier, Perform Group, which instead agreed to be acquired by investment firm Vista Equity Partners. The multi-year deal will commence with the start of the leagues’ 2019/20 seasons. In July, FIBA, the world governing body of basketball, announced an extension of its 15-year partnership with Genius Sports, providing statistics collection, distribution and competition management to its member leagues and federations. In July and August, Genius Sports partnered with the German Football Association and Superliga Argentina to help protect their competitions from match-fixing and betting-related corruption. In October, Genius Sports announced the acquisition of Oppia Performance, an automated video production and streaming company.

In April 2021, Genius Sports partnered with the National Football League to act as distributor of live NFL data and statistics to bookmakers and media companies. This partnership included the rights to distribute NFL streams and represent its sports betting advertising inventory.

In May 2021, Genius Sports acquired Second Spectrum, a company providing data tracking and analytics to sports leagues, teams and broadcasters. On September 7, 2021, Genius sports announced a partnership with WynnBET to provide official data feeds, player acquisition and fan engagement insight after the approval of WynnBET to become an Official Sportsbook operator of the NGL for the 2021 season.

In December 2021, the Canadian Football League announced that it is partnering with Genius Sports via new arm called CFL Ventures that will share commercial revenue.

In July 2023, Genius Sports extended its partnership with the National Football League to continue distributing the league's play-by-play data and media and sports betting operators through the 2027 season. In September 2023, Genius Sports launched BetVision, a new sportsbook streaming service on the NFL, used by sportsbooks including Caesars, Fanatics, BetRivers and FanDuel.

== Products and services ==
Genius Sports provides software to sports leagues and federations. This technology enables sports to capture, manage and distribute their data and statistics and is used by sports leagues globally. Sports, in turn, grant Genius Sports the rights to commercialise their data and video content with sportsbooks, casinos and media companies. Genius Sports also provides sports leagues with tracking technology, capturing detailed positional data on players and the ball to create insights and analysis for partners including the WNBA.

Genius Sports' betting partners include over 300 sportsbook brands such as FanDuel, Skybet and Bet365. Genius Sports provides sportsbooks with live data, odds and streams from thousands of over 240,000 live sports events per year.

Genius Sports works with sports broadcasters to deliver alternate broadcasts that use data and statistics. This includes Prime Vision with Next Gen Stats on Prime Video.

In February 2026, Genius Sports announced a $1.2bn acquisition of Legend, the company behind brands like Casino.org and Covers.com. Share prices dropped 23% immediately after the announcement, with investors seemingly nervous over the Legend price tag.
