= Australian Digital Alliance =

Australian trade association

- Company type: Public Interest
- Industry: Copyright Advocacy
- Founded: 1998; 28 years ago
- Headquarters: Canberra, Australia
- Operating income: Member Contributions
- Website: www.digital.org.au

The Australian Digital Alliance (ADA) is an Australian non-profit coalition of public and private sector interests, formed to promote balanced copyright law by providing a voice for the public interest perspective in debates about copyright change and reform. The ADA engages with government through submissions, lobbying, and media activities.

== IceTV Pty Ltd v Nine Network Australia Pty Ltd (2009) ==
The Nine Network sued IceTV for copyright infringement after IceTV used parts of Nine Network's programme schedules for its electronic program guide. The case raised questions about the threshold of the originality requirement for copyright, and the nature of the protection for compilations (collections of facts) in Australia.

The ADA was granted leave by the High Court of Australia to intervene as a friend of the court. The ADA's submissions outlined the importance of public interest considerations and the implications that this case could have on copyright users.

The High Court found in favour of IceTV, with the joint judgment of Gummow, Hayne and Heydon making reference to the ADA's submissions.
