= Antiquesportfolio.com plc v Rodney Fitch & Co Ltd =

Antiquesportfolio.com plc v Rodney Fitch & Co Ltd ([2001] FSR 345) is a case in British copyright law that dealt in implied contractual obligations to avoid violating copyright, and on the copyright status of photographs.

== Action ==
Plaintiff Antiquesportfolio.com wished to set up an internet business to sell antiques. It had contracted with defendant Rodney Fitch to create its website, logos, business cards, and advertising literature. After discovering Fitch copied several photographs from Miller's Antiques & Encyclopaedia, an encyclopaedia of antiques, it sued, alleging a breach of the implied contractual term that the website supplied respects other parties' copyrights. It sought repayment of all monies paid, and moved for summary judgement, while Fitch counterclaimed for all monies owed.

== Judgement ==
The court had to address four issues:

1. Whether an implied term existed,
2. Whether the images in the encyclopaedia were copyrightable,
3. Whether copyright had been infringed, and
4. Which party (if any) should pay the other

Lord Justice Neuberger partly relied upon Lister v Romford Ice and Cold Storage Company to find the implied contractual term that the goods supplied must be fit for the purpose for which they were commissioned. This comprised a duty of reasonable care on the part of Fitch to not knowingly copy material from a third party. He further found photographs of three-dimensional objects potentially copyrightable.
