= Sweat of the brow =

Copyright law doctrine

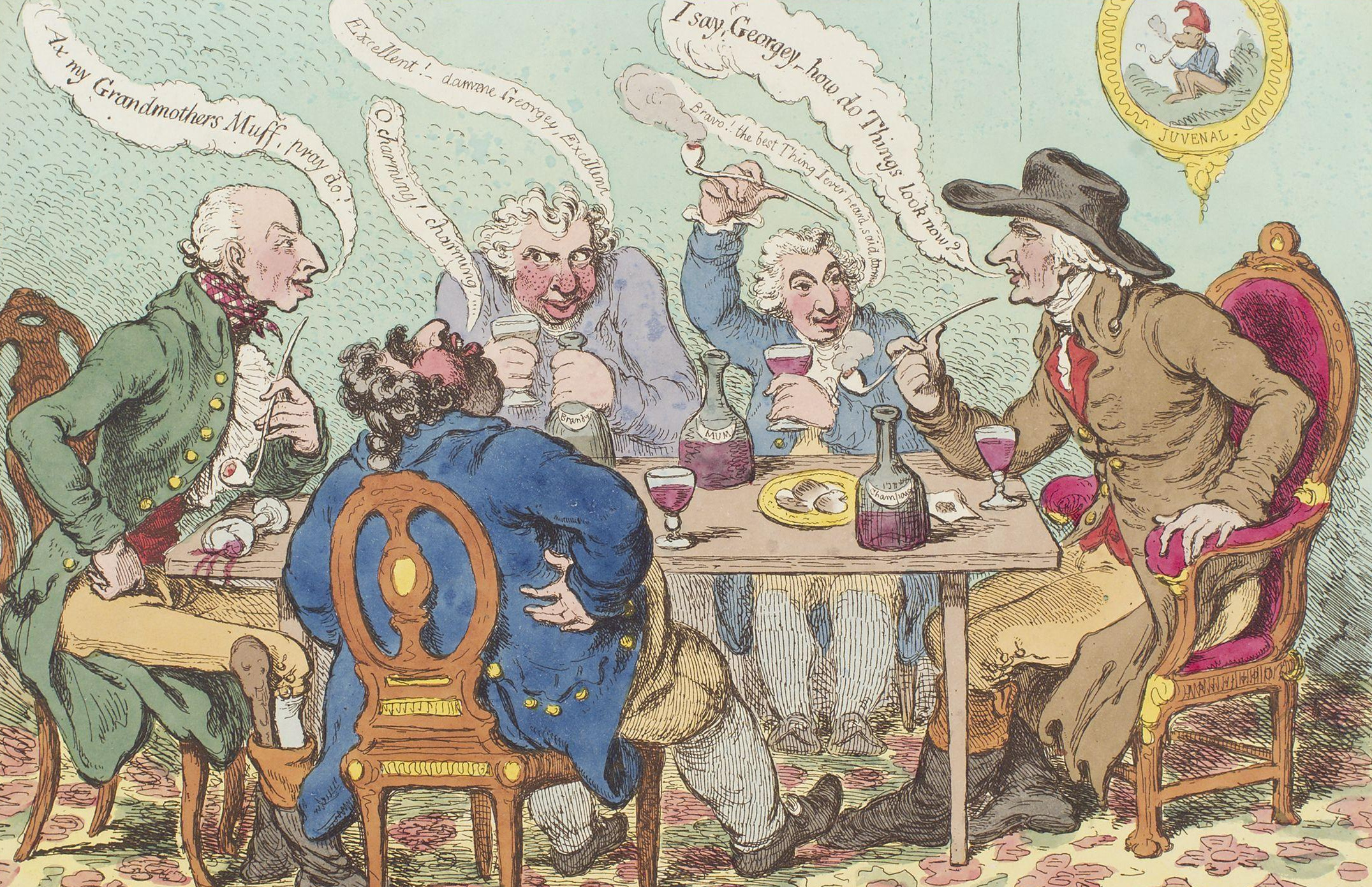
As James Gillray, the artist of this 1797 etching, died in 1815, his works are in the public domain throughout the world. However, under the "sweat of the brow" doctrine, new copyright claims could be made over mechanical reproductions of the etching, due to the skill and labour involved in the reproduction.

Sweat of the brow is a copyright law doctrine. According to this doctrine, an author gains rights through simple diligence during the creation of a work, such as a database, or a directory. Substantial creativity or "originality" is not required.

Under a "sweat of the brow" doctrine, the creator of a work, even if it is completely unoriginal, is entitled to have that effort and expense protected; no one else may use such a work without permission, but must instead recreate the work by independent research or effort. The classic example is a telephone directory. In a "sweat of the brow" jurisdiction, such a directory may not be copied, but instead a competitor must independently collect the information to issue a competing directory. The same rule generally applies to databases and lists of facts.

According to the Databases Directive 96/9/EC, member states of the EU are obliged to confer protection known as the database right on non-original databases, that is on those that embody no creativity, but are a consequence of substantial investment (financial, labour etc.). It is an infringement when a person, without consent, extracts or re-uses all or a substantial part of the contents of the database.

== Etymology ==
In a traditional English idiom, the sweat of one's brow refers to the effort expended in labour, and the value created thereby. The phrase is famously used in English translations of Genesis 3:19. The law doctrine takes its name from this idiom.

== By territory ==
=== United States ===
The United States rejected this doctrine in the 1991 United States Supreme Court case Feist Publications v. Rural Telephone Service; until then it had been upheld in a number of US copyright cases.

Under the Feist ruling in the US, mere collections of facts are considered unoriginal and thus not protected by copyright, no matter how much work went into collating them. The arrangement and presentation of a collection may be original, but not if it is "simple and obvious" such as a list in alphabetical or chronological order.

=== United Kingdom ===
==== Old approach ====
An early example of the "sweat of the brow" doctrine in UK law was the leading case of Walter v Lane (1900) in which reporters took down shorthand notes of a series of speeches given by the Earl of Rosebery, and transcribed them, adding punctuation, corrections and revisions. These were then published as verbatim reports of the speeches in The Times newspaper. The defendant, John Lane, reproduced the speeches in a book, relying heavily without permission on The Times publications. The question for the court was whether the reporters could be considered "authors" of the published versions under the terms of the Copyright Act 1842. The House of Lords held that the reporters were indeed "authors", and hence entitled to copyright, on the basis of the skill, effort and time involved in preparing the text for publication.

At the time Walter v Lane was decided, UK copyright law contained no explicit notion of "originality". The subsequent Copyright Act 1911 added for the first time a specific statutory requirement that, for copyright to subsist in a work, that work must be "original". However, for well over a hundred years UK courts did not adopt a literal reading of that requirement, instead holding that a significant expenditure of skill and labour in the creation of a new work was sufficient.

In University of London Press Ltd v University Tutorial Press Ltd (1916), the question arose as to whether certain mathematics exam papers, consisting of conventional problems presented in a conventional manner, were original literary works in which copyright would subsist. The court held that originality did not mean that the work must be an expression of individual thought, and the fact that the authors drew on a body of knowledge common to mathematicians did not compromise originality. The requirement of originality, it was held, did not require that expression be in an original or novel form. It did, however, require that the work not be copied from another work. It must originate from the author. Consequently, even though there was no creative input, the skill, labour, and judgement of the authors was sufficient to make the papers original literary works.

In Cummins v Bond (1927), a psychic in a trance claimed to have written down what spirits told her, through a process of automatic writing. In court, she accepted that she was not the creative author of the writing. Nonetheless, the court held that she had exercised sufficient labour and skill in translating and transcribing what the spirits told her, so she had a copyright in the resulting literary work.

==== New (European) approach ====
The 'skill and labour' approach was challenged in 2012 when a case was taken to the European Court of Justice in which Football DataCo claimed copyright infringement over web sites which were reproducing match schedules from several major football leagues. Football DataCo asserted that these schedules were copyrighted works due to the skill and labour involved in their preparation, and that the company was given exclusive rights to license their reproduction. Based on its interpretation of UK law, the court rejected the notion that skill and labour was enough to grant protection to a work, since "unless the procedures for creating the lists concerned as described by the national court are supplemented by elements reflecting originality in the selection or arrangement of the data contained in those lists, they do not suffice for those lists to be protected by the copyright laid down in the directive".

This European approach has prevailed over the old 'skill and labour' test. In a copyright notice on "digital images, photographs and the internet" last updated in November 2015, the UK Intellectual Property Office stated that digital reproductions of public domain images are not protected by copyright, arguing that "according to the Court of Justice of the European Union which has effect in UK law, copyright can only subsist in subject matter that is original in the sense that it is the author's own 'intellectual creation'. Given this criterion, it seems unlikely that what is merely a retouched, digitised image of an older work can be considered as 'original'." A November 2023 Appeal Court judgement (THJ v. Sheridan, 2023) by Lord Justice Arnold clarified that, in the UK, no new copyright is created in making a photographic reproduction of a two-dimensional public domain artwork.

=== Germany ===
Prior to 2021, German law granted ancillary copyrights (Leistungsschutzrecht) due to the effort involved in the production or exploitation of creative works. In 2016, a regional court in Berlin ruled that digitized versions of public domain paintings were entitled to new copyrights due to the effort and expertise necessary to create the reproductions. The case was appealed. In 2018 a court upheld the decision that the digitized public domain paintings were entitled to new copyrights. In 2021, Germany implemented Article 14 of the Directive on Copyright in the Digital Single Market. Germany's implementation law specified that reproductions of visual works in the public domain are not protected by copyright or related rights.

=== European Union ===
In 2019, the European Union adopted the Directive on Copyright in the Digital Single Market. Article 14 of the directive states that reproductions of works of visual art that are in the public domain cannot be subject to copyright or related rights, unless the reproduction is an original creative work.

=== Israel ===
Israeli law requires that a work exhibit some degree of originality in order to be copyrightable. In other words, Israeli law does not subscribe to the "sweat of the brow" doctrine. However, the amount of originality required is minimal, and the transliteration or interpretation of an artifact is covered by copyright.

== See also ==
- Copyfraud
- Fair use (complement to avoid abuses)
- Lockean Classical liberalism
- Labour theory of value
- Database right
- Sweat equity
- Threshold of originality
