= IceTV =

Australian company

IceTV Pty Ltd
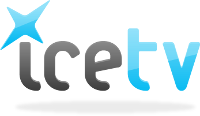
- Type: EPG (Electronic Program Guide) Provider
- Founded: 2005
- Headquarters: Sydney, Australia
- Website: www.icetv.com.au

IceTV is an Australian company providing an independently curated Electronic Program Guide (EPG) for digital free-to-air television. It also produces Smart Recording Software.

IceTV offers a TiVo-like service that provides series recording, keyword recording and advanced searching for compatible devices. It is a premium, subscription based service, although almost all devices that are IceTV-enabled come with free trial memberships.

== History ==
Founded in 2005, IceTV has been an EPG provider for PVR/DVR manufacturers such as Topfield, Humax and Beyonwiz, and software such as EyeTV and Windows Media Center.

In April 2009, IceTV won IceTV Pty Ltd v Nine Network Australia Pty Ltd, a three-year-long Intellectual property case against the Australian Nine Network. Nine claimed IceTV was infringing copyright by displaying the station's shows in its electronic program guide (EPG). This case is said to be a landmark in Australian intellectual property law.

IceTV was placed into voluntary administration on 6 October 2015.

It was revived at the 11th hour, but customers who had prepaid for units lost their units, as they were left in a warehouse. Purchases made by credit card were refunded by the CC provider.

The business of IceTV Pty Ltd was purchased from the Administrator/Liquidator on 6 January 2016 and TV TV Australia Pty Limited, a company owned by IceTV founder Colin O'Brien, now trades using the name IceTV.

== Products ==
=== EPG ===
IceTV delivers a curated, 7 day electronic program guide (EPG) for Australian free-to-air TV, which is provided as a feed to IceTV’s compatible recording devices or to EPG aggregators for on-sale to their customers. The guide auditing system passes through a two-stage verification process. The first check is done through IceTV’s content engine software, and their dedicated content management team conducts the second stage audit. As TV programming changes occur throughout the day, updates occur in real-time to IceTV’s servers, providing users with a reliable and accurate service.

=== Smart Recording ===
Smart Recording is an online facility, giving IceTV's customers control over series recording, keyword recording, advanced searching etc. IceTV also has an iPhone App, Android app and mobile site enabling remote recordings from iPhones, iPads, and Android phones and tablets onto a compatible PVR/DVR, Smart TV, Windows Media Centre, Elgato EyeTV for Mac and Network Attached Storage (NAS).
