= Walter v Lane =

UK copyright case of 1900

- Court: House of Lords
- Full case name: Walter and another (on behalf of themselves and all other the proprietors of the business of publishing and carrying on The Times Newspaper) and Lane
- Decided: 6 August 1900
- Citation: [1900] AC 539, 69 LJ Ch 699, 49 WR 95, 83 LT 289, 16 TLR 551, [1900-03] All ER Rep Ext 1666

Case history
- Prior action: Walter v Lane [1899] 2 Ch 749
- Appealed from: Court of Appeal of England and Wales

Court membership
- Judges sitting: Lord Chancellor Earl of Halsbury; Lord Davey; Lord James of Hereford; Lord Brampton; Lord Robertson

Keywords
- Copyright; Newspaper; Authors

Walter v Lane [1900] AC 539, was a judgement of the House of Lords on the question of authorship under the Copyright Act 1842. It has come to be recognised as a seminal case on the notion of originality in copyright law and has been upheld as an early example of the sweat of the brow doctrine.

== Facts ==
Reporters from The Times newspaper took down shorthand notes of a series of speeches given by the Earl of Rosebery, a prominent politician, and later transcribed them, adding punctuation, corrections and revisions to reproduce verbatim the speeches. These were then published in The Times, under the proprietorship of Arthur Fraser Walter.

The respondent in the case, John Lane, published a book called Appreciations and Addresses, Delivered by Lord Rosebery including these speeches, taken substantially from the reports of those speeches in The Times. The question for the court was whether the reporters of the speech could be considered "authors" under the terms of the Copyright Act.

== Reasoning ==
The House of Lords, by a 4-1 majority, reversed the decision of the Court of Appeal. The court held that the reporters were authors under the Copyright Act 1842. The effort, skill and time that spent was sufficient to make them original.

For Lord Brampton, it was crucial that the "preparation [of the reports] involved considerable intellectual skill and brain labour beyond the mere mechanical operation of writing".

Lord Robertson, dissenting, compared the reporters to phonographs and found that there was no authorship even though there was much skill required.

== Significance ==
Although the Copyright Act 1842 did not contain a notion of "originality" (the word original did not appear until the enactment of the Copyright Act 1911), the decision in Walter v Lane would later be treated as authority for the notion of "originality" within English copyright law.

== See also ==
- Reynolds v Times Newspapers Ltd: court case involving The Times
