= Database right =

Legal protection for computer datasets

A database right is a sui generis property right, comparable to but distinct from copyright, that exists to recognise the investment that is made in compiling a database, even when this does not involve the "creative" aspect that is reflected by copyright. Such rights are often referred to in the plural: database rights.

The TRIPS Agreement requires that copyright protection extends to databases and other compilations if they constitute intellectual creation by virtue of the selection or arrangement of their contents, even if some or all of the contents do not themselves constitute materials protected by copyright. Many countries act in accordance with this requirement, as databases are protected by copyright if this condition is met, and there is no separate intellectual property right protecting databases (or any aspects of them) that do not meet the conditions for copyright protection. The database right extends protection over databases which does not depend on the condition required for copyright protection, and is recognised only in a small number of jurisdictions, most notably the European Union.

== Countries that recognise database rights ==
=== European Union ===
In European Union law, database rights are specifically coded (i.e. sui generis) laws on the copying and dissemination of information in computer databases. These rights were first introduced in 1996. On 11 March 1996 the Council of the European Union passed Directive 96/9/EC of 11 March 1996 on the legal protection of databases, giving specific and separate legal rights (and limitations) to certain computer records. The law calls these database rights. Rights afforded to manual records under EU database rights laws are similar in format, but not identical, to those afforded artistic works.

Database rights last for 15 years. Each time a database is substantially modified, however, a new set of rights are created for that database. An owner has the right to object to the copying of substantial parts of their database, even if data is extracted and reconstructed piecemeal. Database rights under the EU are created automatically, vested in the employers of creators (when the action of creation was part of employment), and do not have to be registered to have effect.

Database rights are independent of copyright: The arrangement, selection, and presentation of the data may be protected by copyright, while the database as a whole can be protected by database right.

=== United Kingdom ===
On 1 January 1998, The Copyright and Rights in Databases Regulations 1997 came into force, which implemented the EU Database Directive. These regulations made a number of amendments to the Copyright, Designs and Patents Act 1988 with respect to databases, a database being defined as

"a collection of independent works, data or other materials—

(a) are arranged in a systematic or methodical way, and
(b) are individually accessible by electronic or other means"

The regulations extend existing copyright law to databases, to the extent that they constitute "the author's own intellectual creation".

In addition, regulations 13 and 14 create a database right. Database rights automatically subsist if there has been a "substantial investment in obtaining, verifying or presenting the contents" of the database.

Such rights remain in force under regulation 17(2) until the end of the 15th calendar year from the date on which the database was first made available to the public. During that period, database right will be infringed by any person who, without consent, "extracts or re-uses all or a substantial part of the contents of the database", whether all at once or by repeated extractions of "insubstantial" parts.

On the other hand, any lawful user of the database has a right under regulation 19(1) "to extract or re-use insubstantial parts of the data for any purpose", and that right cannot be restricted by the database owner (regulation 19(2)). The term "substantial" is defined to mean "substantial in terms of quantity or quality or a combination of both".

Under the Brexit withdrawal agreement, database rights that existed before 1 January 2021 retain reciprocal recognition between the UK and EEA for their original duration, while those created on or after that date are only protected within the creator's jurisdiction - either the EEA or the UK.

=== Russia ===
In article 1260 of the Civil Code of Russia, a database is a collection of independent materials presented in an objective form (articles, accounts, legal texts, judicial decisions, and other similar materials), which are systematically arranged in a way that these materials can be found and processed by a computer. A database need not be registered to enjoy legal protection, but the Civil Code of Russia provides for the registration of rights, which is useful if the claims are disputed in court.

Russia generally follows the EU model, there are some differences.

=== Norway ===
In Norway's Intellectual Property Act (Act No. 40 of June 15, 2018, on Copyright for Intellectual Property, etc.), the EU's database directive (databasedirektivet) is expressly incorporated. Accordingly, even though Norway is not technically an EU member state, EU database law still applies.

== Countries that do not recognise database rights ==
=== United States ===
Uncreative collections of facts are outside of Congressional authority under the Copyright Clause (Article I, § 8, cl. 8) of the United States Constitution, therefore no database right exists in the United States. Originality is the sine qua non of copyright in the United States (see Feist Publications v. Rural Telephone Service). This has not stopped database owners lobbying for the introduction of such a right, but so far bills to introduce it in the US have been prevented by the successful lobbying of research libraries, consumer groups and firms who benefit from the free use of factual information.

=== Brazil ===
In Brazil, Federal Law No. 9610 of 1998 (the Law of the authorial rights) confers database owners exclusive rights specifically for copying, distribution and translation of databases. The same law also states that this right is contingent upon the database being the result of an intellectual creation, which may be deemed so based on "the selection, organization, or disposition of its content". Therefore, consistent with international law and the position in many jurisdictions, legislation in Brazil may or may not offer copyright protection to databases, depending on how the database was developed. This right applies to the unique and creative structure of the database itself and not to its contents.

=== Canada ===
As with many other jurisdictions, "[t]here is no separate (or sui generis) statutory protection for databases in Canada."

=== Japan ===
In Japan, whether a database can be protected by copyright depend on whether the data collected meet threshold of protection in copyright law. For example, in year 2000, Tokyo District Court ruled that the original classification system of industries applied by database owner onto telephone number database is copyright protected. In year 2002, Tokyo District Court ruled the structure of a database of new built residential unit price and characteristics to be protected by copyright because of the way it selects the data and organize into system. On the other hand, in year 2001, Tokyo District Court ruled that even when the database itself do not have sufficient creativity applied to make it protected by copyright, if one use the database created by database owner with efforts to compete against the database owner, it could still be considered an illegal behavior as it violated fair and free competition in the market. However, the use of such illegal behavior term to restrict use of non-copyright-protected works have reduced following a 2011 ruling by Intellectual Property High Court that require exceptional circumstances for its application, which the test have been applied in subsequent rulings.

== See also ==
- Copyright
- meta:Wikilegal/Database Rights
- Open Database License
- Sweat of the brow
