= Football DataCo =

British company in the football industry

Football DataCo Ltd
- Type: Limited company
- Industry: Association football Media
- Founded: London, UK (2001)
- Headquarters: London, UK
- Area served: Worldwide
- Services: Licensing of intellectual property
- Owner: Premier League; English Football League
- Website: www.football-dataco.com

Football DataCo is a British company in the football industry that grants licences to third parties (such as newspapers) allowing them to reproduce certain intellectual property (such as fixture lists and statistics) owned by the UK's three professional football leagues: the Premier League, The Football League and the Scottish Professional Football League.

Many of Football DataCo's activities are contracted out to the Press Association (PA). Thus, PA Sport handles applications for and distributes fixture lists and produces the ACTIM statistics service on behalf of Football DataCo.

Football DataCo is wholly owned by Premier League and The Football League.

== Fees ==
Football DataCo charges a standard fee for the reproduction of fixture lists, which currently stands at: £266 plus VAT to print the fixtures of one English club.

Newspapers printing the fixtures of all clubs are charged around £3,931 plus VAT by DataCo for a date ordered listing.

The money accrued by Football DataCo for the rights to this data is distributed to league clubs on an egalitarian basis, approximately:

- 18% to Premier League clubs;
- 56% to Football League clubs;
- 25% to Scottish Professional Football League clubs.

== Controversy ==
The company has been racked by controversy in the UK media, after a 2004 European Court of Justice ruling that the Premier League and Football League cannot use the European Database Directive to demand payment from media and pools companies for the publication of fixture lists. Football DataCo refute the ruling, arguing that a legal precedent was set in the UK back in 1959, when the Football League won a landmark copyright victory against Littlewoods, claiming income from the pools company for their use of the fixtures list.

Staunch opponents of Football DataCo argue that the ruling is long out of date, and needs to be brought more inline with the advances in information collection and delivery that we are seeing with the World Wide Web.

Small, independently owned football fan sites have been badly hit by Football DataCo, who even charge non-profit making enterprises the standard fee for use of single club fixture data unless adopted by a club as a "Nominated Fanzine" in which case the charge is £1.00 plus VAT. This has meant that many fanzines have been threatened with removal of the fixtures by Football DataCo.

The company has also challenged many not-for-profit websites over their use of football club badges on their websites.

The licensing business outside of the UK is handled by Fixtures Marketing Ltd, which has filed lawsuits against Finnish Oy Veikkaus AB, Swedish AB Svenska Spel and Greek Organismos Prognostikon Agonon Pododfairou AE for using fixture lists without a licence.

== Court case results ==
On Monday 12 November 2012, the long running claim brought by the English and Scottish professional football leagues ("the Leagues"), their licensing agent, Football DataCo ("FDC"), and its sub-contractor PA Sport ("the Claimants") was brought to an end. The Claimants told the Court of Appeal that following the European Court of Justice's decision "CJEU Judgment"). They accepted they did not have rights in the Fixture Lists enabling them to charge licence fees for use of their fixture lists – some four years after the case had begun.

At the hearing, the Court of Appeal declared that:

- Neither database copyright nor sui generis database rights subsists in the EU in Fixtures Lists.
- Ordered Football DataCo, PA Sport (FDC's sub-contractor) and the Football League Limited to carry a message on their respective websites for a month clarifying the position in the following form: Following the decision of the Court of Justice of the European Union dated 1 March 2012 in Case C-604/10 Football Dataco Ltd v Yahoo! UK Ltd & Others (click here), it has been determined that neither copyright nor sui generis database rights subsist in the EU in fixture lists for the English and Scottish football leagues."
- Ordered that the Claimants pay the costs of the Defendants (namely Yahoo! Stan James, Stan James (Abingdon) and Enetpulse).
