= Copyfraud =

False copyright claims to public-domain content

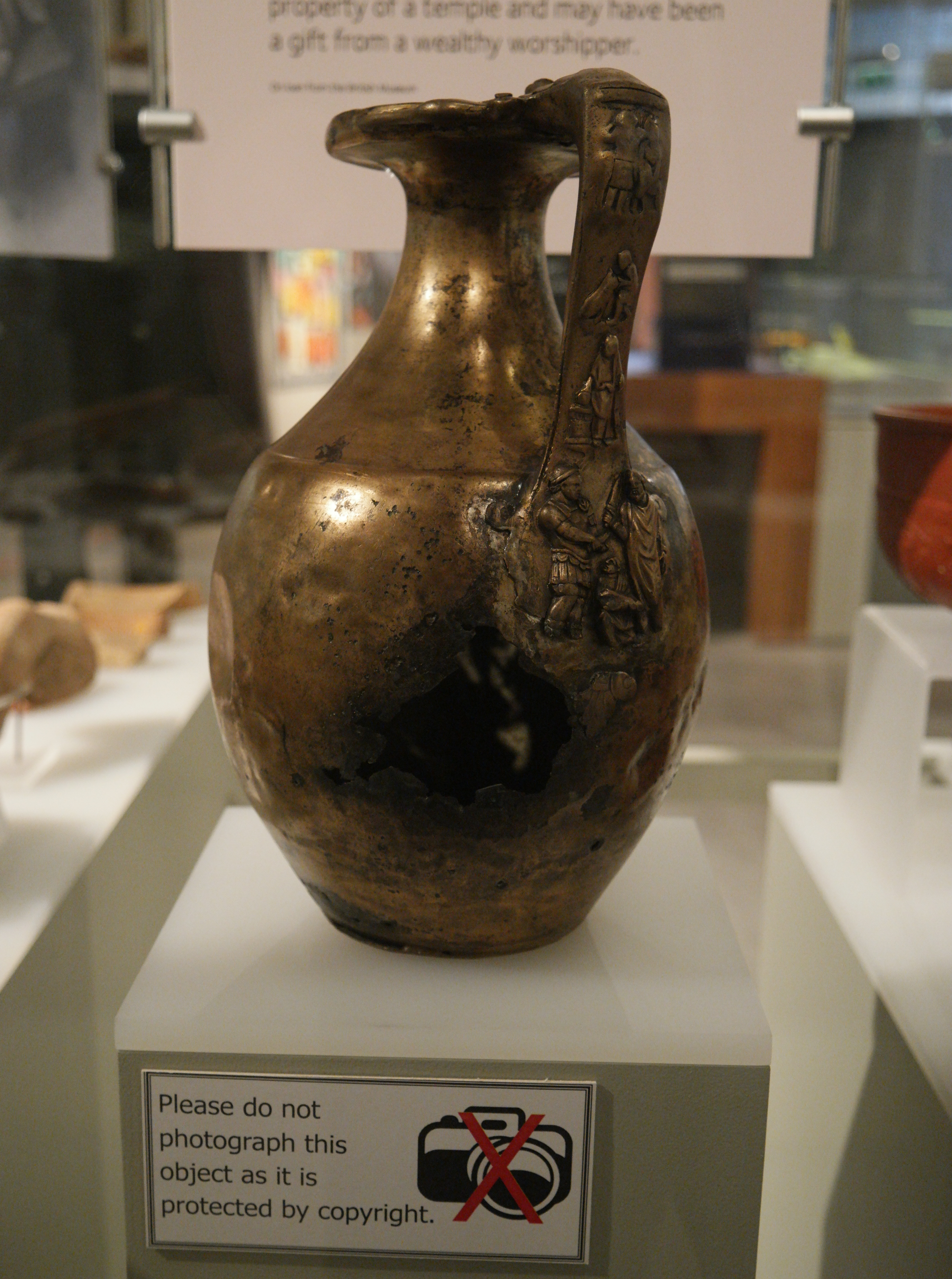
Second-century bronze jug held by the British Museum, with false copyright claim, while on loan to Tullie House Museum

A copyfraud is a false copyright claim by an individual or institution with respect to content that is in the public domain. Such claims are unlawful, at least under US and Australian copyright law, because material that is not copyrighted is free for all to use, modify and reproduce. Copyfraud also includes overreaching claims by publishers, museums and others, as where a legitimate copyright owner knowingly, or with constructive knowledge, claims rights beyond what the law allows.

The term copyfraud was coined by Jason Mazzone, a professor of law at the University of Illinois. Because copyfraud carries little or no oversight by authorities and few legal consequences, it exists on a massive scale, with millions of works in the public domain falsely labelled as copyrighted. Payments are therefore unnecessarily made by businesses and individuals for licensing fees. Mazzone states that copyfraud stifles valid reproduction of free material, discourages innovation and undermines free speech rights. Other legal scholars have suggested public and private remedies, and a few cases have been brought involving copyfraud.

== Definition ==
Mazzone describes copyfraud as:

- Claiming copyright ownership of public domain material.
- Imposition by a copyright owner of restrictions beyond what the law allows.
- Claiming copyright ownership on the basis of ownership of copies or archives.
- Attaching copyright notices to a public domain work converted to a different medium.

== Legal issues ==
=== False claims of copyright ===
Copyfraud stifles creativity and imposes financial costs upon consumers. False copyright claims lead individuals to pay unnecessarily for licenses and to forgo entirely projects that make legitimate uses of public domain materials. Copyfraud is a land grab. It represents private control over the public domain. Copyfraud upsets the balance that the law has struck between private rights and the interests of the public in creative works.

— Jason Mazzone

According to copyright experts Jason Mazzone and Stephen Fishman, a massive amount of works in the public domain are reprinted and sold by large publishers that state or imply they own copyrights in those works. While selling copies of public domain works is legal, claiming or implying ownership of a copyright in those works can amount to fraud.

Mazzone notes that although the US government protects copyrights, it offers little protection to works in the public domain. Consequently, false claims of copyright over public domain works (copyfraud) are common. The profits earned by publishers falsely claiming copyrights have been immense. Section 506(c) of United States Code (USC) Title 17 prohibits three distinct acts: (1) placing a false notice of copyright on an article; (2) publicly distributing articles which bear a false copyright notice; and (3) importing for public distribution articles which bear a false copyright notice. The prosecution must prove that the act alleged was committed "with fraudulent intent". Violations of sections 506(c) and 506(d) are each punishable by a fine of up to $2,500. No private right of action exists under either of these provisions. No company has ever been prosecuted for violating this law.

Mazzone argues that copyfraud is usually successful because there are few and weak laws criminalizing false statements about copyrights, lax enforcement of such laws, few people who are competent to give legal advice on the copyright status of material and few people willing to risk a lawsuit to resist the fraudulent licensing fees that resellers demand.

=== Restricting use with licenses ===
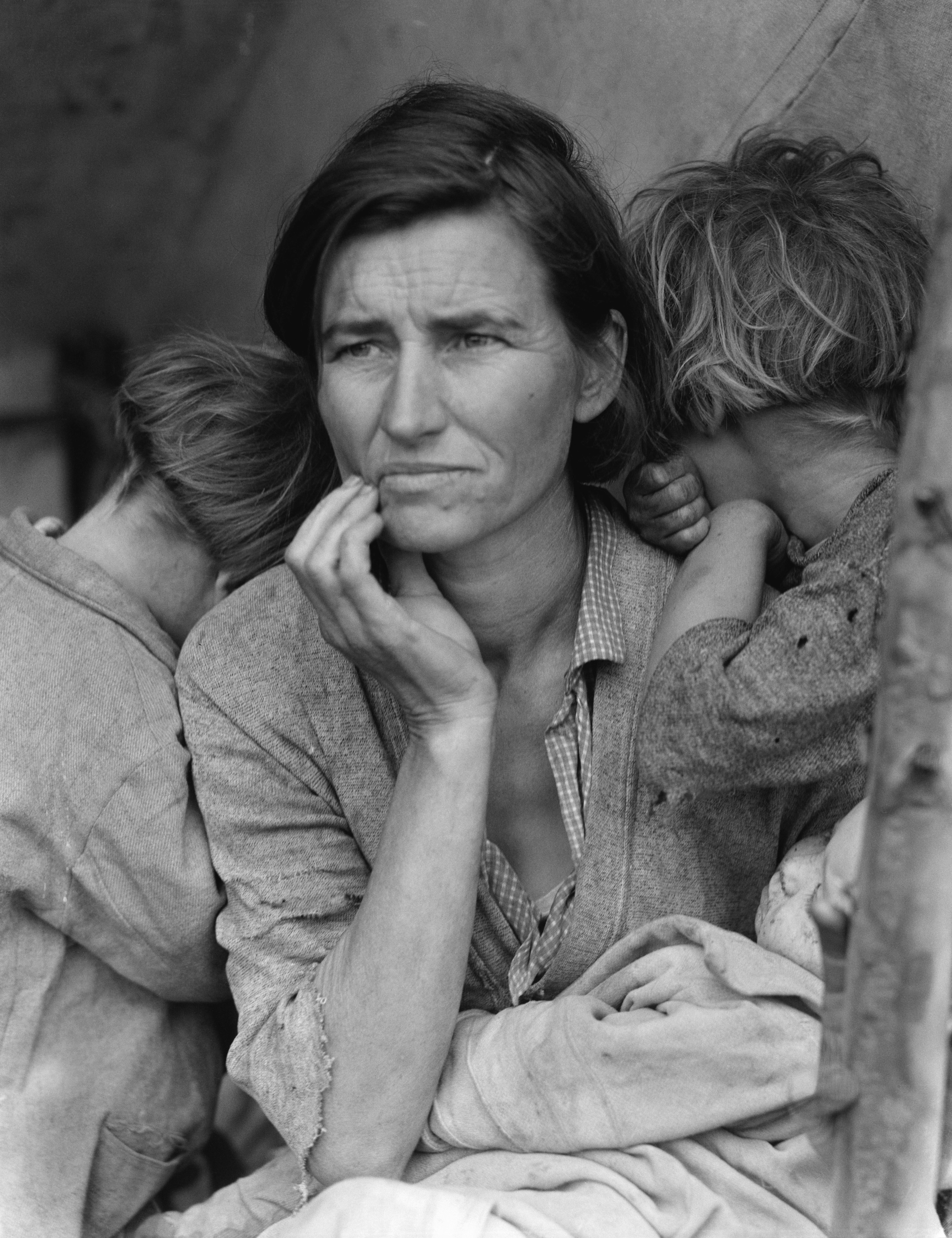
"Migrant mother", by Dorothea Lange

Companies that sell public domain material under false claims of copyright often require the buyer to agree to a contract commonly referred to as a license. Many such licenses for material bought online require a buyer to click a button to "accept" their terms before they can access the material. Book publishers, both hard copy and e-books, sometimes include a license-like statement in compilations of public domain material purporting to restrict how the buyer can use the printed material. For instance, Dover Publications, which publishes collections of public domain clip art, often includes statements purporting to limit how the illustrations can be used. Fishman states that while the seller cannot sue successfully for copyright infringement under federal law, they can sue for breach of contract under the license.

Public domain photos by Walker Evans and Dorothea Lange, available for unrestricted downloads from the Library of Congress, are also available from Getty Images after agreeing to their terms and paying license fees of up to $5,000 for a six-month term. When photographer Carol M. Highsmith sued Getty Images for asserting they owned copyrights to photos she donated to the public domain, Getty admitted that her images were in the public domain, but said it nonetheless had a right to charge a fee for distributing the material, since "Distributing and providing access to public domain content is different from asserting ownership of it". (Note: Alamy, another defendant in the Highsmith case, asserted, "Publishers and others rely on Alamy and its competitors as sources of historical, archival and culturally relevant material, and for the service of providing easy searching and access to a broad range of subjects. For example, one of the most published images, and one in the public domain, Dorothy Lange's Migrant Mother, is available on Alamy from a number of historical collections. In this regard Alamy is merely a modern entrant into a long industry tradition of preserving, cataloging and distributing important historical and archival images.")

Fishman believes that because US federal law preempts state law when it conflicts with federal law, such copyright-like licenses should be unenforceable. However, the first two cases dealing with violations of such licenses decided that the licenses were enforceable, even though the material used was in the public domain: see ProCD, Inc. v. Zeidenberg (1996) and Matthew Bender v. Jurisline (2000).

== Types of material ==
=== Printed works ===
From the U.S. Constitution to old newspapers, from the paintings of old masters to the national anthem, the public domain has been copyrighted ... Copyfraud is the most outrageous type of overreaching in intellectual property law because it involves claims to a copyright where none at all exist.

— Jason Mazzone

A collection of public domain material, whether scanned and digitized, (Note: The US Copyright Office stated that "digitization ... does not result in a new work of authorship" to allow a copyright.) or reprinted, only protects the arrangement of the material, but not the individual works collected. However, publishers of many public domain collections will nonetheless place a copyright notice covering the entire publication. (Note: ProQuest offers an online searchable database of newspapers from the nineteenth century on, with each displayed page showing a copyright notice.)

Most of the text, illustrations and photos published by the US government are in the public domain and free from copyright. Some exceptions might include a publication that includes copyrighted material, such as non-government photos. But many publishers include a copyright notice on reproduced government documents, such as one on the Warren Report. Knowing that the penalty for making a false copyright claim on a copied government publication is small, some publishers simply ignore the laws.

=== Digital libraries ===
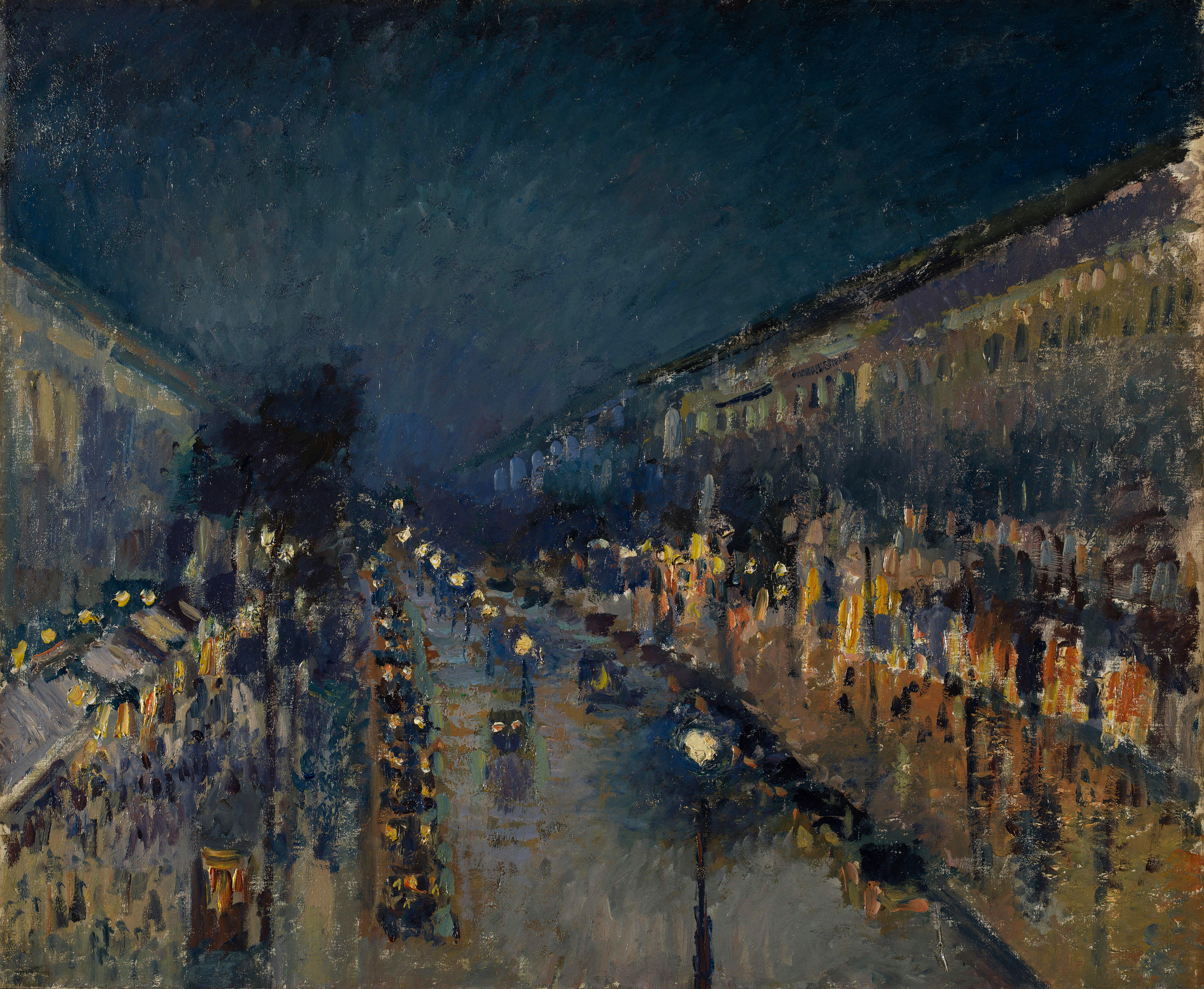
Camille Pissarro's The Boulevard Montmartre at Night (1898)

Publishers have often placed copyright notices and restrictions on their reproductions of public domain artwork and photos. However, there is no copyright for reproduction, whether by photograph or even a painted reproduction, since there is no original creativity. One famous court case which explained that was Bridgeman Art Library v. Corel Corp. in 1999: The "skill, labor or judgment merely in the process of copying cannot confer originality". (Note: "The Court is persuaded that its original conclusion that Bridgeman's transparencies are not copyrightable under British law was correct.") Despite the clear ruling of a US federal court, however, Mazzone notes that the Bridgeman Art Library has been "undeterred by its loss in court and continues to assert copyright in reproductions" of countless public domain works by famous artists of previous centuries, such as Camille Pissarro. (Note: Portion of Bridgeman's Terms and Conditions: "Unless otherwise indicated, all of the content featured or displayed on the Site, including, but not limited to, text, graphics, data, photographic images, moving images, sound, illustrations, software and the selection and arrangement thereof ("Bridgeman Images Content"), is owned by Bridgeman Images, its licensors or its third-party image partners. All elements of the Site, including the Bridgeman Images Content, are protected by copyright, trademark, patent, trade secret and other intellectual property laws and treaties.")

Mazzone also uses the example of Corbis, founded by Bill Gates, which was merged with Getty Images, a similar stock photo company. Getty has over 200 million items for sale, most of which have been scanned and digitized to be sold and distributed online. Its vast collection includes many images of two-dimensional public domain works. Other digital libraries, including ARTstor and Art Resource, have claimed copyright over images they supply and imposed restrictions on how the images can be used.

=== Original artworks, manuscripts and archives ===
Besides online digital libraries, a number of libraries, archives and museums which hold original manuscripts, photos and fine art, have claimed to have copyright over copies they make of those items because they possess the original. However, many of those items were created before the 20th century and have become part of the public domain. One example that Mazzone gives is that of the American Antiquarian Society, which has a large archive of early American documents. Its terms and conditions for obtaining a copy of any of those documents require agreeing to their license, along with payment.

Another repository, the New York State Historical Association's Fenimore Art Museum in New York, similarly requires that a user of its archive first agree to their terms before visiting or reproducing anything from its collection of nineteenth and early 20th century photographs, most of which have long become part of the public domain.

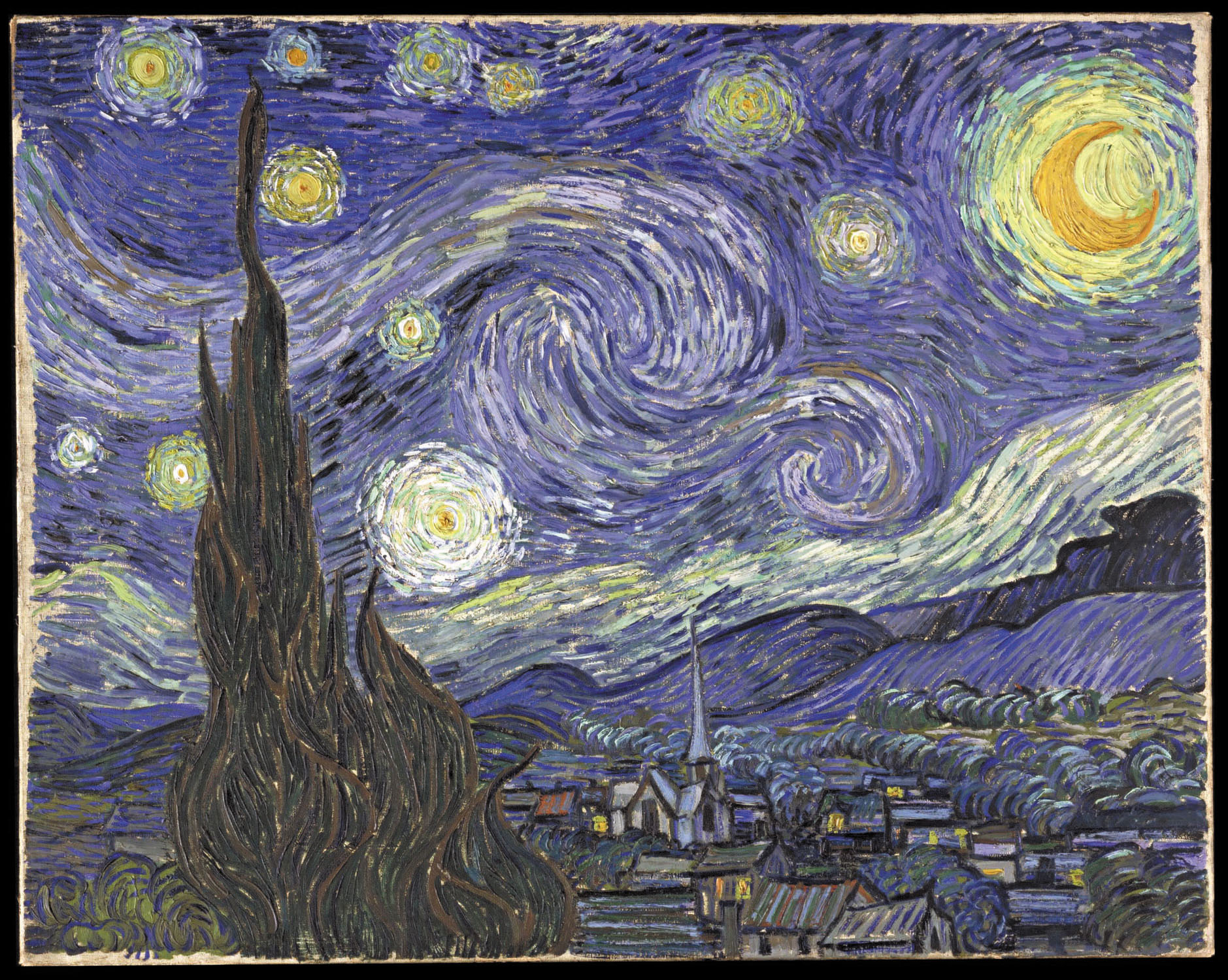
Reproductions of public domain works by artists such as Van Gogh are often printed by museums with a false copyright notice.

According to Mazzone, archives and museums typically assert ownership of copyrights where none exist, and wrongly require users to agree to their license and terms and conditions. Former president of the Society of American Archivists, Peter Hirtle, has written that "many repositories would like to maintain a kind of quasi-copyright-like control over the further use of materials in their holding, comparable to the monopoly granted to a copyright owner." Mazzone, for one, finds the trend of false claims of copyright by public, taxpayer-supported institutions, especially troubling: "We should be able to expect in return that public domain works be left in the public domain." He credits the Library of Congress among the shrinking list of archives that properly states whether a work is copyrighted.

The Museum of Fine Arts, Boston, for example, includes in its vast collection of artworks many from the nineteenth century. Although they have become part of the public domain, the museum claims they own the copyrights to them and therefore requires a visitor to agree to its terms before obtaining a copy of any works, i.e.: "The Images are not simple reproductions of the works depicted and are protected by copyright ... The MFA regularly makes images available for reproduction and publication in, for example, research papers and textbooks".

=== Public domain films ===
The owners of the actual physical copies of public domain footage often impose restrictions on its use along with charging licensing fees. The result is that documentary filmmakers have in many cases found it nearly impossible to either make a film or else have dropped projects entirely. In one example, filmmaker Gordon Quinn of Kartemquin Films in Chicago learned that the public domain federal government footage he wanted to use in a film was considered copyrighted by a director who then wanted payment to use it. Similarly, Stanford professor Jan Krawitz needed to incorporate a public domain clip into an instructional film, but the archive that had the film made no distinction between copyrighted works and public domain works, thereby requiring her to pay a substantial fee.

According to Matt Dunne, who wrote about this problem in a popular filmmaking trade journal, filmmakers are now "abandoning projects because of cost or self-censoring materials ... the sense in the independent filmmaker community is that the problem [of clearance authorization] has reached a crisis point." As a result, MovieMaker magazine, another trade journal, suggests that producers should "never assume that any film clip is in the public domain". Mazzone describes this new "licensing culture" as becoming an entrenched norm built on fear of using any prior work without permission. These clearance fees are typically a major portion of a film's budget, which leads more producers to simply cut any footage out of a film rather than deal with obtaining permissions. The industry motto, according to entertainment attorney Fernando Ramirez, is "When in doubt, cut it out."

== Analysis ==
As a practical matter it is usually too expensive and difficult to file a lawsuit to establish that a copyright claim is spurious. In effect, the federal government encourages spurious copyright claims. The potential economic rewards for making such claims are great, while the possibility of getting caught and paying a price is small.

— Stephen Fishman

Mazzone places blame on both violators and the government:

Copyright law itself creates strong incentives for copyfraud. The Copyright Act provides for no civil penalty for falsely claiming ownership of public domain materials. There is also no remedy under the Act for individuals who wrongly refrain from legal copying or who make payment for permission to copy something they are in fact entitled to use for free. While falsely claiming copyright is technically a criminal offense under the Act, prosecutions are extremely rare. These circumstances have produced fraud on an untold scale, with millions of works in the public domain deemed copyrighted, and countless dollars paid out every year in licensing fees to make copies that could be made for free. Copyfraud stifles valid forms of reproduction and undermines free speech.

He also adds that "copyfraud upsets the constitutional balance and undermines First Amendment values", chilling free expression and stifling creativity.

== By jurisdiction ==
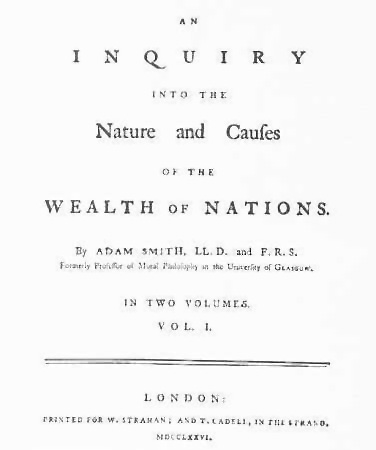
Modern editions of public domain books hundreds of years old, such as Adam Smith's Wealth of Nations (1776), are often sold under a claim of copyright by the new publisher.

=== United States ===
In the US Copyright Act, only two sections deal with improper assertions of copyright on public domain materials: Section 506(c) criminalizes fraudulent uses of copyright notices, and Section 506(e) punishes knowingly making a false representation of a material fact in the application for copyright registration. Section 512(f) additionally punishes using the safe harbor provisions of the Digital Millennium Copyright Act to remove material the issuer knows is not infringing.

But the US Copyright Act does not expressly provide for any civil actions to remedy illegal copyright claims over public domain materials, nor does the Act prescribe relief for individuals who have been damaged: either by refraining from copying or by paying for a license to use public domain material. Professor Peter Suber has argued that the US government should "make the penalties for copyfraud (false claim of copyright) at least as severe as the penalties for infringement; that is, take the wrongful decrease in the circulation of ideas at least as seriously as the wrongful increase in the circulation of ideas."

Legal scholar Paul J. Heald wrote that payment demands for spurious copyright infringement might be resisted in civil lawsuits under a number of commerce-law theories: (1) Breach of warranty of title; (2) unjust enrichment; (3) fraud; and (4) false advertising. Heald cited a case in which the first of these theories was used successfully in a copyright context: Tams-Witmark Music Library v. New Opera Company. (Note: In this case an opera company purchased the right to perform the opera The Merry Widow for $50,000 a year. After a little more than a year of performances, the company discovered that the work had passed into the public domain several years before due to a failure on the part of the copyright holder to renew the copyright. It ceased paying royalties, and after being sued by the owner of the abandoned copyright, counterclaimed for damages in the amount paid to the owner on a breach of warranty/failure of consideration theory. The trial court awarded the opera company $50,500 in damages, and the court of appeals affirmed the judgement, finding that The Merry Widow "passed, finally, completely and forever into the public domain and became freely available to the unrestricted use of anyone".)

Cory Doctorow, in a 2014 Boing Boing article, noted the "widespread practice of putting restrictions on scanned copies of public domain books online" and the many "powerful entities who lobby online services for a shoot now/ask questions later approach to copyright takedowns, while the victims of the fraud have no powerful voice advocating for them." Professor Tanya Asim Cooper wrote that Corbis's claims to copyright in its digital reproductions of public domain art images are "spurious ... abuses ... restricting access to art that belongs to the public by requiring payment of unnecessary fees and stifling the proliferation of new, creative expression, of 'Progress' that the Constitution guarantees.

Charles Eicher pointed out the prevalence of copyfraud with respect to Google Books, Creative Commons' efforts to "license" public domain works, and other areas. He explained one of the methods: After you scan a public domain book, "reformat it as a PDF, mark it with a copyright date, register it as a new book with an ISBN, then submit it to Amazon.com for sale [or] as an ebook ... [then] submit it to Google Books for inclusion in its index. Google earns a small kickback on every sale referred to Amazon or other booksellers." (Note: Eicher suggests several remedies: "Government should act [by using its regulatory power] to secure its authority over copyrights. ... Private interests should be prohibited from exerting pseudo-regulatory powers. ... Anti-trust actions could break up the newly forming publishing cartel [of Google and Amazon] before it becomes entrenched. ... Google's orphan books settlement should be given further judicial review and invalidated. ... Google and Amazon should be prohibited from offering books with false copyrights, and the public should be empowered to flag copyfraud books and issue a take-down notice.")

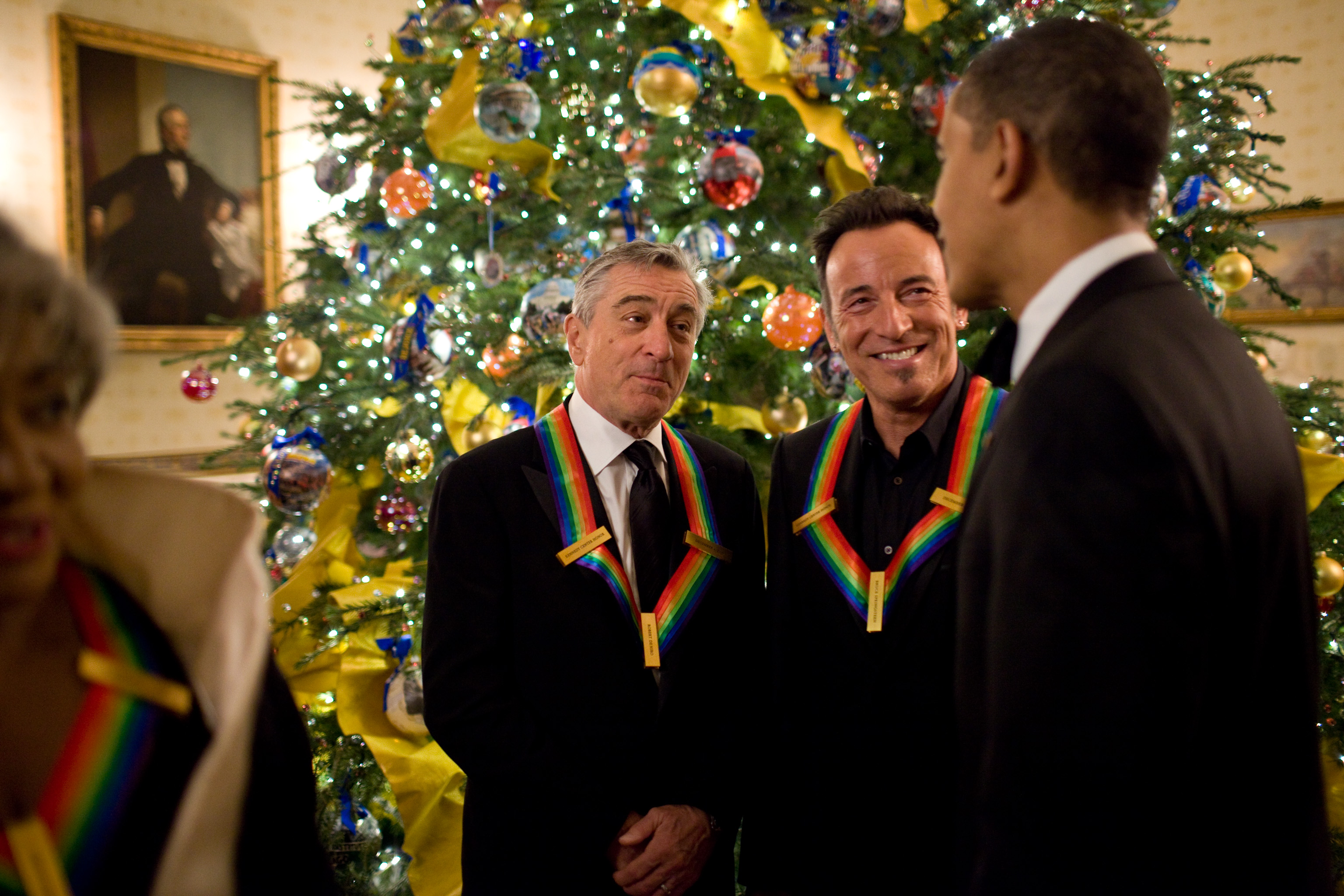
This image from The White House's Flickr account is free of copyright because it is a US federal government work. Yet, it bears a false claim that the "photograph may not be manipulated in any way".

=== United Kingdom ===
In the United Kingdom, Ronan Deazley and Robert Sullivan argued in 2011 that terms which require users to pay a licence fee for what should be fair dealing as permitted by copyright law could be in breach of section 2 of the Fraud Act 2006, and constitute the offence of fraud by false representation.

It has nonetheless been common for museums and repositories to claim rights over images of material in their collections and to charge reproduction fees. In November 2017, 27 prominent art historians, museum curators and critics wrote to The Times newspaper, to urge that "fees charged by the UK's national museums to reproduce images of historic paintings, prints and drawings are unjustified, and should be abolished". They commented that "[m]useums claim they create a new copyright when making a faithful reproduction of a 2D artwork by photography or scanning, but it is doubtful that the law supports this". They argued that the fees inhibit the dissemination of knowledge, the very purpose of public museums and galleries, and so "pose a serious threat to art history". Therefore, they advised the UK's national museums "to follow the example of a growing number of international museums (such as the Netherlands' Rijksmuseum) and provide open access to images of publicly owned, out-of-copyright paintings, prints and drawings so that they are free for the public to reproduce". A 2022 study by Andrea Wallace found "a fundamental misunderstanding of what the public domain is, includes and should include" among UK galleries, libraries, archives and museums.

This may be changing. A November 2023 Appeal Court judgment (THJ v. Sheridan, 2023) by Lord Justice Arnold clarified that, in the UK, no new copyright is created in making a photographic reproduction of a two-dimensional public domain artwork. In addition, investigations have revealed that, in many museums, the administrative costs of imposing reproduction fees have outstripped the income generated, and so the practice has led to museums losing money.

=== Australia ===
In Australia, section 202 of the Australian Copyright Act 1968 imposes penalties for "groundless threats of legal proceedings" and provides a cause of action for any false claims of copyright infringement. This includes false claims of copyright ownership of public domain material, or claims to impose copyright restrictions beyond those permitted by the law.

== Lawsuits alleging improper claims of copyright ==
- In 1984, Universal Studios sued Nintendo to stop Nintendo from profiting on its Donkey Kong arcade game, claiming that Donkey Kong was too similar to Universal's King Kong. Nintendo's lawyers showed that Universal had successfully argued in 1975 legal proceedings against RKO General that King Kong was in the public domain. Nintendo also won the appeal, a counterclaim and a further appeal.
- In 2006, Michael Crook filed false Digital Millennium Copyright Act (DMCA) claims against websites, claiming copyright on screenshots of his appearance on the Fox News show Hannity & Colmes. In a March 2007 settlement, Crook agreed to withdraw the claims, "take a copyright law course and apologize for interfering with the free speech rights of his targets".
- In 2013, the Arthur Conan Doyle estate was accused of copyfraud by Leslie Klinger in a lawsuit in Illinois for demanding that Klinger pay a license fee for the use in his book of the character Sherlock Holmes and other characters and elements in Conan Doyle's works published before 1923. The U.S. Court of Appeals for the Seventh Circuit sided with Klinger that these characters and elements are in the American public domain.
- In 2013, Good Morning to You Productions, a documentary film company, sued Warner/Chappell Music for falsely claiming copyright to the song "Happy Birthday to You". In September 2015, the court granted summary judgement ruling that Warner/Chappell's copyright claim was invalid and that the song is in the public domain, except for Warner/Chappell's specific piano arrangements of the song.
- In 2015, Lenz v. Universal Music Corp. affirmed a holding that copyright owners must consider fair use in good faith before issuing a takedown notice for content posted on the internet. Boing Boing considers such uses of the DMCA to be "bogus complaints" a kind of copyfraud. Improper claims of copyright with respect to works used under a free license, such as one by German royalty collector GEMA in 2011, have been termed copyfraud.
- In 2016, photographer Carol M. Highsmith sued two stock photography organizations, Getty Images and Alamy, for $1.35 billion over their attempts to assert copyright over, and charge fees for the use of, 18,755 of her images, which she releases royalty-free. Getty had sent her a bill for one of the images, which she used on her own website. In November 2016, the court dismissed the lawsuit with respect to the federal copyright claims, and the remaining issues were settled out of court.
- In 2016, lawsuits were filed by the same legal team who brought the 2013 "Happy Birthday" lawsuit, alleging false claims of copyright with respect to the songs "We Shall Overcome" and "This Land Is Your Land".
- SCO Group, Inc. v. Novell, Inc.
- Online Policy Group v. Diebold, Inc. (a misrepresentation case related to a DMCA takedown)
- In 2019, YouTube filed a lawsuit against an individual whom they allege abused DMCA takedowns to extort money from other users of the website.
- In 2023, Jose Teran was sentenced to 70 months in prison. Teran and Webster Batista created MediaMuv to falsely claim copyrights to 50,000 songs and receive more than $23 million in royalties.

== Other notable use and recognition of improper copyright claims ==
- In 2009, lawyers representing the National Portrait Gallery (NPG) notified Derrick Coetzee, an editor/administrator of the free content multimedia repository Wikimedia Commons, hosted by the Wikimedia Foundation, that 3,300 downloaded images of copyright-expired artworks it housed violated its copyrights.
- In 2015, the American Antiquarian Society, previously criticized for claiming proprietary rights over its collection material in the public domain, updated its website to reflect a rights and reproductions policy that makes no claims to copyright. The AAS allows users to "freely download and use any of [the] images" on its online image database, and it does not require a user to cite the library as a source. Additionally, the AAS now allows unrestricted photography within its reading room.
- In 2015, two people obtained a 3D scan of the bust of Nefertiti displayed at the Neues Museum in Berlin. They released the data on the internet, allowing the public to copy the bust. Their aim was to defy "a culture of 'hyperownership'" and "the strict limitations that museums often place on sharing the informational data regarding their collection with the public. ... Even when their cases lack legal support, museums and governments can try to use copyright or contract law to restrict access to cultural materials, to claim that they own all of the data and images outright, or to use digital rights management technology to lock up their data altogether. The result is 'copyfraud'".
- In 2015, a company called Rumblefish falsely claimed a copyright on a YouTube video of the public-domain song America the Beautiful, as performed by the United States Navy Band, whose performances are all public domain. After its claim was disputed by the uploader, Adafruit Industries, Rumblefish retracted the claim. In 2019, the same video was again hit with a false copyright claim, this time by The Orchard, a subsidiary of Sony Music.
- In 2015, Ashley Madison issued numerous DMCA notices to try to stop journalists and others from using public domain information. Sony did the same in 2014.
- In 2017, Portugal passed amendments to its anti-circumvention laws making it illegal to impose digital rights management to restrict usage of works that were already in the public domain.
- In 2019, Visual China Group, China's largest provider of stock photography, shut down its website after complaints that it had falsely claimed copyright over images such as the black hole image taken by the Event Horizon Telescope, the Chinese national flag and various corporate logos, such as that of Baidu.

== See also ==
- Atomium § Worldwide copyright claims
- Bridgeman Art Library v. Corel Corp.
- Censorship by copyright
- Copyright misuse
- Image reproduction rights
- National Portrait Gallery and Wikimedia Foundation copyright dispute
- Patent troll
- Reiss Engelhorn Museum § Wikimedia lawsuit
- Sweat of the brow
- YouTube copyright issues
