= Amaretto Ranch Breedables, LLC v. Ozimals, Inc. =

Amaretto Ranch Breedables, LLC vs. Ozimals, Inc.
- Court: United States District Court for the Northern District of California
- Decided: December 21, 2010
- Docket nos.: 3:10-cv-05696
- Citations: Amaretto Ranch Breedables, LLC v. Ozimals, Inc.

Case history
- Subsequent action: litigation terminated July 2013

Holding
- Motion for Temporary Restraining Order GRANTED in favor of Amaretto

Court membership
- Judge sitting: Charles Breyer

Keywords
- DMCA takedown; Preliminary injunction; Temporary restraining order

Amaretto Ranch Breedables, LLC v. Ozimals, Inc. was a copyright case in the United States District Court for the Northern District of California involving a DMCA takedown notice dispute between companies that produce virtual animals on Second Life. Ozimals filed a DMCA takedown notice to Linden Research, the makers of Second life, claiming that Amaretto's horse infringed on their bunnies and demanding their removal. Consequently, Amaretto responded with a counter-DMCA notice and applied to the court for a temporary restraining order to forbid Linden Research from removing their virtual horses. This was granted and held in effect as the case proceeded. Amaretto claimed in court that Ozimal's DMCA notice was copyright misuse and asked for a declaration that its horses did not infringe copyright. Ozimals counterclaimed for copyright infringement. The court eventually dismissed both claims.

== Background ==
Second Life is an online website where users can live out their virtual lives. Users can make and sell their own virtual items. Ozimals is a company that creates virtual bunnies which can be purchased and raised in Second Life through feeding them virtual food. Amaretto Ranch Breedables sells virtual horses which can also be purchased and raised in a similar fashion.

The Digital Millennium Copyright Act permits content owners to prevent infringement by seeking a court order that requires an internet service provider to block or remove access to content that allegedly infringes copyrighted content. In this case, Ozimals claimed that Amaretto Ranch Breedables’ horses infringed on their bunnies and filed a takedown notice for their horses and feed. Amaretto sued for a temporary restraining order and preliminary injunction barring Linden Research, the operator of Second Life, from removing their products.

== Case ==
As established in Winter v. Natural Res. Defense Council (2008), a plaintiff seeking preliminary injunction must show:

1. Likelihood to Succeed on the Merits
2. Likelihood of Irreparable Harm
3. Balance of Hardships Weighs in Favor of Plaintiffs
4. Public Interest Supports the Issuance of a Preliminary Injunction

Since software copyright protection does not apply to functionality as in this case, the case was considered likely to succeed. Amaretto did not directly copy Ozimal's source code, and the idea of a growing virtual animal that could be fed and raised is not copyrightable.

Likely irreparable harm is interesting in this case. Had the DMCA order gone through, it would have cut off Amaretto's source of income before it could challenge Ozimal's copyright claim. Their virtual horses would have died for lack of food, and though Ozimals stated that they would agree to Amaretto distributing their product for free, Amaretto understandably refused to do so. Furthermore, even if they were to litigate, had the takedown occurred, Amaretto would have lost a significant number of potential customers by missing out on the prime buying season. Judge Charles Breyer ruled that irreparable harm was likely in this case. For the same reason, he deemed that the balance of hardships would be in favor of the plaintiff.

Finally, there was no identifiable public interest in this case. Judge Breyer granted Amaretto the temporary restraining order against Linden Research from removing their horses until the preliminary injunction ruling.

== Subsequent Motions to Dismiss ==
=== Motion to dismiss First Amended Complaint ===
In April 2011, Ozimals was granted in part and denied in part their motion to dismiss Amaretto's First Amended Complaint (FAC).

They argued that

1. Section 512(f) Misrepresentation was not viable because no takedown had occurred. The judge agreed with Ozimals here, referring to Lenz v. Universal Music Corp., which stated that the damages incurred had to be from the DMCA removal of content.
2. Litigation privilege does not bar the tortious interference and unfair competition claims. The judge ruled in favor of Amaretto in this case, as the original DMCA notification was not a judicial proceeding.
3. Tortious interference claim wasn't plausibly pleaded. The judge sided with Ozimals here, ruling that merely arguing that the defendants falsely disparaged their products on online forums was not enough to determine interference with contract.
4. The unfair business practices claim should be dismissed. Here, the judge ruled that Amaretto's unfair business practices claim was viable here, as Ozimals didn't have a valid copyright.

Ozimals’ motion to dismiss was granted in part and denied in part. In response, Amaretto filed a Second Amended Complaint.

=== Motion to dismiss Second Amended Complaint ===
Ozimals also moved to dismiss Amaretto's Second Amended Complaint in July, which consisted of the following:

1. declaratory relief;
2. statutory and common law unfair competition;
3. copyright misuse;
4. defamation;
5. trade libel;
6. intentional interference with contract; and
7. tortious interference with prospective business advantage.

Ozimals moved to dismiss 2 and 6. Judge Breyer ruled against them on unfair competition, pointing out that it had already been decided in the previous case. However, he did dismiss the common law unfair competition claim, since that entails passing off one's goods as those of another. State law claims based on DMCA takedowns are preempted here by the federal nature of the DMCA, as referenced in Lenz v. Universal Music Corp. as well as OPG v. Diebold. Ozimal's motion to dismiss on this count is granted.

=== Further developments ===
Litigation continued into 2012, with several changes of attorney. Meanwhile, Second Life has backed away from the dispute, stating, "We no longer have a horse in that race or a bunny in that pot.". The court dismissed Ozimals copyright infringement claim because "Ozimals lacked standing to sue on the copyright in issue", and also dismissed Amaretto's requests for declaration that Ozimals' actions were copyright misuse and that its horses were not infringements, on the grounds of lack of subject matter jurisdiction. In July 2013 the final legal claims, relating to Amaretto's allegations that an Ozimals blog posting had defamed Amaretto, were also dismissed, ending the court proceedings.

== Significance ==
- Temporary restraining order and preliminary injunction were filed against a third party, Second Life, and granted.
- Misrepresentation determined to be not viable in a case where no takedown has actually occurred.
- Upheld Lenz and Diebold on DMCA preemption of state laws.

Legal blogger Eric Goldman’s take on the case was, “I generally like furry critters, but I'm beginning to hate the virtual horses and virtual bunnies for their deleterious effect on Internet law.”

== See also ==
- DMCA takedown
- Idea–expression divide
- OPG v. Diebold
- Lenz v. Universal Music Corp.
