= YouTomb =

Video removal database

YouTomb was a website built to track videos removed by popular American video-sharing website YouTube. The site operated a searchable database of recent video removals on YouTube. It tracked not only DMCA takedowns but also terms of use violations and user removals. Those videos removed due to DMCA takedowns were sortable by alleged copyright holder. The database was generated by software that repeatedly scanned YouTube for unavailable videos. The site was operated by the MIT chapter of Students for Free Culture and its source code is licensed under the GNU Affero General Public License. Although it only tracked YouTube, a future goal was to cover more video websites on YouTomb (unavailable as of November 2014).

== See also ==
- Lumen
