= Students for Free Culture =

Organization promoting open access, free culture, and campus activism

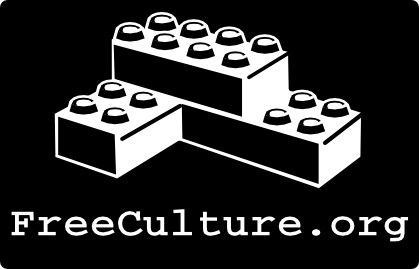
- Website: freeculture.org

Students for Free Culture, formerly known as FreeCulture.org, is an international student organization working to promote free culture ideals, such as cultural participation and access to information. It was inspired by the work of former Stanford, now Harvard, law professor Lawrence Lessig, who wrote the book Free Culture, and it frequently collaborates with other prominent free culture NGOs, including Creative Commons, the Electronic Frontier Foundation, and Public Knowledge. Students for Free Culture has over 30 chapters on college campuses around the world, and a history of grassroots activism.

Students for Free Culture is sometimes referred to as "FreeCulture", "the Free Culture Movement", and other variations on the "free culture" theme, but none of those are its official name. It is officially Students for Free Culture, as set for in the new bylaws that were ratified by its chapters on October 1, 2007, which changed its name from FreeCulture.org to Students for Free Culture.

== Goals ==
Students for Free Culture has stated its goals in a manifesto:

The mission of the Free Culture movement is to build a bottom-up, participatory structure to society and culture, rather than a top-down, closed, proprietary structure. Through the democratizing power of digital technology and the Internet, we can place the tools of creation and distribution, communication and collaboration, teaching and learning into the hands of the common person -- and with a truly active, connected, informed citizenry, injustice and oppression will slowly but surely vanish from the earth.

It has yet to publish a more "official" mission statement, but some of its goals are:

- decentralization of creativity—getting ordinary people and communities involved with art, science, journalism and other creative industries, especially through new technologies
- reforming copyright, patent, and trademark law in the public interest, ensuring that new creators are not stifled by old creators
- making important information available to the public

== Purpose ==
According to its website, Students for Free Culture has four main functions within the free culture movement:

- Creating and providing resources for its chapters and for the general public
- Outreach to youth and students
- Networking with other people, companies and organizations in the free culture movement
- Issue advocacy on behalf of its members

== History ==
=== Initial stirrings at Swarthmore College ===
Students for Free Culture had its origins in the Swarthmore Coalition for the Digital Commons (SCDC), a student group at Swarthmore College. The SCDC was founded in 2003 by students Luke Smith and Nelson Pavlosky, and was originally focused on issues related to free software, digital restrictions management, and treacherous computing, inspired largely by the Free Software Foundation. After watching Lawrence Lessig's OSCON 2002 speech entitled "free culture" however, they expanded the club's scope to cover cultural participation in general (rather than just in the world of software and computers), and began tackling issues such as copyright reform. In September 2004, SCDC was renamed Free Culture Swarthmore, laying the groundwork for Students for Free Culture and making it the first existing chapter.

=== OPG v. Diebold case ===
Within a couple of months of founding the SCDC, Smith and Pavlosky became embroiled in the controversy surrounding Diebold Election Systems (now Premier Election Solutions), a voting machine manufacturer accused of making bug-ridden and insecure electronic voting machines. The SCDC had been concerned about electronic voting machines using proprietary software rather than open source software, and kept an eye on the situation. Their alarm grew when a copy of Diebold's internal e-mail archives leaked onto the Internet, revealing questionable practices at Diebold and possible flaws with Diebold's machines, and they were spurred into action when Diebold began sending legal threats to voting activists who posted the e-mails on their websites. Diebold was claiming that the e-mails were their copyrighted material, and that anyone who posted these e-mails online was infringing upon their intellectual property. The SCDC posted the e-mail archive on its website and prepared for the inevitable legal threats.

Diebold sent takedown notices under the DMCA to the SCDC's ISP, Swarthmore College. Swarthmore took down the SCDC website, and the SCDC co-founders sought legal representation. They contacted the Electronic Frontier Foundation for help, and discovered that they had an opportunity to sign on to an existing lawsuit against Diebold, OPG v. Diebold, with co-plaintiffs from a non-profit ISP called the Online Policy Group who had also received legal threats from Diebold. With pro bono legal representation from EFF and the Stanford Cyberlaw Clinic, they sued Diebold for abusing copyright law to suppress freedom of speech online. After a year of legal battles, the judge ruled that posting the e-mails online was a fair use, and that Diebold had violated the DMCA by misrepresenting their copyright claims over the e-mails.

The network of contacts that Smith and Pavlosky built during the lawsuit, including dozens of students around the country who had also hosted the Diebold memos on their websites, gave them momentum they needed to found an international student movement based on the same free culture principles as the SCDC. They purchased the domain name Freeculture.org and began building a website, while contacting student activists at other schools who could help them start the organization.

=== FreeCulture.org launching at Swarthmore ===
On April 23, 2004, Smith and Pavlosky announced the official launch of FreeCulture.org, in an event at Swarthmore College featuring Lawrence Lessig as the keynote speaker (Lessig had released his book Free Culture less than a month beforehand.) The SCDC became the first Freeculture.org chapter (beginning the process of changing its name to Free Culture Swarthmore), and students from other schools in the area who attended the launch went on to found chapters on their campuses, including Bryn Mawr College and Franklin and Marshall.

=== Internet campaigns ===
FreeCulture.org began by launching a number of internet campaigns, in an attempt to raise its profile and bring itself to the attention of college students. These have covered issues ranging from defending artistic freedom (Barbie in a Blender) to fighting the Induce Act (Save The iPod), from celebrating Creative Commons licenses and the public domain (Undead Art) to opposing business method patents (Cereal Solidarity). While these one-shot websites succeeded in attracting attention from the press and encouraged students to get involved, they didn't directly help the local chapters, and the organization now concentrates less on web campaigns than it did in the past. However, their recent Down With DRM video contest was a successful "viral video" campaign against digital rights management (DRM), and internet campaigns remain an important tool in free culture activism.

=== Increased emphasis on local chapters ===
Today the organization focuses on providing services to its local campus chapters, including web services such as mailing lists and wikis, pamphlets and materials for tabling, and organizing conferences where chapter members can meet up. Active chapters are located at schools such as New York University (NYU), Harvard, MIT, Fordham Law, Dartmouth, University of Florida, Swarthmore, USC, Emory, and Yale.

The NYU chapter made headlines when it began protesting outside of record stores against DRM on CDs during the Sony rootkit scandal, resulting in similar protests around New York and Philadelphia.

In 2008, the MIT chapter developed and released YouTomb, a website to track videos removed by DMCA takedown from YouTube.

Other activities at local chapters include:

- art shows featuring Creative Commons-licensed art,
- mix CD-exchanging flash mobs,
- film-remixing contests,
- iPod liberating parties, where the organizers help people replace the proprietary DRM-encumbered operating system on their iPods with a free software system like Rockbox,
- Antenna Alliance, a project that provides free recording space to bands, releases their music online under Creative Commons licenses, and distributes the music to college radio stations,
- a campaign to promote open access on university campuses.

== Structure ==
Students for Free Culture began as a loose confederation of student groups on different campuses, but it has been moving towards becoming an official tax-exempt non-profit.

With the passage of official bylaws, Students for Free Culture now has a clear governance structure which makes it accountable to its chapters. The supreme decision-making body is the Board of Directors, which is elected once a year by the chapters, using a Schulze method for voting. It is meant to make long-term, high-level decisions, and should not meddle excessively in lower-level decisions. Practical everyday decisions will be made by the Core team, composed of any students who are members of chapters and meet the attendance requirements. Really low-level decisions and minutiae will be handled by a coordinator, who ideally will be a paid employee of the organization, and other volunteers and assistants. A new board of directors was elected in February 2008, and a new Core Team was assembled shortly thereafter. There is no coordinator yet.
