= Kai Puolamäki =

Finnish physicist

Kai Puolamäki is a Finnish physicist and Internet activist. He has been a vocal spokesman of the Finnish anti-copyright movement.

== Academic career ==
Puolamäki graduated from the University of Helsinki in 1996. In 2001 he presented his doctoral thesis titled Breaking of R-parity and supersymmetry in supersymmetric models. His earlier publications in physics have included articles on the Higgs boson.

Since 2003 his publications have concentrated on information technology and pattern recognition. He now works as researcher (equivalent to a North American assistant professor) at the Helsinki University of Technology in the Laboratory of Computer and Information Science (the former laboratory of professor emeritus Teuvo Kohonen).

== Internet activism ==
Puolamäki is a founder and board member of Electronic Frontier Finland, the Finnish counterpart to the Electronic Frontier Foundation, and has written many of the group's position papers. He has been a regular expert witness on copyright issues at the Finnish Parliament.

He has coined the term "copyright commandeering" to refer to instances of misuse of claims of exclusive rights under copyright. In 2006 he started the Anti-Commandeering Investigation, Training and Resources centre modeled on Anti-Piracy Investigation, Training and Resources centre of the International Federation of the Phonographic Industry (IFPI) to register instances of copyright commandeering.

In addition to blogging, he regularly contributes to the Finnish language sfnet.* and finet.* Usenet hierarchies. He is the unofficial maintainer of the finet.* hierarchy.
