= Reiss Engelhorn Museum =

Museum in Mannheim, Germany

- Reiss-Engelhorn-Museen
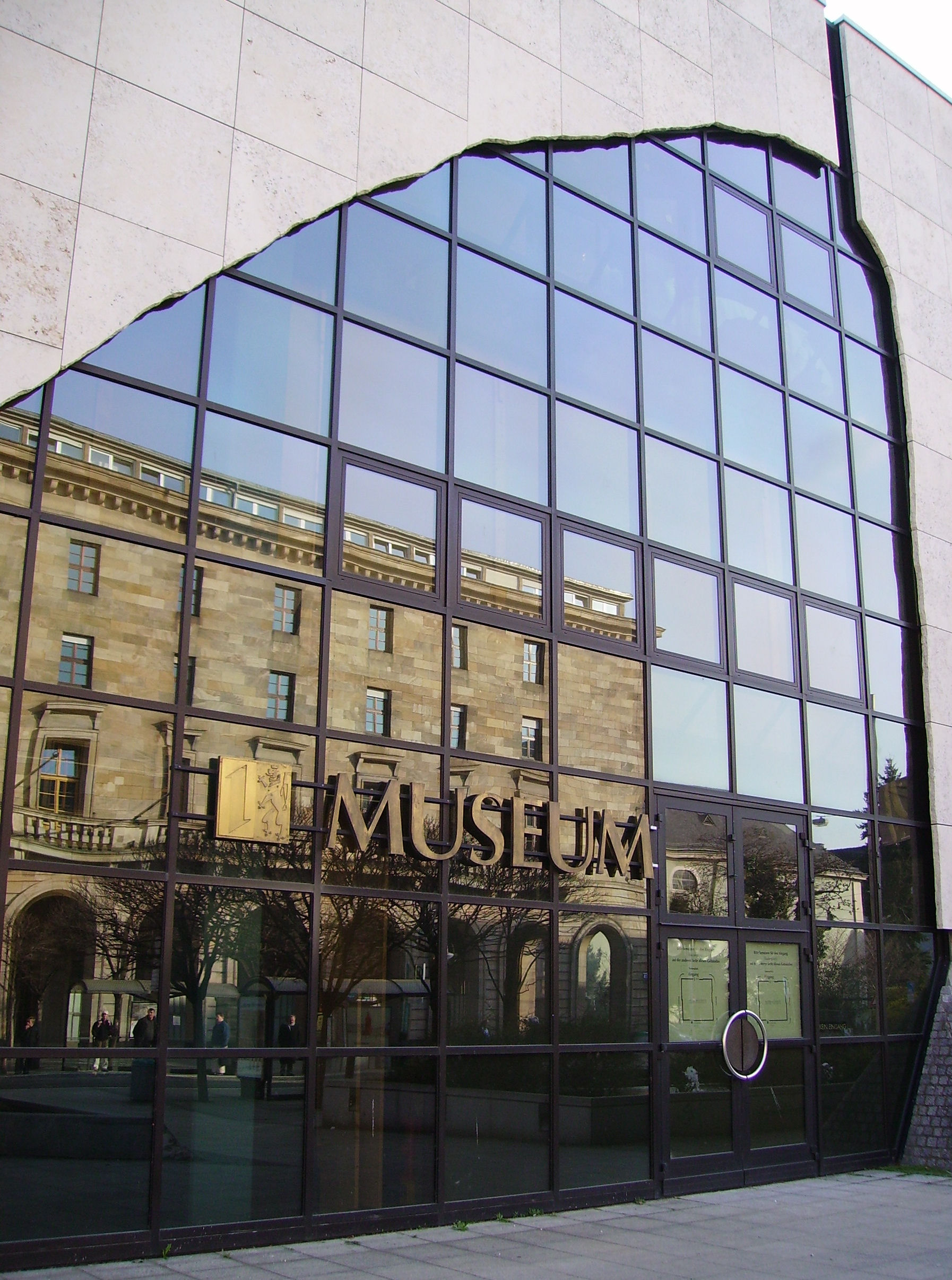
- Location: Mannheim, Germany
- Coordinates: 49°29′20″N 8°27′44″E
- Collection size: ~1.2 million objects
- Chairperson: Wilfried Rosendahl
- Website: www.rem-mannheim.de/en/

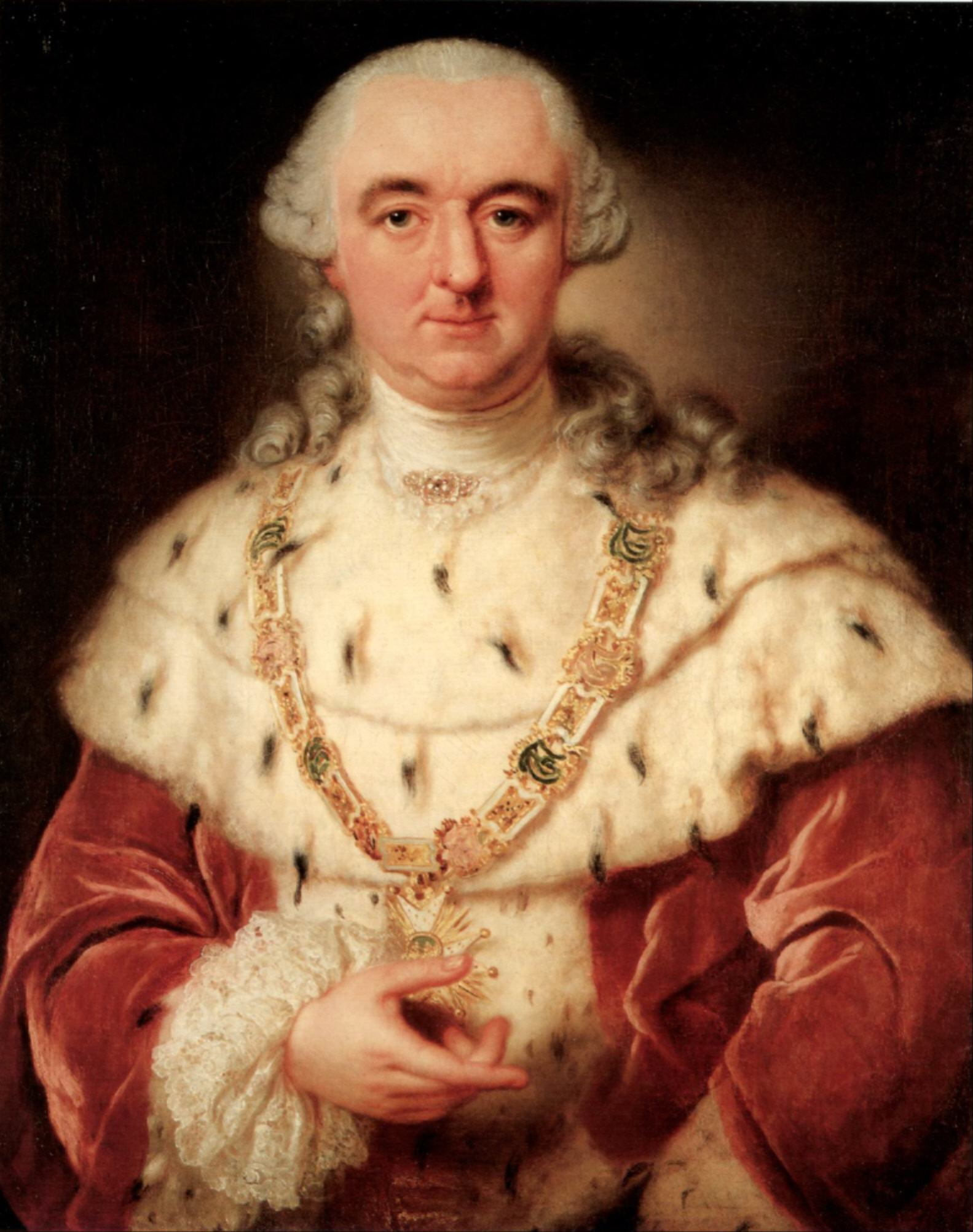
Portrait of Charles Theodore, Elector of Bavaria (1724-1799), painted by Anna Dorothea Lisiewska-Therbusch in 1763, and whose copyright is the subject of a lawsuit

The Reiss Engelhorn Museum (REM, stylised rem; Reiss-Engelhorn-Museen), is a museum in Mannheim, Germany. It has an exhibition area of 11,300 square metres (122,000 sq ft), and houses around 1.2 million objects.

== Facilities and collection ==
The Reiss-Engelhorn-Museum is one of the major museums in Mannheim and comprises four exhibition halls presenting exhibits in archaeology, world cultures, history of art and culture, photography and history of theater and music. From 2013 to 2021, Mathilde Grünewald worked there as a consultant for provincial Roman archaeology and curated the exhibition "A Touch of Rome".

The main facility is the Zeughaus Museum, which features exhibit areas for art, decorative art and cultural history, theater, literature and antiquities. The International Photography Forum, located on the fourth floor, displays photographs from the permanent collections ranging from 19th century to contemporary works and presents exhibitions.

The World Cultures Museum features displays of archaeology from the Metal Ages up through the Roman era, as well as medieval Germany, and ancient Egyptian art and culture.

The Bassermannhaus Museum of Music and Fine Arts features a large collection of musical instruments from around the world.

The Schillerhaus Museum is an 18th-century house that presents the life of Friedrich Schiller.

== Repatriation ==
In 2023 the museum was one of seven German museums to return Māori and Moriori remains to the Museum of New Zealand Te Papa Tongarewa in New Zealand.

== Wikimedia lawsuit ==
In 2015, the museum filed a lawsuit against the Wikimedia Foundation and Wikimedia Deutschland over the use of photographs of public domain artworks on the Wikimedia projects. In June 2016, a Berlin court (Landgericht Berlin) ruled that digitizing paintings that are in the public domain creates new copyrights, even if the intent is to create a faithful image of the public domain work. The lawsuit was dismissed with respect to Wikimedia Deutschland on the basis that it was not responsible for the files which are managed in the U.S. by the Wikimedia Foundation, which latter organization expressed the intent to appeal the decision.

In a related case, in May 2017, the Oberlandesgericht of Stuttgart ruled with reference to the concept of property (Sacheigentum). Property is addressed by article 14 of the German constitution. The Stuttgart court ruled that under German law already skill and effort restricts a photo under Lichtbild rules for 50 years, even though no creativity is involved and thus the more elaborate restrictions of a Lichtbildwerk do not apply (70 years pma). The court has allowed an appeal to the Federal Court of Justice (Bundesgerichtshof).

On 20 December 2018, the court decided in favour of the museum.

== See also ==
- National Portrait Gallery and Wikimedia Foundation copyright dispute
