= Wilfried Rosendahl =

German bioarchaeologist, geoscientist and cultural manager

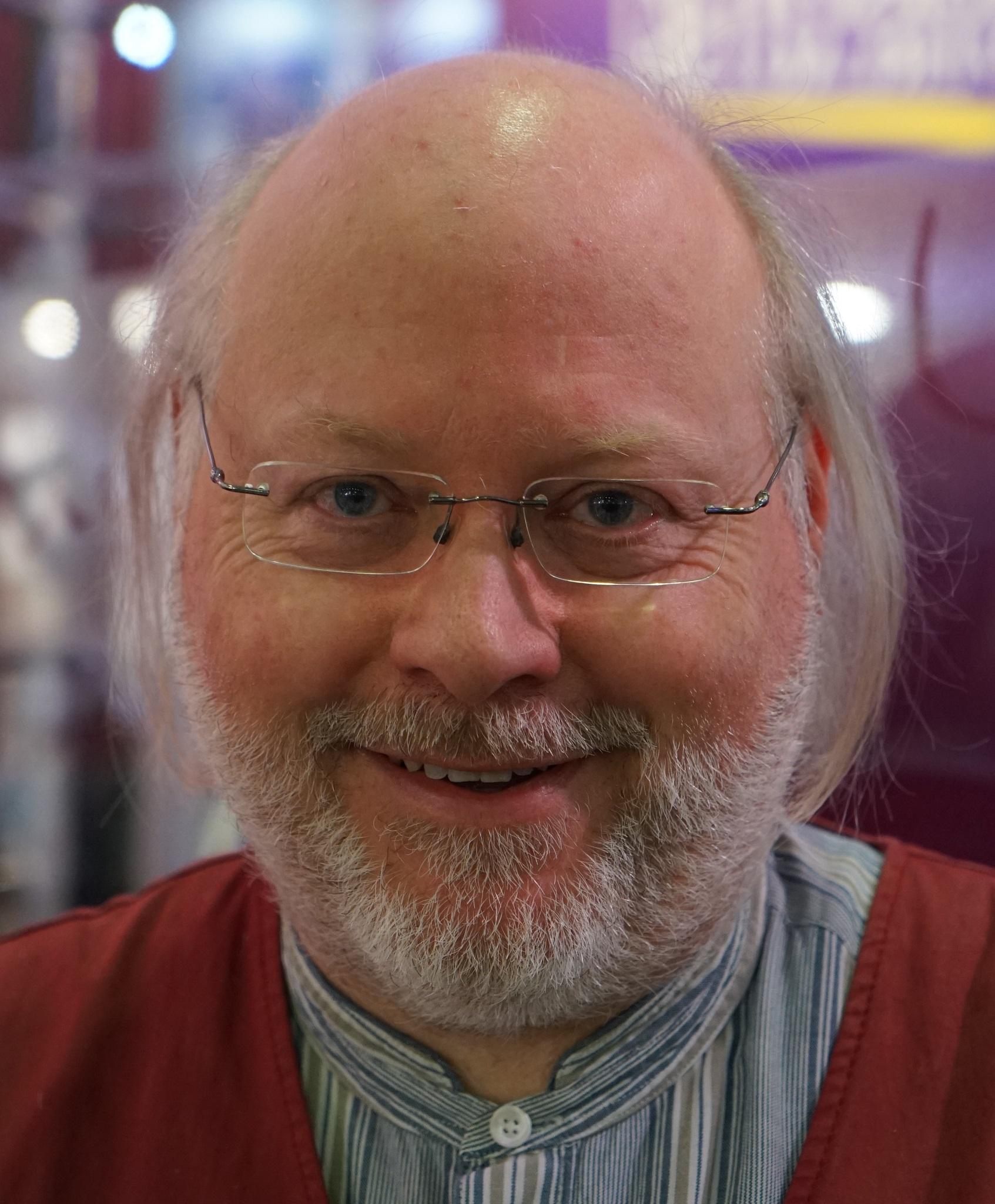
- Born: 1966 (age 59–60); Ratingen, Germany
- Education: University of Cologne
- Scientific career
- Workplaces: Hessisches Landesmuseum Darmstadt; University of Bonn; Technische Universität Darmstadt; University of Mannheim; Reiss Engelhorn Museum

Wilfried Rosendahl (born 1966) is a German bioarchaeologist, geoscientist, and cultural manager, general director of the Reiss-Engelhorn-Museums in Mannheim, and honorary professor at the Institute of History at the University of Mannheim.

== Life and education ==
Wilfried Rosendahl studied geology, paleontology, prehistory and early history, and zoology at the University of Cologne from 1986 to 1992. Directly after receiving his diploma in 1992, he began his doctoral studies, which he completed in 1994. While still a student, Rosendahl worked on various projects at museums and curated exhibitions on natural and cultural history topics.

From 1994 to 1996, Rosendahl completed a scientific traineeship at the Hessisches Landesmuseum in Darmstadt.

Building on his scientific work on the ice-age fauna of Central Europe, he worked from 1996 to 1998 on an EU project on the Pleistocene environment at the Institute of Paleontology at the University of Bonn. The topic of man, climate, and the environment with a special focus on caves and cave contents was the main focus of research as a research associate and assistant at the Institute for Applied Geosciences at the Technical University of Darmstadt from 1998 to 2003. In addition, Rosendahl continued to work as an external curator at various museums in Germany and abroad.

At the beginning of 2004, he moved to the museum complex of the Reiss-Engelhorn-Museen in Mannheim (rem) where he initially worked as a curator, head of collections, and head of the department. Since 2016, he was director for the area "Archaeology and World Cultures" and since 2017 deputy general director for the entire museum complex. In the summer of 2020, he was confirmed as Director-General for the rem and rem gGmbH Stiftungsmuseen, beginning 1 January 2021. Rosendahl succeeds Alfried Wieczorek. He is also Director of the Curt Engelhorn Center for Art and Cultural History, where he leads the German Mummy Project, a large, interdisciplinary, and internationally active mummy research project. Furthermore, Rosendahl is Chairman of the Board of the Curt-Engelhorn Foundation and the Blackberry Foundation at the Reiss-Engelhorn Museums, as well as Scientific Director and one of the Managing Directors of the Curt-Engelhorn-Zentrum Archäometrie gGmbH.

In his function as managing director of Museums Management Mannheim GmbH, he is responsible for passing on exhibitions of the Reiss-Engelhorn Museums to national and international museum partners. The focus of his teaching activities at the Institute of History at the University of Mannheim is on the topic of "knowledge transfer and museum practice" as well as the application of scientific methods in the historical sciences.

== Other commitments and memberships ==
- Member of the board of directors of the West and South German Association for Antiquities
- Member of the board of the Mannheimer Altertumsverein von 1859
- Member of the board of trustees of the Technoseum, Landesmuseum für Technik und Arbeit Mannheim
- Member of the Board of Trustees of Verein Kurpfalz e. V.
- Member of the board of the Institut Français Mannheim, Deutsch-Französisches Kulturzentrum in der Europäischen Metropolregion Rhein-Neckar e.V.
- Corresponding member of the Subcommission Quaternary of the German Stratigraphic Commission
- Member of the section GeoTopes and GeoParks of the German Geological Society - Geological Association (DGGV)
- Member of the Förderkreis Archäologie in Baden e. V.
- Member of the Working Group Cave & Karst Grabenstetten e.V.
- Member of the Association of Friends of Art, and Culture in Mining e.V.

== Publications ==
=== Monographs ===
- Rosendahl, W.; Darga, R.; Kühn, R.; Pacher, M (2000). Der Höhlenbär in Bayern. München: Verlag Dr. F. Pfeil. p. 48. ISBN 978-3-931516-82-6.
- Rosendahl, W.; Junker, B.; Megerle, A.; Vogt, J., eds. (2006). Wanderungen in die Erdgeschichte - Schwäbische Alb.- Wanderungen in die Erdgeschichte. München: Verlag Dr. Friedrich Pfeil. p. 16018. ISBN 978-3-89937-065-2.
- Wieczorek, A.; Rosendahl, W., eds. (2003). MenschenZeit - Geschichten vom Aufbruch der frühen Menschen. Mainz: Verlag Philipp von Zabern. p. 130. ISBN 978-3-8053-3132-6.
- Kempe, S.; Rosendahl, W., eds. (2008). Höhlen. Verborgene Welten. Darmstadt. p. 168.
- Rosendahl, W.; Schieber, M., eds. (2009). Der Stein der Schwaben - Natur- und Kulturgeschichte des Suevits. Stuttgart: Staatsanzeiger-Verl. p. 603. ISBN 978-3-929981-78-0.
- Wieczorek, A.; Rosendahl, W. (2010). Mummies of the World. Munich, New York. p. 384.
- Fiedler, L.; Rosendahl, G.; Rosendahl, W. (2011). Altsteinzeit von A - Z. Darmstadt: WBG. p. 415.
- Gill-Frerking, H.; Rosendahl, W.; Zink, A.; Alterauge, A., eds. (2014). Yearbook of Mummy Studies. München: Pfeil-Verlag. p. 1922.
- Wieczorek, A.; Rosendahl, W., eds. (2015). Mumien - der Traum vom ewigen Leben. Darmstadt: Zabern. p. 376. ISBN 978-3-8053-4939-0.
- Rosendahl, G.; Döppes, D.; Friedland, S.N.; Rosendahl, W. (2016). Eiszeit-Safari: Reisebegleiter. München: Verlag Dr. Friedrich Pfeil. p. 224. ISBN 978-3-89937-204-5.
- Rosendahl, W.; Madea, B., eds. (2017). Tatorte der Vergangenheit. Archäologie und Forensik. Darmstadt: Konrad Theiss Verlag. p. 144. ISBN 978-3-8062-3645-3.
- Busch, U.; Rosendahl, W., eds. (2019). Die Welt im Durchblick. Wunder moderner Röntgentechnik. Darmstadt. p. 160.
- Rosendahl, W.; Huth, T.; Junker, B.; Geyer, M.; Megerle, A., eds. (2019). Entlang des Rheins von Basel bis Mannheim.- Wanderungen in die Erdgeschichte. München. p. 16038. ISBN 978-3-89937-240-3.
- Kümper, H.; Rosendahl, W., eds. (2020). Unsterblichkeit – Traum oder Trauma. Oppenheim: Nünnerich-Asmus Verlag. p. 152. ISBN 978-3-96176-083-1.
- Busch, U.; Rosendahl, W., eds. (2020). Wilhelm Conrad Röntgen – den X-Strahlen auf der Spur. 50 Stätten zur Entdeckung, Geschichte, Anwendung der Röntgenstrahlen in Deutschland und Nachbarländern. Oppenheim: Nünnerich-Asmus Verlag. p. 136. ISBN 978-3-96176-137-1.
- Sui, C. W.; Herrmann, S.; Rosendahl, W. (2021). In 80 Bildern um die Welt - Reisefotografien aus dem 19. und 20. Jahrhundert. Oppenheim: Nünnerich-Asmus Verlag. p. 128. ISBN 978-3-96176-150-0.

=== Editions (publisher, co-editor or co-worker) ===
- Rosendahl, W. (2001). Zum Oberpleistozän in der hessischen Oberrheinebene - Geologie und Paläontologie. (Exkursion A am 17. April 2001). Vol. 83. Stuttgart. pp. 37–50.
- Rosendahl, W. (2002). Neues zur Altersstellung des fossilen Menschenschädels von Rhünda (Schwalm-Eder-Kreis), Hessen. Vol. 32. Mainz. pp. 15–19.
- Rosendahl, W.; Maureille, B.; Trinkaus, E. (2003). Rediscovery of the Badegoule 5 human skeletal remains. Le Lardin-Saint-Lazare, Dordogne, France: Badegoule. pp. 273–278.
- Burger, J.; Rosendahl, W.; Loreille, O.; Hemmer, H.; Eriksson, T.; Götherström, A.; Hiller, J.; Collins, M. J.; Wess, T.; Alt, K. W. (2004). Molecular phylogeny of the cave lion Panthera leo spelaea. Vol. 30. pp. 841–849.
- Rosendahl, W. (2005). Ulrich, H. (ed.). Le Moustier 3 - A second Le Moustier Neanderthal discovery by Otto Hauser. Vol. 12. Berlin. pp. 73–76.
- Rosendahl, G.; Beinhauer, K. W.; Löscher, M.; Kreipl, K.; Walter, R.; Rosendahl, W. (2006). Le plus vieil arc du monde? Une pièce intéressante en provenance de Mannheim, Allemagne. Vol. 110. Paris. pp. 371–382.
- Rosendahl, W.; Döppes, D.; Kempe, S. (2007). Sirocko, F.; Claussen, M.; Sànchez Goñi, M.F.; Litt, T. (eds.). MIS 5 - MIS 8 - Numerically dated palaeontological caves sites in Central Europe. Vol. 7. Amsterdam. pp. 455–470.
- Döppes, D.; Kempe, S.; Rosendahl, W. (2008). Dated Paleontological cave sites of Central Europe from Late Middle Pleistocene to early Upper Pleistocene (OIS 6 to OIS 8). Vol. 187. Amsterdam. pp. 97–104.
- Musshoff, F.; Rosendahl, W.; Madea, B. (2009). "Determination of nicotine in hair samples of pre-Columbian mummies". Forensic Science International. 185 (1–3). Amsterdam: 84–88. doi:10.1016/j.forsciint.2008.12.016. PMID 19201115.
- Stiller, M.; Baryshnikov, G.; Bocherens, H.; Grandal D'anglade; Hilpert, B.; Münzel, S.C.; Pinhasi, R.; Rabeder, G.; Rosendahl, W.; Trinkaus, E.; Hofreiter, M.; Knapp, M. (2010). Withering away - 25,000 years of genetic decline preceded cave bear extinction. Vol. 27. Oxford. pp. 975–978. doi:10.1093/molbev/msq083. PMID 20335279.
- Gill-Frerking, H.; Rosendahl, W. (2011). Use of Computed Tomography and Three-Dimensional Virtual Reconstruction for the Examination of a 16th Century Mummified Dog from a North German Peat Bog.
- Joger, U.; Rosendahl, W. (2012). The Rübeland Caves (Harz Mts.) - Historical excavations and modern analyses. Vol. 11. Braunschweig. pp. 55–68.
- Stiller, S.; Molak, M.; Prost, S.; Rohland, N.; Pacher, M.; Rabeder, G.; Baryshnikov, G.; Rosendahl, W.; Münzel, S.; Bocherens, H.; Grandal-D'anglade, A.; Hilpert, B.; Germonpre, M.; Stasyk, O.; Pinhasi, R.; Tintori, A.; Ho, S.; Hofreiter, M.; Knapp, M. (2013). Mitochondrial DNA diversity and evolution of the Pleistocene cave bear complex.
- Döppes, D.; Rosendahl, W. (2014). Vom 3D-Scann bis zum 3D-Druck - Allgemeine Grundlagen und Praxisbeispiele aus dem Museumbereich. Vol. 60. Bremen. pp. 36–43.
- Rosendahl, W.; Orschiedt, J.; Baales, M. (2014). Wiederentdeckt! Die jungpaläolithischen" Menschenreste aus der Honert-Höhle bei Balve. Münster. pp. 16–20.
- Sydler, C.; Öhrström, L.; Rosendahl, W.; Woitek, U.; Rühli, F. (2015). "CT-based assessment of relative soft tissue alteration in different types of ancient mummies". The Anatomical Record. 298 (6). New York: 1162–1174. doi:10.1002/ar.23144. PMID 25998649. S2CID 205412453.
- Zesch, S.; Panzer, S.; Rosendahl, W.; Schoenberg, O.; Henzler, T. (2016). From first to latest imaging technology: Revisiting the first mummy investigated with X-ray in 1896 by using dual-energy computed tomography. Vol. 3. London. pp. 172–181.
- Drucker, D.; Rosendahl, W.; Van Neer, W.; Görner, I.; Bocherens, H. (2016). Environment and subsistence in northwestern Europe during the Younger Dryas: an isotopic study of the human of Rhünda (Germany). Vol. 6. London. pp. 690–699.
- Hajdua, T.; György-Toronyic, A.; Pap, I.; Rosendahl, W.; Szabó, G. (2016). Anthropological and archaeological data to the chronology and meaning of the Transdanubian encrusted pottery decoration. Vol. 91. Berlin. pp. 353–368.
- Paijmans, J. L. A.; Barlow, A.; Förster, D. W.; Henneberger, K.; Meyer, M.; Nickel, B.; Nagel, D.; Havmøller, R. W.; Baryshnikov, G.F.; Joger, U.; Rosendahl, W.; Hofreiter, M. (2018). istorical biogeography of the leopard (Panthera pardus) and its extinct Eurasian Populations.
- Jellinghaus, K.; Urban, P. K.; Hachmann, C.; Bohnert, M.; Hotz, G.; Rosendahl, W.; Wittwer-Backofen, U. (2019). "Collagen degradation as a possibility to determine the post-mortem interval (PMI) of human bones in a forensic context – A survey". Legal Medicine. 36. London: 96–102. doi:10.1016/j.legalmed.2018.11.009. PMID 30500672. S2CID 54485034.
- Stanton, D. W. G.; Federica Alberti, F.; Plotniko, V.; Androsov, S.; Grigoriev, S.; Fedorov, S.; Kosintsev, P.; Nagel, D.; Vartanyan, S.; Barnett, R.; Ersmark, E.; Döppes, D.; Germonpré, M.; Hofreiter, M.; Rosendahl, W.; Skoglund. P.; Dalén, L. (2020). "Early-Pleistocene origin and extensive intra-species diversity of the extinct cave lion". Scientific Reports. 10 (1): 12621. Bibcode:2020NatSR..1012621S. doi:10.1038/s41598-020-69474-1. PMC 7387438. PMID 32724178.
- Bego-Ghina, B.; Rosendahl, W. (2020). Thomsen-Fürst, R. (ed.). Wenn der Himmel zürnt – Wetterphänomene in der Zeit von Leopold Mozart mit einem besonderen Blick auf Gewitter, Blitzschlag und Brandbekämpfung. Vol. 3. Heidelberg. pp. 157–172.
- Panzer, S.; Augat, P.; Sprenger, M.; Zesch, S.; Rosendahl, W.; Sutherland. M. L.; Thompson, R.C.; Palading, A.; Zink, A. (2021). For the EURAC and HORUS Study Teams (2021): Correlation of atherosclerosis and osteoarthritis in ancient Egypt: A standardized evaluation of 45 whole-body CT examinations. Vol. 33. London. pp. 137–145.
