= Paul J. Heald =

American novelist and law professor

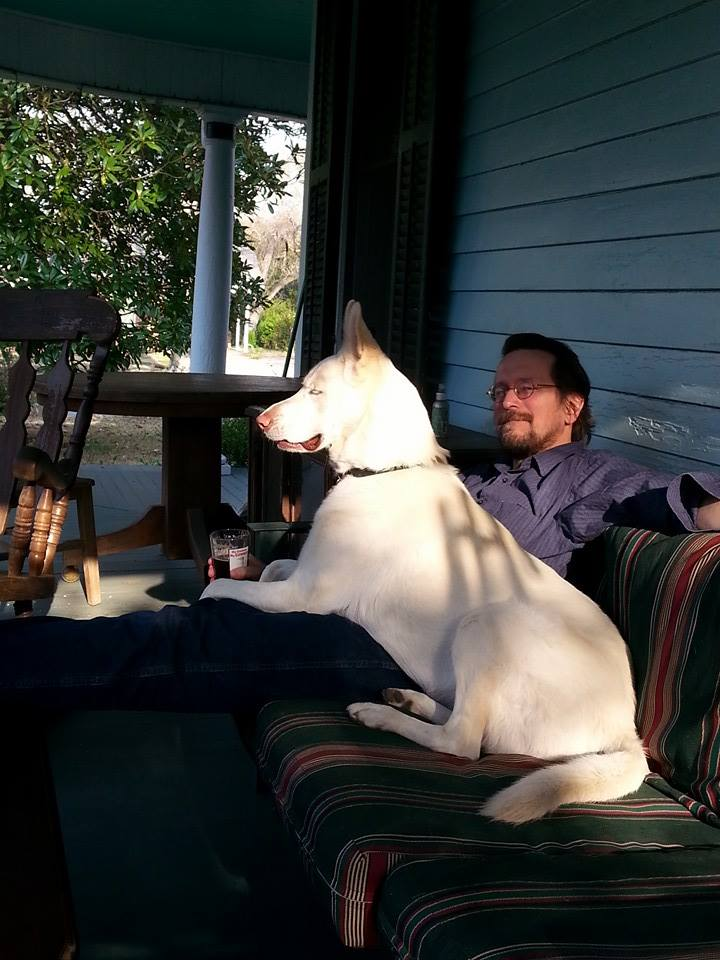
- Paul J. Heald and Wilbur the Dog
- Born: April 19, 1957 (age 69); Evanston, Illinois, U.S.
- Education: University of Illinois (BA, MA); University of Chicago (JD)
- Employer: University of Illinois
- Known for: Mystery Fiction; Intellectual Property; Empirical Legal Studies
- Spouse: Jill A. Crandall (m. 1984)

Paul J. Heald (born April 19, 1959) is an American novelist and law professor, best known for his murder mysteries and his empirical studies of the public domain in copyright law. His fiction is published by Skyhorse Publishing, and he is currently the Richard W. & Marie L. Corman Research Professor at the University of Illinois College of Law.

Heald is the author of three novels, two books on Law and Literature, and over 50 scholarly articles and book chapters, mostly on intellectual property law. He is also a Fellow & Associated Researcher, CREATe, RCUK Centre for Copyright, University of Glasgow.

== Biography ==
Heald was born in Evanston, Illinois, to Jame E. Heald, a professor, and Phyllis A. Heald (née Kosir), a homemaker. He has one sister, Laura Filuta (born 1960). He was valedictorian of DeKalb High School in 1977, two years after National Book Award winner Richard Powers (1975) and seven years before super-model Cindy Crawford (1984) received the same honor from the same school. His favorite high school memory involves John Pauley and Regan Pourchot. He attended the University of Illinois as a Comparative Literature major and was a varsity epée fencer on two Big Ten championship teams, placing 4th in the Conference and 18th in the nation at the 1981 NCAA fencing finals.

After college, Heald taught English at Florida A & M University, a historically African-American institution, and attended law school at the University of Chicago. He married Amasong Choir director Jill A. Crandall in 1984. After law school he clerked during the 1988-89 judicial term for the Honorable Frank M. Johnson, Jr., a well-known jurist portrayed by Martin Sheen in the 2014 movie Selma. He taught intellectual property law at the University of Georgia Law School from 1989 to 2011 and was the youngest professor there to ever have been granted an endowed chair, the Allen Post Professorship.

== Published works ==
=== Fiction ===
Heald has written four novels which constitute The Clarkeston Chronicles: Death in Eden (2014), Cotton (2016), Courting Death and Georgia Requiem (not yet scheduled for release).

=== Non-fiction ===
In The Atlantic, Rebecca Rosen featured Heald's best-known copyright research entitled: "The Hole in Our Collective Memory: How Copyright Made Mid-Century Books Vanish." The graph to the right summarizes his findings on the effect of copyright on the availability of a random sample of fiction and non-fiction titles on Amazon.

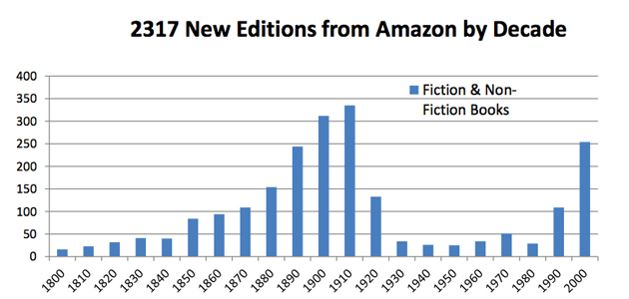
2317 New Editions from Amazon by Decade

The large upswing in availability is attributed to the fact that all works published in the US before 1923 are in the public domain, which attracts new publishers. The large dip for mid-century books is caused by the continued enforceability of copyrights in newer titles. In this, and several other papers, he has demonstrated that copyright lacks the positive effect prediction by some economists: Copyright actually diminishes access to books. The same research was the subject of Bob Garfield's National Public Radio Program, On the Media.

In another well-known study, Heald and his co-authors estimate the value of public domain images on Wikipedia to be in excess of $200 million per year. Heald's empirical research with Susannah Chapman on the effect of patents on crop diversity has also been influential. As described in Science Daily: "Law professor Paul Heald says overall varietal diversity of the $20 billion market for vegetable crops and apples in the U.S. actually has increased over the past 100 years, a finding that should change the highly politicized debate over intellectual property policy." Heald and Chapman compared crop varieties sold in commercial seed and nurserymen's catalogs in 1903–04 with those available in 2004 and found no significant decrease in crop diversity.

In a 1993 paper published in the Journal of Intellectual Property Law, Heald explored remedies for copyfraud, suggesting that payment demands for spurious copyrights might be resisted in civil lawsuits under a number of commerce-law theories: (1) Breach of warranty of title; (2) unjust enrichment; (3) fraud; and (4) false advertising.
