= Copyright misuse =

Affirmative defense to copyright infringement

Copyright misuse is an equitable defence to copyright infringement in the United States based upon the doctrine of unclean hands. The misuse doctrine provides that the copyright holder engaged in abusive or improper conduct in exploiting or enforcing the copyright will be precluded from enforcing his rights against the infringer. Copyright misuse is often comparable to and draws from the older and more established doctrine of patent misuse, which bars a patentee from obtaining relief for infringement when he extends his patent rights beyond the limited monopoly conferred by the law.

The doctrine forbids the copyright holder from attempting to extend the effect or operation of copyright beyond the scope of the statutory right, for example, by engaging in restrictive licensing practices that are contrary to the public policy underlying copyright law. In fact, the misuse doctrine is said to have evolved to tackle such aggressive licensing practices.

== Requirements ==
Although the doctrine of copyright misuse has not yet been delineated, several circuits have upheld the defence on the following policy grounds –

1. The plaintiff has violated antitrust laws
2. The plaintiff used the copyright in a manner violative of the public policy of copyright law

== Difference from fair use ==
Fair use defence to copyright infringement allows unauthorised use of copyrighted work in a reasonable manner under certain circumstances. The following are some of the facets that distinguish the misuse doctrine from fair use –

1. Fair use is statutorily recognised in 17 USC § 107, whereas copyright misuse is yet to receive statutory support; and
2. The defendant must prove that his unauthorised use of copyrighted work qualifies for a fair use exception, whereas the defendant need not suffer directly from the misuse to successfully claim an exception to copyright infringement.

== In the United States ==
Although the misuse doctrine was a well-known defence in patent infringement cases, it was extended to copyright law in M. Witmark & Sons v Jensen for the first time. Consequently, copyright misuse was adopted by various circuit courts in recent years. However, the contours of the doctrine remain uncertain as it is yet to be explicitly recognised by the United States Supreme Court. Some scholars have even advocated for the codification of the misuse doctrine.

=== Lasercomb America, Inc. v Reynolds ===
In Lasercomb America, Inc. v Reynolds, the Fourth Circuit became the first appellate court to uphold a copyright misuse defence as analogous to the patent misuse defence. In this case, Lasercomb had sued Reynolds for making unauthorised copies of its die-making software, which was subject to copyright protection. Reynolds alleged that Lasercomb had misused its copyright by imposing unreasonable non-compete clause that restricted creating a competing product for a period of one hundred years in its standard licensing agreement. The Court ruled that although the inclusion of such a provision did not constitute an antitrust violation, it did violate the public policy underlying copyright and rendered Lasercomb’s copyright unenforceable. The Court also held that the defendant need not be subjected to the purported misuse in order to set up a valid defence as Reynolds had not signed the standard licensing agreement. Lastly, the Court clarified that Lasercomb was free to initiate a suit for infringement once it has purged itself of the misuse and its copyright was not invalidated.

=== Practice Management Information Corp. v American Medical Association ===
The Ninth Circuit was the next circuit to adopt the copyright misuse doctrine in Practice Management Information Corp. v American Medical Association. In this case, American Medical Association granted Health Care Financing Administration (now known as the Centers for Medicare & Medicaid Services) a non-exclusive, royalty-free perpetual license to use its coding system for medical procedures. However, the license was restricted, as no other coding system could be used. Practice Management, a publisher and distributor of medical books, filed for declaratory relief to have the copyright invalidated when it failed to procure the volume discount it requested. The Court refused to invalidate the copyright but ruled that the licensing provision requiring exclusive use of the coding system constituted copyright misuse.

=== Alcatel USA Inc. v DGI Technologies Inc. ===
The Fifth Circuit upheld the defence of copyright misuse in Alcatel USA, Inc. v DGI Technologies, Inc. Alcatel licensed the use of its software only along with its manufactured equipment. The terms of the license banned downloading or copying Alcatel’s software. However, DGI downloaded and copied Alcatel’s software in violation of the licensing agreement in order to ensure compatibility with its product. In a suit for infringement of copyright, DGI claimed misuse of copyright by Alcatel. The Court found Alcatel to have exceeded the scope of the copyright grant to gain an extended monopoly, which effectively constituted a copyright misuse.

=== Assessment Technologies of WI, LLC v WIREdata Inc. ===
The doctrine of copyright misuse was upheld by the Seventh Circuit in Assessment Technologies of WI, LLC v WIREdata Inc, which is another case involving computer software. In this case, WIREdata sought public information about a number of properties from the Wisconsin municipalities. The information was collected by the municipalities and compiled using the plaintiff’s software for tax assessment purposes. Hence, some municipalities refused to furnish the information for fear of infringing Assessment Technologies’ copyright. WIREdata, the defendants in this case, sued in state court for the release of information and Assessment Technologies sued in federal court, claiming that the release would violate its copyright. The Court held that the conduct of the plaintiff amounted to copyright misuse as the information withheld by the municipalities were beyond the purview of the said copyright.

=== Video Pipeline, Inc. v Buena Vista Home Entertainment, Inc. ===
In Video Pipeline, Inc. v Buena Vista Home Entertainment, Inc., the Third Circuit stated that a copyright holder might commit misuse in trying to enforce a license that prohibits criticism of copyright-protected works. Video Pipeline had an agreement with Disney, which allowed it to compile more than 500 movie trailers. When Video Pipeline started to post the trailers online, Disney asked Video Pipeline to remove the trailers, as they were not covered by the terms of the license. Although Video Pipeline complied with Disney’s request, it sought a declaratory relief that its use of trailers online did not in any manner violate Disney’s copyright. Additionally, Video Pipeline amended the complaint to seek declaratory relief to use a two-minute video clip review it created out of sixty-two movies. Disney, which owned Buena Vista, filed a counterclaim for copyright infringement in response to the suit. The Court observed that the doctrine is yet to be affirmatively expressed by the United States Supreme Court and that the licensing terms were reasonable. Accordingly, the Court ultimately ruled that the doctrine was inapplicable to the factual matrix of this case.

This case has assumed significance because it was decided in a circuit wherein Redbox sued three major studios, namely Universal, Walter and Fox.

== In India ==
India has incorporated fair dealing provisions into its domestic law, which provides important limitations to copyright holders’ rights. The doctrine of copyright misuse has not received any statutory support much like in the United States.

=== Tekla Corporation v Survo Ghosh ===
In Tekla Corporation and Ors. v Survo Ghosh and Ors., the Delhi High Court ruled that the defence of copyright misuse was not available to the defendants either in a suit for permanent injunction from infringing a plaintiff’s copyright or in an action for damages for copyright infringement. In 2011, the plaintiffs had initiated a suit for copyright infringement against the defendants for unauthorized usage of its software. Instead of invoking any of the exemptions under Section 52 of the Indian Copyright Act, 1957, the defendants contested that the plaintiffs were precluded from claiming remedies for infringement as their conduct constituted copyright misuse. It was alleged that the plaintiffs had been charging an exorbitant fee alongside imposing ‘unreasonable' conditions as a part of their licensing agreements. However, the Court was not persuaded by the American jurisprudence on this subject and refused to recognize the doctrine of copyright misuse, as it would amount to adding more grounds than what the statute already provided. The Court was also concerned about the implications of the doctrine on judicial delays in enforcement of copyright if it were to be adopted in India. Nonetheless, the Court is said to have missed an opportunity to engage with copyright policy prevalent in India.

== See also ==
- Censorship by copyright
- Copyfraud
- Kai Puolamäki, activist against copyright misuse in Finland
- Patent misuse
