= National Portrait Gallery and Wikimedia Foundation copyright dispute =

2009 legal dispute

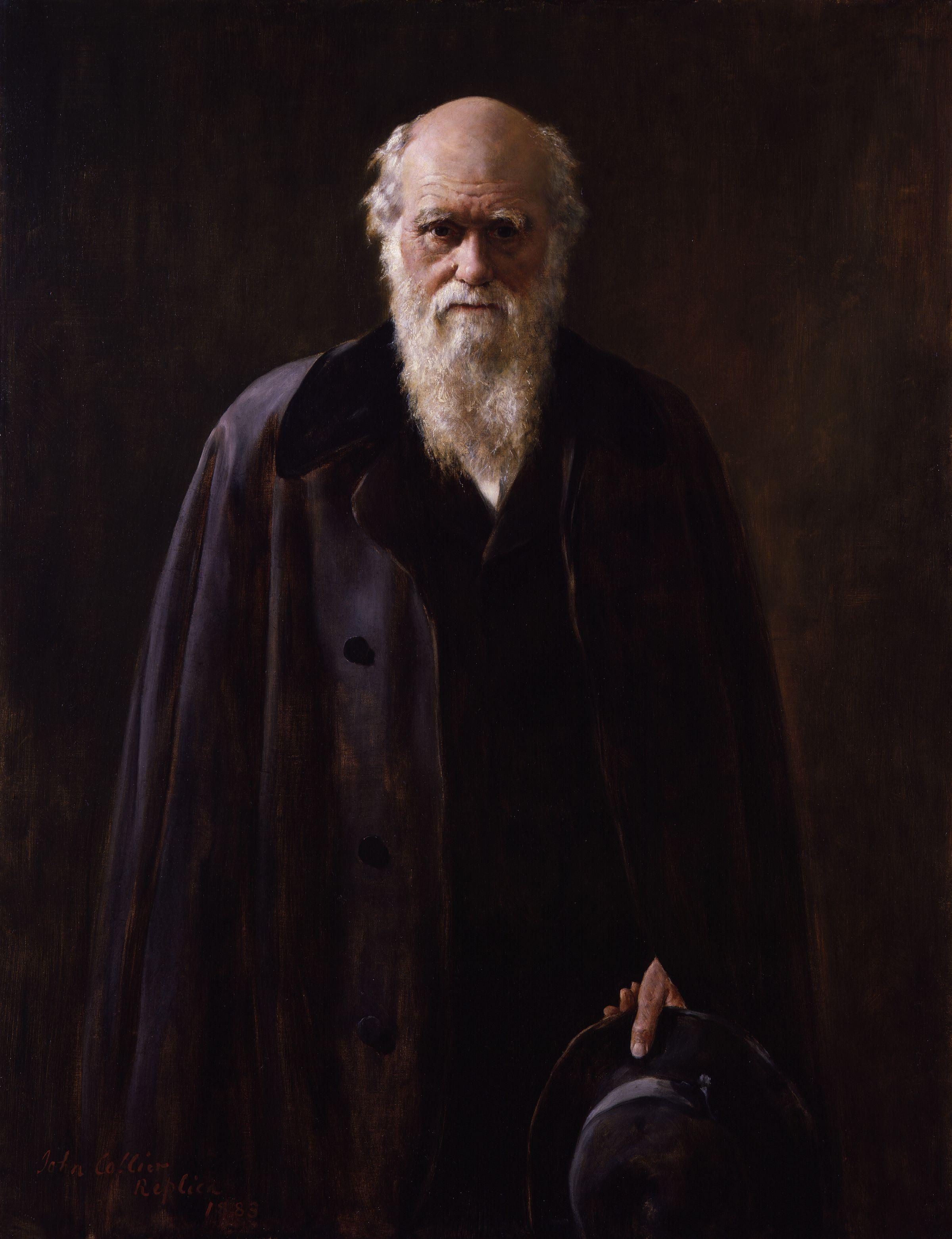
Charles Darwin, by John Collier (1883), one of the images uploaded by Coetzee from the National Portrait Gallery's digital collection

In July 2009, lawyers representing the British National Portrait Gallery (NPG) sent an email letter warning of possible legal action for alleged copyright infringement to Derrick Coetzee, a former editor and administrator of the free content multimedia repository Wikimedia Commons, hosted by the Wikimedia Foundation (WMF), after Coetzee uploaded more than 3,300 high-resolution images of artworks, taken from the NPG website, to Wikimedia Commons.

The NPG accepted that the artworks depicted were in the public domain, but contended that they owned exclusive rights to their reproductions, demanding that they be removed from Wikimedia Commons. The images were not deleted and, following criticism of the NPG's stance from the Wikimedia Foundation and the Electronic Frontier Foundation, the NPG did not pursue the matter further.

An unrelated 2023 Court of Appeal judgement clarified that in England and Wales no new copyright is created in making a photographic reproduction of a two-dimensional public domain artwork. The NPG website continues to assert ownership of copyright.

== NPG claims ==
In 2009, a letter sent by the representatives of Britain's National Portrait Gallery stated that Derrick Coetzee had downloaded more than 3,300 high-resolution images from the gallery's database of images and had posted them for re-use on Wikimedia Commons.

The NPG letter stated the claim that while the painted portraits may be in the public domain, the high-quality photographic reproductions are recent works, and qualify as copyrighted works due to the amount of work it took to digitize and restore them, that the action of uploading the images infringed on both the NPG's database rights and copyrights, and that the images were obtained through the circumvention of technical measures used to prevent downloading of the prints. The NPG also stated that the public availability of the images would affect revenue acquired from licensing the images to third parties, revenue also used to fund the project of digitizing their collection, an effort that the NPG claims cost the organization over 1,000,000 pounds sterling. The NPG had requested a response from Coetzee by 20 July 2009, and requested that the images be removed from the site, but noted that the NPG was not considering any legal action against the Wikimedia Foundation. The NPG announced that Coetzee had responded via his legal representative by the requested deadline. Coetzee's legal representation was provided by the Electronic Frontier Foundation.

Coetzee publicly posted a copy of the legal letter from the NPG, indicating that he desired to "enable public discourse on the issue". On 17 July 2009, NPG gallery spokesperson Eleanor Macnair stated that "contact has now been made" with the Wikimedia Foundation and "we remain hopeful that a dialogue will be possible." The NPG has stated that it would be willing to permit Wikipedia to use low-resolution images, and that it hoped to avoid taking any further legal action. The NPG had previously attempted to contact the Wikimedia Foundation in April 2009 regarding this issue, but did not receive an immediate response.

The British Association of Picture Libraries and Agencies (BAPLA), an image industry trade group, expressed support for the gallery.

In early 2010, an NPG spokesperson reported to Heise Open, a division of German publishing house Heinz Heise, "We had a constructive discussion in December and are now considering how best to come to an agreement." In November 2010, Tom Morgan, Head of Rights and Reproductions at the National Portrait Gallery addressed a conference attended by both Wikipedians and representatives of cultural institutions. Morgan's presentation was entitled "Wikipedia and the National Portrait Gallery – A bad first date? A perspective on the developing relationship between Wikipedia and cultural heritage organisations".

== Background ==
The 1999 United States District Court case Bridgeman Art Library v. Corel Corp. (in which Bridgeman Art Library sued the Corel Corporation for copyright infringement for distributing copies of digital reproductions of public domain paintings sourced from Bridgeman on a CD-ROM) established that "a photograph which is no more than a copy of a work of another as exact as science and technology permits lacks originality. That is not to say that such a feat is trivial, simply not original." As a result, reproductions of works that have fallen into the public domain cannot attract any new copyright in the United States. As such, local policies of the Wikimedia Commons web site ignore any potential copyright that could subsist in reproductions of public domain works.

However, British case law can take into account the amount of skill and labour that took place in the creation of a work for considering whether it can be copyrighted in that country. The letter from the National Portrait Gallery demands that the case should be heard in the UK under UK law and not in the US under US law. The issue of jurisdiction is complicated as the National Portrait Gallery is located in the United Kingdom, but Wikimedia Commons, and the uploader, are both located within the United States. The letter also claims that by making the images freely available on Wikimedia Commons, Coetzee would also be liable under the British Copyright, Designs and Patents Act 1988 for any copyright infringement committed by other users who download and use the images.

== Reaction ==
=== Response by the Wikimedia Foundation ===
Erik Möller, deputy director of the Wikimedia Foundation, made a statement on the issue, clarifying the stance of the Wikimedia Foundation on the incident. Möller stated that although the NPG agreed that the images are in the public domain, the NPG had contended that they own the exclusive rights to their reproductions of the images, using this to monetize their collection and assert control over public domain content. Möller also stated "It is hard to see a plausible argument that excluding public domain content from a free, non-profit encyclopaedia serves any public interest whatsoever." He further described agreements that other cultural institutions had made with Wikipedia to disseminate images: two German photographic archives donated 350,000 copyrighted images, and other institutions in the United States and the UK have made material available for use. The NPG stated that the images released by the German archives were medium resolution images, and that the NPG had offered to share images of the same quality. A reporter for the BBC stated that in 2008, the NPG earned a total of £339,000 (equivalent to £552,647 in 2025) from licensing images for use in books and magazines.

=== Response by the EFF ===
Fred von Lohmann, an attorney with the Electronic Frontier Foundation (EFF), remarked that the situation comes down to asking whether US companies and citizens would be "bound by the most restrictive copyright law anywhere on the planet, or by U.S. law?" In a legal analysis, Lohmann contended that under US law, the NPG's "browse wrap" contract was not enforceable, database rights are not implemented at all, and that "using Zoomify on public domain images doesn't get you a DMCA claim." Lohmann also observed:

NPG seems to think that UK law should apply everywhere on the Internet. If that's right, then the same could be said for other, more restrictive copyright laws, as well (see, e.g., Mexico's copyright term of life of the author plus 100 years and France's copyright over fashion designs). That would leave the online world at the mercy of the worst that foreign copyright laws have to offer, an outcome no U.S. court has ever endorsed.

== Current licensing ==
In 2012, the National Portrait Gallery licensed 53,000 low-resolution images under a Creative Commons Attribution-NonCommercial-NoDerivatives license, making them available free of charge for non-commercial use, although not suitable for Wikimedia Commons or Wikipedia. A further 87,000 high-resolution images are available for academic use under the Gallery's own license that invites donations in return; previously, the Gallery charged for high-resolution images.

By 2012, 100,000 images, around a third of the Gallery's collection, had been digitized.

In November 2015, the United Kingdom's Intellectual Property Office clarified in an informational document that, based on the opinion of the European Court of Justice, "copyright can only subsist in subject matter that is original in the sense that it is the author's own 'intellectual creation'. Given this criterion, it seems unlikely that what is merely a retouched, digitised image of an older work can be considered as 'original'."

As of March 2026, the NPG still displays a "© National Portrait Gallery, London" notice next to images such as the Darwin portrait shown above, claiming that they are only licensed by them for "limited non-commercial use", and displaying fees and terms for academic or commercial use. The Wikimedia Foundation continues to host the images, with notices saying (e.g. in the Darwin case) "The author died in 1934, so this work is in the public domain in its country of origin and other countries and areas where the copyright term is the author's life plus 80 years or fewer."

The collection at Wikimedia Commons appeared to encourage sales by NPG: according to Andrea Wallace, "Rather than damaging their profitability, the NPG reported 36/50 of the top selling images from 2010–2015 came from these".

== THJ v Sheridan ==
A November 2023 Court of Appeal judgement clarified that, in England and Wales, no new copyright is created in making a photographic reproduction of a two-dimensional public domain artwork, and that this has been the case since 2009.

== See also ==
- Copyfraud
- Copyright law of the United Kingdom
- Copyright law of the United States
- Sweat of the brow
- LICRA v. Yahoo!, a French court case involving the subjection of a primarily US-based web site to French law
- Bridgeman Art Library v. Corel Corp., decision on the status of reproductions of public-domain images in the US
