= Online Policy Group v. Diebold, Inc. =

- Court: United States District Court for the Northern District of California
- Full case name: Online Policy Group (OPG), Nelson Chu Pavlosky, and Luke Thomas Smith v. Diebold, Incorporated and Diebold Election Systems, Incorporated
- Decided: September 30, 2004
- Docket nos.: 5:03-cv-04913
- Citations: 337 F. Supp. 2d 1195; 72 U.S.P.Q.2d 1200

Court membership
- Judge sitting: Jeremy Fogel

Online Policy Group v. Diebold, Inc., 337 F. Supp. 2d 1195 (N.D. Cal. 2004), was a lawsuit involving an archive of Diebold's (now Premier Election Solutions) internal company e-mails and Diebold's contested copyright claims over them. The Electronic Frontier Foundation and the Stanford Cyberlaw Clinic provided pro bono legal support for the non-profit ISP and the Swarthmore College students, respectively.

United States District Judge Jeremy Fogel ruled that the plaintiffs' publishing of the e-mails was clearly a fair use essentially "because there was no commercial harm and no diminishment of value of the works" in their republication. Additionally Diebold was found to have misrepresented its copyright controls over the work, putting them in violation of section 512(f) of the Digital Millennium Copyright Act (DMCA) and leaving them liable for court costs and damages. This was the first time 512(f) had been enforced in court, and set a precedent.

== Background ==
Sometime in the spring of 2003 an unknown hacker broke into Diebold computers and obtained a large portion of their email archives, which was posted to various web sites. In an effort to quash the dissemination of information about security flaws in its voting machines, Diebold had sent dozens of DMCA takedown notices to various ISPs, all of which complied, except for OPG. Diebold sent takedown notices not only to sites actually storing the information, but also to those that merely linked to it. More specifically, Diebold sent DMCA notices to Swarthmore College, the ISP where the two students Nelson Pavlosky and Luke Smith had posted the 15,000 emails on their Swarthmore Coalition for the Digital Commons web page. Diebold also sent notices to the Online Policy Group, the ISP for an IndyMedia site linking to Pavlosky & Smith's web page, and also to Hurricane Electric, OPG's upstream provider. After Swarthmore complied and removed the material, Pavlosky, Smith and the OPG sued Diebold, "asserting the company's accusation of infringement "was based on knowing material misrepresentation," an actionable claim under a provision of the DMCA (17 U.S.C. 512(f)) and, furthermore, "interfered with [the] contractual relations" between the students and their Internet service providers". Although Diebold withdrew their DMCA letters after a media backlash, the plaintiffs decided to pursue Diebold in court; before the trial, EFF's legal director Cindy Cohn said that "We think it's important that the court make it clear that if you misuse the powers the DMCA has granted copyright holders, there are going to be serious consequences."

The OPG is a free, donation-based web host run by Roger Klorese, David Weekly, and Will Doherty; it was hosting the website for SF Bay Area Indymedia (Indybay) when a story linking to the Diebold e-mail archive was posted to Indybay. The link was not a direct link to the e-mail archive: upon reaching the linked page, the reader had to click another link to download the memos themselves. Diebold sent legal threats to OPG, asserting that the memos were copyrighted and that Indybay was committing tertiary infringement by linking to a link to the Diebold memos. When Indymedia and OPG refused to act, Diebold sent legal threats to OPG's upstream ISP, Hurricane Electric (HE), effectively accusing HE of quaternary copyright infringement.

== Verdict ==
Judge Fogel noted that Diebold's filing contained contradictory elements, and on the matter of fair use determined that:

The purpose, character, nature of the use, and the effect of the use upon the potential market for or value of the copyrighted work all indicate that at least part of the email archive is not protected by copyright law. The email archive was posted or hyperlinked to for the purpose of informing the public about the problems associated with Diebold's electronic voting machines. It is hard to imagine a subject the discussion of which could be more in the public interest. If Diebold's machines in fact do tabulate voters' preferences incorrectly, the very legitimacy of elections would be suspect. Moreover, Diebold has identified no specific commercial purpose or interest affected by publication of the email archive, and there is no evidence that such publication actually had or may have any effect on the putative market value, if any, of Diebold's allegedly copyrighted material. Even if it is true that portions of the email archive have commercial value, there is no evidence that Plaintiffs have attempted or intended to sell copies of the email archive for profit. Publishing or hyperlinking to the email archive did not prevent Diebold from making a profit from the content of the archive because there is no evidence that Diebold itself intended to or could profit from such content. At most, Plaintiffs' activity might have reduced Diebold's profits because it helped inform potential customers of problems with the machines. However, copyright law is not designed to prevent such an outcome. See, e.g., Acuff-Rose, 510 U.S. at 591-92. Rather, the goal of copyright law is to protect creative works in order to promote their creation. To the extent that Diebold argues that publication of the entire email archive diminished the value of some of its proprietary software or systems information, it must be noted that there is no evidence that Plaintiffs published or linked to the archive in order to profit. Finally, Plaintiffs' and IndyMedia's use was transformative: they used the email archive to support criticism that is in the public interest, not to develop electronic voting technology. Accordingly, there is no genuine issue of material fact that Diebold, through its use of the DMCA, sought to and did in fact suppress publication of content that is not subject to copyright protection.

He then concluded that "Diebold violated section 512(f)" of the DMCA:

[T]he Court concludes as a matter of law that Diebold knowingly materially misrepresented that Plaintiffs infringed Diebold's copyright interest, at least with respect to the portions of the email archive clearly subject to the fair use exception. No reasonable copyright holder could have believed that the portions of the email archive discussing possible technical problems with Diebold's voting machines were protected by copyright, and there is no genuine issue of fact that Diebold knew—and indeed that it specifically intended [FN15: Indeed, Diebold's counsel stated that "the DMCA provides the rapid response, the rapid remedies that Congress had in mind."]—that its letters to OPG and Swarthmore would result in prevention of publication of that content. The misrepresentations were material in that they resulted in removal of the content from websites and the initiation of the present lawsuit. The fact that Diebold never actually brought suit against any alleged infringer suggests strongly that Diebold sought to use the DMCA's safe harbor provisions—which were designed to protect ISPs, not copyright holders—as a sword to suppress publication of embarrassing content rather than as a shield to protect its intellectual property.

Consequently, Diebold was ordered to pay $125,000 in damages.

The failure to consider fair use before sending a DMCA notice was also found to compromise its good faith nature in Lenz v. Universal Music Corp. (2008). OPG v. Diebold is also used as a textbook illustration of four-factor analysis (of fair use) alongside Sony Corp. of America v. Universal City Studios, Inc. and MGM v. Grokster.
