= Lenz v. Universal Music Corp. =

U.S. District Court copyright case

- Court: United States Court of Appeals for the Ninth Circuit
- Full case name: Lenz v. Universal Music Corp.
- Decided: September 14, 2015
- Citation: 801 F.3d 1126 (2015)

Case history
- Prior actions: Cross-motions for summary judgment denied, 2013 U.S. Dist. LEXIS 9799 (N.D. Cal. 2013)
- Subsequent actions: Opinion amended, 815 F.3d 1145 (9th Cir. 2016); cert. denied, Lenz v. 137 S.Ct. 2263 (2017)

Holding
- Copyright holders must consider fair use in good faith before issuing takedown notices for content posted on the internet.

Court membership
- Judges sitting: Milan Dale Smith, Richard Charles Tallman, Mary Helen Murguia

Keywords
- Fair use, Online Copyright Infringement Liability Limitation Act

Lenz v. Universal Music Corp., 801 F.3d 1126 (9th Cir. 2015), is a decision by the United States Court of Appeals for the Ninth Circuit, holding that copyright owners must consider fair use defenses and good faith activities by alleged copyright infringers before issuing takedown notices for content posted on the Internet.

== Background ==
In February 2007, Stephanie Lenz posted on YouTube a 29-second clip of her 13-month-old son dancing to the Prince song "Let's Go Crazy". The audio was of poor quality, and the song was audible for about 20 of the 29 seconds. The total length of the original song is more than four minutes. In June 2007, Universal Music Corp., the copyright holder for "Let's Go Crazy", sent YouTube a takedown notice as enabled by the Digital Millennium Copyright Act (DMCA), claiming that the video was a copyright violation built upon an unauthorized copy of the song.

YouTube removed the video, and notified Lenz of the removal and the infringement accusation. Lenz in turn sent YouTube a counter-notification, claiming fair use and requesting that the video be reposted. Six weeks later, YouTube reposted the video. In July 2007, Lenz sued Universal for misrepresentation under the DMCA, and sought a declaration from the court that her use of the copyrighted song was non-infringing.

In September 2007, Prince stated in the media that he intended to "reclaim his art on the internet" and to challenge Lenz's suit. In October 2007, Universal released a statement that Prince and Universal intended to remove all user-generated content involving Prince and his music from the Internet, as a matter of principle.

== District court ruling ==
The dispute was first heard at the District Court for the Northern District of California in 2010. Based on Prince's and Universal's statements, Lenz argued that Universal was issuing takedown notices in bad faith, as they vowed to remove all Prince-related content on sight rather than consider whether each posting truly violated copyright. Lenz claimed that her video was non-infringing fair use because it used a minor portion of Prince's song in the background of a video that was intended to highlight her son. Universal claimed that this argument would subject the fair use analysis to subjective interpretations.

The district court held that copyright owners must consider fair use before issuing DMCA takedown notices. Thus, the district court denied Universal's motion to dismiss Lenz's claim. The district court believed that Universal's concerns over the burden of considering fair use were overstated, as mere good faith consideration of fair use, not necessarily an in-depth investigation, is a sufficient defense against misrepresentation.

However, the court also denied Lenz's claim of misrepresentation, because even though Universal should have considered good faith before accusing her of copyright infringement, the company did not have to argue that it had not exercised bad faith under the DMCA. Furthermore, Lenz had not suffered any significant damages from Universal's notice to YouTube to take down the video.

In a later proceeding, the district court ruled against both parties in their motions for summary judgment against each other, creating a stalemate. Both parties appealed, with Lenz continuing to claim that copyright holders should not abuse the takedown notice process, and Universal continuing its efforts to protect its copyrights for Prince's music against unauthorized duplication on the Internet.

== Circuit court ruling ==
Recording of oral arguments in the appeal to the Ninth Circuit

Both parties appealed to the Ninth Circuit Court of Appeals in 2015. On September 14, 2015, the circuit court affirmed the district court, holding that copyright holders have a "duty to consider—in good faith and prior to sending a takedown notification—whether allegedly infringing material constitutes fair use".

Importantly, the court viewed fair use not as a valid excuse for otherwise infringing conduct, but rather as consumer behavior that is not infringement in the first place. "Because 17 U.S.C. § 107 created a type of non-infringing use, fair use is 'authorized by the law' and a copyright holder must consider the existence of fair use before sending a takedown notification under § 512(c)."

While this ruling allowed Lenz's video to remain on the Internet with no further penalties or accusations of copyright infringement, Lenz appealed to the US Supreme Court with a request for further clarification on the takedown notice process under the DMCA. Lenz asked:

Whether the Ninth Circuit erred in concluding that the affirmation of good faith belief that a given use of material use is not authorized "by the copyright owner, its agent, or the law," required under Section 512(c) of the Digital Millennium Copyright Act ("DMCA"), may be purely subjective and, therefore, that an unreasonable belief—such as a belief formed without consideration of the statutory fair use factors—will not subject the sender of a takedown notice to liability under Section 512(f) of the DMCA?

The United States Supreme Court declined to grant certiorari in this case on June 19, 2017.

== Impact ==
Lenz v. Universal Music Corp. attracted a fair amount of media attention, as a dispute in which there was no clear winner, while a powerful entertainment company may have made absurd claims about the damage caused to its copyrights by a YouTube video in which only a short segment of its song was heard in poor audio quality. Despite the media attention toward the ruling, several legal scholars noted that the ultimate decision did little to clarify how much of a copyrighted work can be copied under fair use for Internet content that causes little financial or reputational harm. Others noted that the DMCA process allowing a copyright holder to request the removal of items from Internet platforms, and the reply process for the creators of allegedly infringing content, both remained unclear after the ruling.
