= Moberg =

Moberg may refer to:

- 7360 Moberg, asteroid
- Moberg (surname)
- The Brothers Moberg

== See also ==
- Morris "Moe" Berg (1902–1972), American baseball player and spy
