= Moberg (surname) =

Moberg is a surname. Notable people with the surname include:

- Andrea Moberg (born 1994), Peruvian model, activist and beauty pageant titleholder
- Carina Moberg (1966–2012), Swedish politician
- Christina Moberg (born 1947), Swedish chemist
- David Moberg (journalist) (1943–2022), American journalist
- David O. Moberg (1922–2023), American scholar of religion
- Elsa Moberg (1889–2001), oldest Swede on record
- Emilie Moberg (born 1991), Norwegian racing cyclist
- Erik Moberg (born 1986), Swedish footballer
- Eva Moberg (orienteer) (born 1954), Swedish orienteering competitor
- Eva Moberg (writer) (1932–2011), Swedish feminist and writer
- Eva X Moberg (1962–1999), Swedish journalist
- Frank Moberg (1940–2025), Finnish-Swedish ice hockey executive
- Gunnie Moberg (1941–2007), Swedish photographer and writer
- Ida Moberg (1859–1947), Finnish musician
- James Moberg (born 1994), American soccer player
- Jörgen Moberg (born 1971), Swedish footballer
- Lars-Erik Moberg (born 1957), Swedish canoer
- Lennart Moberg (1918–1991), Swedish triple jumper
- Osvald Moberg (1888–1933), Swedish gymnast
- Peer Moberg (born 1971), Norwegian sailor
- Sebastian Moberg (born 1996), Finnish ice hockey defenceman
- Susanne Moberg (born 1986), Swedish footballer
- Tone Lise Moberg (born 1970), Norwegian singer and song teacher
- Vegard Leikvoll Moberg (born 1991), Norwegian footballer
- Vilhelm Moberg (1898–1973), Swedish author and historian
- Wilhelm Moberg (sailor) (1898–1977), Swedish Olympic sailor

== See also ==
- 7360 Moberg, minor planet
- The Brothers Moberg, Swedish musical instrument specialists
- Moberg v. 33T LLC, 2009 lawsuit
- Morberg, surname
