= Buenos Aires Convention =

1910 North American multi-lateral agreement regarding copyrights

Convention on Literary and Artistic Copyright
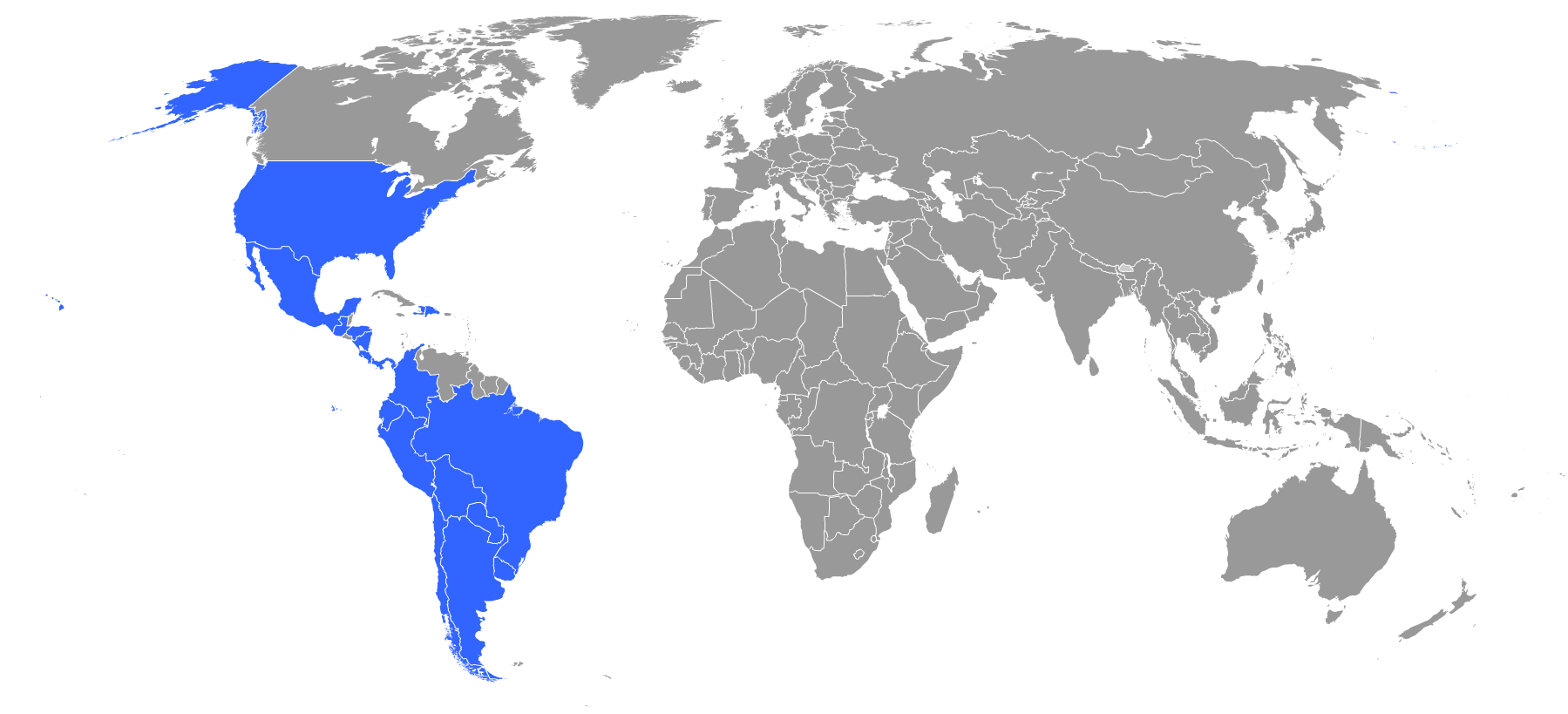
- Signatories to the Buenos Aires Convention
- Type: Multilateral
- Signed: 11 August 1910
- Location: Buenos Aires, Argentina
- Parties: 18
- Depositary: Ministry of Foreign Affairs of the Argentine Republic
- Languages: Spanish, English, Portuguese and French

Full text
- Buenos Aires Convention at Wikisource

The Buenos Aires Convention (Third Pan-American Convention) is an international copyright treaty signed in Buenos Aires, Argentina, on 11 August 1910, providing mutual recognition of copyrights where the work carries a notice containing a statement of reservation of rights (Art. 3). This was commonly done with the phrase "All rights reserved" (Spanish: Todos los derechos reservados; Portuguese: Todos os direitos reservados) next to the copyright notice. This implementation varied as US law only required the author and year of publishing. Copyright protection under the convention is granted for the shorter of the terms of the protecting country and the source country of the work ("rule of the shorter term", Arts. 6, 7). The rather vague nature of the requirement for a statement of reservation led to the development of longer and more legalistic wordings, which have persisted despite the developments in international copyright law.

The convention is specifically retained by the Universal Copyright Convention (UCC) of 6 September 1952 (Art. 18 Geneva Act), with the most recent formulation taking precedence in case of conflict. As the Buenos Aires Convention was not modified, the presence of a simple copyright notice was sufficient to ensure mutual recognition of copyright between countries which became parties to the UCC (which only Honduras never did). As of 23 August 2000, all parties to the Buenos Aires Convention are also parties to the Berne Convention for the Protection of Literary and Artistic Works, which provides for mutual recognition of copyright without any formalities (Art. 5.2 Berne).

The Buenos Aires Convention became a "special agreement" in the terms of Article 20 of the Berne Convention. It remains in force, notably for determining the source country of a work and hence the term of protection which is applicable in countries which apply the "rule of the shorter term": when a work is simultaneously published in a Convention State and a non-Convention State, the Convention State will be taken to be the source country regardless of the term of protection in the non-Convention State.

Country	Buenos Aires Convention	UCC	Berne
Argentina	19 April 1950	13 February 1958	10 June 1967
Bolivia	15 May 1914	22 March 1990	4 November 1993
Brazil	31 August 1915	13 January 1960	9 February 1922
Chile	14 June 1955	16 September 1955	5 June 1970
Colombia	23 December 1936	18 June 1976	7 March 1988
Costa Rica	30 November 1916	16 September 1955	10 June 1978
Dominican Republic	31 October 1912	8 May 1983	24 December 1997
Ecuador	27 April 1914	5 June 1957	9 October 1991
Guatemala	28 March 1913	28 October 1964	11 January 1997
Haiti	27 November 1919	16 September 1955	11 January 1996
Honduras	27 April 1914	—	25 January 1990
Mexico	24 April 1964	12 May 1957	11 June 1967
Nicaragua	15 December 1913	16 August 1961	23 August 2000
Panama	25 November 1913	17 October 1962	8 June 1996
Paraguay	20 September 1917	11 March 1962	2 January 1992
Peru	30 April 1920	16 October 1963	20 August 1988
United States	1 August 1911	16 September 1955	1 March 1989
Uruguay	11 May 1919	12 April 1993	10 July 1967

Sources: U.S. Copyright Office, UNESCO, WIPO
