= NLM Technical Bulletin =

U.S. Government newsletter

- Language: English

Publication details
- Former name: Library Network/MEDLARS Technical Bulletin
- History: 1969–present
- Publisher: United States National Library of Medicine (United States)
- Frequency: Bimonthly
- Open access: Yes

Standard abbreviations
- ISO 4: NLM Tech. Bull.

Indexing
- ISSN: 0146-3055 (print); 2161-2986 (web)
- LCCN: 00237050
- OCLC no.: 39104696
- OCLC no.: 03261123

Links
- Journal homepage

The National Library of Medicine Technical Bulletin is a public domain information newsletter of the Office of Engagement and Training, United States National Library of Medicine (NLM). The newsletter contains current news and information for NLM products and services, listings for NLM events, and update notes for NLM offerings, including PubMed, MEDLINE, and MeSH.

== Format ==
The bulletin is not peer reviewed.

It was published on a monthly schedule until 1990, after which point it was switched to bimonthly. It was a paper periodical until the January–February 1998 issue, which was published online, along with all further issues.

== History ==
The newsletter's first issue appeared in 1969 as the MEDLARS/Network Technical Bulletin; it was changed after six issues to Library Network/MEDLARS Technical Bulletin. In 1977, the current NLM Technical Bulletin was formed from the merger of the Library Network/MEDLARS Technical Bulletin and the TOXLINE Technical Bulletin; and the new bulletin continued with the issue numbers of the Library Network/MEDLARS Technical Bulletin.

=== Website ===
After the 1998 transition to an online-only publication, printable versions of each issue were offered on the website. Since 2018, a printable version has not been offered for new issues.
