= Copyright law of Bolivia =

The basic law on copyright in Bolivia is Law No.1322 of April 13, 1992 on Copyright. Related and subsequent amending legislation are listed at the relevant WIPO page. Bolivia has signed the Berne Convention.
