= Conflict of interest =

Situation when a party is involved in multiple interests

A conflict of interest (COI) is a situation in which a person or organization is involved in multiple interests, financial or otherwise, and serving one interest could involve working against another. Typically, this relates to situations in which the personal interest of an individual or organization might adversely affect a duty owed to make decisions for the benefit of a third party.

An "interest" is a commitment, obligation, duty or goal associated with a specific social role or practice. By definition, a "conflict of interest" occurs if, within a particular decision-making context, an individual is subject to two coexisting interests that are in direct conflict with each other ("competing interests"). This is important because under these circumstances, the decision-making process can be disrupted or compromised, affecting the integrity or reliability of the outcomes.

Typically, a conflict of interest arises when an individual occupies two social roles simultaneously, generating opposing benefits or loyalties. The interests involved can be pecuniary or non-pecuniary. The existence of such conflicts is an objective fact, not a state of mind, and does not in itself indicate any lapse or moral error. However, especially where a decision is being taken in a fiduciary context, it is important that the contending interests are clearly identified and the process for separating them is rigorously established. Typically, this will involve the conflicted individual either giving up one of the conflicting roles or recusing themselves from the particular decision-making process.

The presence of a conflict of interest is independent of the occurrence of inappropriateness. Therefore, a conflict of interest can be discovered and voluntarily defused before any corruption occurs. A conflict of interest exists if the circumstances are reasonably believed (based on past experience and objective evidence) to create a risk that a decision may be unduly influenced by other, secondary interests, and not on whether a particular individual is actually influenced by a secondary interest.

A widely used definition is: "A conflict of interest is a set of circumstances that creates a risk that professional judgment or actions regarding a primary interest will be unduly influenced by a secondary interest." Primary interest refers to the principal goals of the profession or activity, such as the protection of clients, the health of patients, the integrity of research, and the duties of public officers. Secondary interest includes personal benefit and is not limited to only financial gain but also such motives as the desire for professional advancement, or the wish to do favors for family and friends. These secondary interests are not treated as wrong in and of themselves, but become objectionable when they are believed to have greater weight than the primary interests. Conflict of interest rules in the public sphere mainly focus on financial relationships because they are relatively objective, fungible, and quantifiable, and they usually involve the political, legal, and medical fields.

A conflict of interest is a set of conditions in which professional judgment concerning a primary interest (such as a patient's welfare or the validity of research) tends to be unduly influenced by a secondary interest (such as financial gain). Conflict-of-interest rules [...] regulate the disclosure and avoidance of these conditions.

— Dennis F. Thompson, The New England Journal of Medicine, 1993

== In the practice of law ==
Conflicts of interest have been described as the most pervasive issue facing modern lawyers. Legal conflicts rules are at their core corollaries to a lawyer's two basic fiduciary duties: (1) the duty of loyalty and (2) the duty to preserve client confidences. The lawyer's duty of loyalty is fundamental to the attorney-client relationship and has developed from the biblical maxim that no person can serve more than one master. Just as fundamental is the lawyer's duty to maintain client confidences, which protects clients' legitimate expectations that they can make full disclosure of all facts to their attorneys without fear of exposure.

The basic formulation of the conflicts of interest rule is that a conflict exists "if there is a substantial risk that the lawyer's representation of the client would be materially and adversely affected by the lawyer's own interests or by the lawyer's duties to another current client, a former client, or a third person." The duty of loyalty requires an attorney not to act directly adverse to an existing client, even on an unrelated matter where the lawyer has no client confidences. Such a loyalty conflict has been labeled a concurrent conflict of interest. The duty of confidentiality is protected in rules prohibiting so-called successive conflicts of interest when a lawyer proposes to act adversely to the interests of a former client. A lawyer who has formerly represented a client in a matter is precluded from representing another person in the same or a substantially related matter that is materially adverse to the former client. These two basic formulations – that a lawyer may not act directly adverse to a current client or adverse to a former client on a substantially related matter – form the cornerstone of modern legal conflicts of interest rules.

=== Concurrent conflicts of interest ===
==== Direct adversity to current client ====
An attorney owes the client undivided loyalty. The courts have described this principle as "integral to the nature of an attorney's duty". Without undivided loyalty, irreparable damage may be done "to the existing client's sense of trust and security – features essential to the effective functioning of the fiduciary relationship..." A key feature of the duty of loyalty is that an attorney may not act directly adverse to a current client or represent a litigation adversary of the client in an unrelated matter. The damage done is to the client's confidence that the lawyer is serving their interests faithfully. An example of a lawyer acting directly adverse to a client is when the lawyer sues the client. At the other end of the spectrum is when a lawyer represents business competitors of the client who are not averse to it in a lawsuit or negotiation. Representing a client's business competitors in unrelated matters does not constitute direct adversity nor give rise to a loyalty conflict. As one state bar ethics committee has noted:

An attorney's representation of one client will often have indirect effects on other existing clients. For example, simultaneously representing business competitors in unrelated matters may indirectly impair each competitor's interests. It will be rare indeed for an attorney's representation of a client not to have numerous indirect adverse effects on others. Obtaining a benefit for a client will often mean disadvantaging another person or entity, and indirect consequences may follow to all who may be dependents or owners of the attorney's opponents. The attorney's duty of loyalty, however, extends only to adverse consequences on existing clients which are 'direct.'...Of the numerous and varied consequences which a representation of one client may have on other clients, well-established legal authority interpreting the duty of loyalty limits the scope of ethical inquiry to whether the other affected clients are parties to the case or transaction in which the attorney is acting. --California State Bar Ethics Opinion 1989-113.

Direct adversity may arise in litigation when an attorney sues a client or defends an adversary in an action their client has brought. It may also arise in business negotiations, when a lawyer negotiates on behalf of an adversary against a current client, even if the matter is unrelated to any matter the lawyer is handling for the client. However, merely advocating opposite sides of the same legal issue does not give rise to direct adversity. Even if a lawyer's advocacy in an unrelated matter may make unfavorable law for another client, such effects are only indirect and not subject to the conflicts rules. There is no conflict in advocating positions that may be unfavorable to another client so long as the lawyer is not directly litigating or negotiating against that client.

===== Identity of the client – corporations =====
One of the most frequently arising questions in corporate practice is whether parent corporations and their subsidiaries should be treated as the same or different entities for conflicts purposes. The first authority to rule on this question was the California State Bar Ethics Committee, which issued a formal opinion ruling that parent corporations and their subsidiaries are to be considered distinct entities for conflicts purposes. The California committee considered a situation where an attorney undertook a representation directly adverse to the wholly owned subsidiary of a client, when the lawyer did not represent the subsidiary. Relying on the entity as client framework in Model Rule 1.13, the California committee opined that there was no conflict as long as the parent and subsidiary did not have a "sufficient unity of interests." The committee announced the following standard for evaluating the separateness of parent and subsidiary:

In determining whether there is a sufficient unity of interests to require an attorney to disregard separate corporate entities for conflict purposes, the attorney should evaluate the separateness of the entities involved, whether corporate formalities are observed, the extent to which each entity has distinct and independent managements and board of directors, and whether, for legal purposes, one entity could be considered the alter ego of the other. -California State Bar Ethics Opinion 1989-113.

As one commentator has noted, "For a state ethics opinion, California Opinion 1989-113 has been unusually influential, both with courts there, with ethics committees elsewhere, and through the latter set of ethics committee opinions, with... recent decisions in other jurisdictions." The California opinion has been followed by ethics committees in such jurisdictions as New York, Illinois and the District of Columbia and served as the basis of ABA Formal Ethics Opinion 95-390. The law in most jurisdictions is that parent corporations and their subsidiaries are treated as distinct entities, except in limited circumstances noted by the California ethics committee where they have a unity of interests.

The Second Circuit has adopted a variation of the California standard. In GSI Commerce Solutions, Inc. v. BabyCenter LLC, the court ruled that parent corporations and their subsidiaries should be treated as the same entity for conflicts purposes when both companies rely "on the same in-house legal department to handle their legal affairs." However, the court ruled that the lawyer and client can contract around this default standard. The court quoted with approval the opinion of the City of New York Committee on Professional and Judicial Ethics, which stated, "corporate family conflicts may be averted by ... an engagement letter ... that delineates which affiliates, if any, of a corporate client the law firm represents..."

===== Material limitation conflicts =====
A concurrent conflict will also exist when "there is a significant risk that the representation of one or more clients will be materially limited by the lawyer's responsibilities to another client, a former client or a third person or by a personal interest of the lawyer." Comment 8 to Model Rule 1.7 states, by way of example, that an attorney representing multiple persons forming a joint venture may be materially limited in recommending the courses of action that any jointly represented client may take because of the lawyer's duty to the other participants in the joint venture.

The Supreme Court of Minnesota found a material limitation conflict in In re Petition for Disciplinary Action Against Christopher Thomas Kalla. In Kalla, an attorney was disciplined for representing a borrower bringing suit against her lender for charging a usurious interest rate while simultaneously representing the mortgage broker who arranged the loan as a third-party defendant in the same lawsuit. Although neither client had brought an action against the other, the court found a material limitation conflict: "Advocating for Client A would potentially harm Client B, who was potentially liable for contribution. Kalla's ability to fully advocate for both was materially limited by Kalla's dual representation."

=== Consent to concurrent conflicts of interest ===
==== Consent to current conflicts ====
A concurrent conflict of interest may be resolved if four conditions are met. They are:

1. the lawyer reasonably believes that the lawyer will be able to provide competent and diligent representation to each affected client;
2. the representation is not prohibited by law;
3. the representation does not involve the assertion of a claim by one client against another client represented by the lawyer in the same litigation or other proceeding before a tribunal; and
4. each affected client gives informed consent, confirmed in writing.

Informed consent requires that each affected client be fully advised about the material ways that the representation could adversely affect that client. In joint representations, the information provided should include the interests of the lawyer and other affected clients, the courses of action that could be foreclosed due to the joint representation, the potential danger that the client's confidential information might be disclosed, and the potential consequences if the lawyer had to withdraw at a later stage in the proceedings. Merely telling the client that there are conflicts, without further explanation, is not adequate disclosure. The lawyer must fully disclose the potential impairment to the lawyer's loyalty and explain how another unconflicted attorney might better serve the client's interests.

==== Prospective consent to future conflicts ====
It is not unusual in the current legal environment of large multinational and global law firms to seek advance or prospective waivers of future conflicts from their clients. A law firm is particularly likely to seek a prospective waiver when a large corporation seeks the firm's specialized knowledge in a small matter, without a high likelihood of repeat business. As the ABA stated in its Ethics Opinion 93-372:

when corporate clients with multiple operating divisions hire tens if not hundreds of law firms, the idea that, for example, a corporation in Miami retaining the Florida office of a national law firm to negotiate a lease should preclude that firm's New York office from taking an adverse position in a totally unrelated commercial dispute against another division of the same corporation strikes some as placing unreasonable limitations on the opportunities of both clients and lawyers. -ABA Formal Opinion 93-372 (1993).

Prospective waivers are most likely to be upheld by the courts when they are given by sophisticated corporate clients represented by independent counsel in the negotiation of the waiver. However, in Sheppard, Mullin, Richter & Hampton, LLP v. J-M Manufacturing Co., the California Supreme Court held that a prospective waiver that did not make specific disclosure of an actual current conflict was not effective to waive that conflict. As the court said,

By asking J-M to waive current conflicts as well as future ones, Sheppard Mullin did put J-M on notice that a current conflict might exist. But by failing to disclose to J-M the fact that a current conflict actually existed, the law firm failed to disclose to its client all the 'relevant circumstances' within its knowledge relating to its representation of J-M. 6 Cal. 5th 59 (2018) at p. 84.

The Sheppard Mullin case does not invalidate prospective waivers in California. It only holds that waivers of current and actual conflicts must specifically disclose those conflicts, an unremarkable conclusion.

==== The hot potato doctrine ====
If a client will not consent to a conflict and allow a lawyer to take on another representation, the lawyer cannot then withdraw from the existing representation, thus turning the existing client into a former client and ending the duty of loyalty. As the courts have stated, the lawyer cannot "drop a client like a hot potato" to cure a conflict. This label has stuck, and the doctrine is now aptly called the "hot potato" doctrine. However, as one commentator has pointed out, the reasoning underlying this line of cases has been sparse, and few courts have attempted to justify this result through an analysis of the ethics rules. The unstated rationale behind the Hot Potato doctrine is that a withdrawal attempted without good cause under Model Rule 1.16(b) is an ineffective withdrawal, which does not successfully terminate the existing attorney-client relationship. When viewed in this light, a withdrawal accomplished with good cause should be an effective withdrawal that does permit a lawyer to take on a representation that would otherwise be conflicting, as long as there is no substantial relationship with the prior matter. The standard used to assess conflicts involving such former clients will be discussed in the next section.

==== Successive conflicts of interest ====
===== The substantial relationship test =====
Conflicts of interest rules involving former clients are primarily designed to enforce the attorney's duty to preserve a client's confidential information. Model Rule 1.9(a) sets forth this doctrine in a rule that has come to be known as the substantial relationship test. The rule states:

A lawyer who has formerly represented a client in a matter shall not thereafter represent another person in the same or a substantially related matter in which that person's interests are materially adverse to the interests of the former client unless the former client gives informed consent, confirmed in writing. -MODEL RULES OF PROF'L CONDUCT r. 1.9(a).

Without the substantial relationship test, a client attempting to prove that its former lawyer possesses its confidential information might have to disclose publicly the very confidential information it is trying to protect. The substantial relationship test was designed to protect against such disclosures. Under this test, the attorney's possession of the former client's confidential information is presumed if "confidential information material to the current dispute would normally have been imparted to the attorney by virtue of the nature of the former representation." The substantial relationship test reconstructs whether confidential information was likely to be imparted by the former client to the lawyer by analyzing "the similarities between the two factual situations, the legal questions posed, and the nature and extent of the attorney's involvement with the cases."

===== Imputation of conflicts =====
The conflicts of an individual lawyer are imputed to all attorneys who "are associated with that lawyer in rendering legal services to others through a law partnership, professional corporation, sole proprietorship, or similar association". This imputation of conflicts can lead to difficulties when attorneys from one law firm leave and join another firm. The issue then arises whether the conflicts of the itinerant lawyer's former firm are imputed to their new firm.

In Kirk v. First American Title Co., the court ruled that an itinerant lawyer's conflicts are not imputed to their new law firm if that firm timely sets up an effective ethics screen preventing the lawyers from imparting any confidential information to the lawyers in the new firm. An effective ethics screen rebuts the presumption that the itinerant lawyers shared confidential information with the lawyers in the new firm. The components of an effective ethics screen, as described by the court in Kirk, are:

1. physical, geographic, and departmental separation of attorneys;
2. prohibitions against and sanctions for discussing confidential matters;
3. established rules and procedures preventing access to confidential information and files;
4. procedures preventing a disqualified attorney from sharing in the profits from the representation;
5. continuing education in professional responsibility.

Judicial disqualification, also referred to as recusal, refers to the act of abstaining from participation in an official action such as a court case/legal proceeding due to a conflict of interest of the presiding court official or administrative officer. Applicable statutes or canons of ethics may provide standards for recusal in a given proceeding or matter. Providing that the judge or presiding officer must be free from disabling conflicts of interest makes the fairness of the proceedings less likely to be questioned.

In the practice of law, the duty of loyalty owed to a client prohibits an attorney (or a law firm) from representing any other party with interests adverse to those of a current client. The few exceptions to this rule require informed written consent from all affected clients, i.e., an "ethical wall". In some circumstances, a client can never waive a conflict of interest. In perhaps the most common example encountered by the general public, the same firm should not represent both parties in a divorce or child custody matter. Found conflict can lead to denial or disgorgement of legal fees, or in some cases (such as the failure to make mandatory disclosure), criminal proceedings. In 1998, a Milbank, Tweed, Hadley & McCloy partner was found guilty of failing to disclose a conflict of interest, disbarred, and sentenced to 15 months of imprisonment. In the United States, a law firm usually cannot represent a client if the client's interests conflict with those of another client, even if separate lawyers within the firm represent the two clients, unless (in some jurisdictions) the lawyer is segregated from the rest of the firm for the duration of the conflict. Law firms often employ software with their case management and accounting systems to meet their duties, monitor their exposure to conflicts of interest, and assist in obtaining waivers.

== Outside of the practice of law ==
More generally, conflicts of interest can be defined as any situation in which an individual or corporation (either private or governmental) is in a position to exploit a professional or official capacity in some way for their personal or corporate benefit.

Depending upon the law or rules related to a particular organization, the existence of a conflict of interest may not, in and of itself, be evidence of wrongdoing. In fact, for many professionals, it is virtually impossible to avoid having conflicts of interest from time to time. A conflict of interest can, however, become a legal matter, for example, when an individual tries (and/or succeeds in) influencing the outcome of a decision for personal benefit. A director or executive of a corporation will be subject to legal liability if a conflict of interest breaches their duty of loyalty.

There is often confusion over these two situations. Someone accused of a conflict of interest may deny it exists because they did not act improperly. A conflict of interest can exist even if no improper acts result from it. (One way to understand this is to use the term "conflict of roles". A person with two roles—an individual who owns stock and is also a government official, for example—may experience situations where those two roles conflict. The conflict can be mitigated—see below—but it still exists. In and of itself, having two roles is not illegal, but the differing roles will certainly incentivize improper acts in some circumstances.)

As an example, in the sphere of business and control, according to the Institute of Internal Auditors:

conflict of interest is a situation in which an internal auditor, who is in a position of trust, has a competing professional or personal interest. Such competing interests can make it difficult to fulfil their duties impartially. A conflict of interest exists even if no unethical or improper act results. A conflict of interest can create an appearance of impropriety that can undermine confidence in the internal auditor, the internal audit activity, and the profession. A conflict of interest could impair an individual's ability to perform their duties and responsibilities objectively.

A few examples of conflict of interest are:

- When a member of the commissioners of a state highway commission owns a piece of property, the state will have to condemn it. The conflict of interest comes in because the commission will want to acquire the property at the lowest possible price (subject to it being at least fair market value) while, as the property owner, they will want the highest possible price they can get.
- When an officer or director of a corporation owns a patent or copyright that either was developed before they were involved with the corporation (which means it cannot be subject to a contractual right of assignment or work for hire) or that it was developed for a type of product not related to the scope of their employment. Authors or inventors will want a large license fee or royalty, while as an officer of the corporation, they are expected to offer as little as possible.
- A judge deciding a bench trial or an arbitrator in binding arbitration must not decide a case where a relative, acquaintance, or business partner is a party. Because they may give overly favorable terms to that party, or where they might impose excessively harsh terms (such as a judge having their estranged child, parent, or ex-spouse as a criminal defendant being sentenced before them).

== Organizational ==
An organizational conflict of interest (OCI) may exist in the same way as described above, for instance where a corporation provides two types of service to the government and these services conflict (e.g.: manufacturing parts and then participating in a selection committee comparing parts manufacturers). Corporations may develop simple or complex systems to mitigate the risk or perceived risk of a conflict of interest. These risks can be evaluated by a government agency (for example, in a U.S. Government RFP) to determine whether the risks create a substantial advantage to the organization in question over its competition, or will decrease the overall competitiveness of the bidding process.

== Types ==
The following are the most common forms of conflicts of interests:

- Self-dealing, in which an official who controls an organization causes it to enter into a transaction with the official, or with another organization that benefits the official only. The official is on both sides of the "deal."
- Outside employment, in which the interests of one job conflict with another.
- Nepotism, in which a spouse, child, or other close relative is employed (or applies for employment) by an individual, or where goods or services are purchased from a relative or from a firm controlled by a relative. To avoid nepotism in hiring, many employment applications ask if the applicant is related to a current employee of the company. This allows recusal if the employed relative has a role in the hiring process. If this is the case, the relative could then be recused from any hiring decisions.
- Gifts from friends who also do business with the person receiving the gifts or from individuals or corporations who do business with the organization in which the gift recipient is employed. Such gifts may include non-tangible things of value such as transportation and lodging.
- Pump and dump, in which a stockbroker who owns a security artificially inflates the price by "upgrading" it or spreading rumors, sells the security and adds a short position, then "downgrades" the security or spreads negative rumors to push the price down.

Other improper acts that are sometimes classified as conflicts of interest may have a better classification. For example, accepting bribes can be classified as corruption, the use of government or corporate property or assets for personal use is fraud, and unauthorized distribution of confidential information is a security breach. For these improper acts, there is no inherent conflict.

COI is sometimes termed competition of interest rather than "conflict", emphasizing a connotation of the natural competition between valid interests—rather than the classical definition of conflict, which would include by definition including a victim and unfair aggression. Nevertheless, this denotation of conflict of interest is not generally seen.

== Examples ==
=== Academic and professional standards ===
Many professions are governed by standards of impartiality, including law, public administration, social work, and academia. Obligations of academic disclosure of may be covered in style guides addressing professional ethics.

=== Charity trustees ===
Trustees are required to identify and manage any conflicts of interest which might impact on their decision-making. In England and Wales, the Charity Commission notes that trustees must avoid allowing conflicts of interest to influence their decisions or even to "seem to" influence them.

=== Consulting firms ===
When working for governments, consulting firms face potential conflicts of interest. We can identify four of them: personal connections and interests, working with conflicting clients and assignments, providing for-profit advice, and using personal connections within government to influence decisions.

=== Environmental hazards and human health ===
Nena Baker summarized 176 studies of the potential impact of Bisphenol A on human health as follows:

Funding	Harm	No Harm
Industry	0	13 (100%)
Independent (e.g., government)	152 (86%)	11 (14%)

Lawrence Lessig noted that this does not mean that the funding source influenced the results. However, it does raise questions about the validity of the industry-funded studies specifically, because the researchers conducting those studies have a conflict of interest; they are subject at minimum to a natural human inclination to please the people who paid for their work. Lessig provided a similar summary of 326 studies of the potential harm from cell phone usage with results that were similar but not as stark.

=== Finance industry and economists ===
Economists (unlike other professions such as sociologists) do not formally subscribe to a professional ethical code. Close to 300 economists have signed a letter urging the American Economic Association (the discipline's foremost professional body), to adopt such a code. The signatories include George Akerlof, a Nobel laureate, and Christina Romer, who headed Barack Obama's Council of Economic Advisers.

This call for a code of ethics was supported by the public attention the documentary Inside Job (winner of an Academy Award) drew to the consulting relationships of several influential economists. This documentary focused on conflicts that may arise when economists publish results or provide public recommendations on topics that affect industries or companies with which they have financial links. Critics of the profession argue, for example, that it is no coincidence that financial economists, many of whom were engaged as consultants by Wall Street firms, were opposed to regulating the financial sector.

In response to criticism that the profession not only failed to predict the 2008 financial crisis but may actually have helped create it, the American Economic Association has adopted new rules in 2012: economists will have to disclose financial ties and other potential conflicts of interest in papers published in academic journals. Backers argue such disclosures will help restore faith in the profession by increasing transparency which will help in assessing economists' advice.

Economist Joseph Stiglitz argued that the Great Recession was partly created because, "Bankers acted greedily because they had incentives and opportunities to do so". They did this by making consumer financial products, like retail banking services and home mortgages, complex to enable charging higher fees. While more informed consumers may have been able to find better options than the major bank's primary offerings, many did not, which may have contributed to the financial industry's increased profits.

Stiglitz has faced criticism over a conflict of interest and violating Columbia University's transparency policies by not disclosing his status as a paid consultant to the Argentinian government, while writing articles defending Argentina's planned default on over $1 billion in bond debt during the 1998–2002 Argentine great depression. He has also been criticized for failing to disclose his paid consultancy to the Greek government while downplaying the risk of Greece defaulting on its debt during the Greek government-debt crisis of 2009.

Some economists have argued that a major portion of this increase and a driving force behind the Great Recession was the influence of money in politics. Between 1998 and 2008, the finance industry contributed an estimated $1.7 billion to political campaigns and spent $3.4 billion on lobbying, totaling $5.1 billion. Some argue this financial influence created conflicts of interest for legislators and the U.S. President, who may have been disincentivized from enacting policies that would negatively impact the finance industry, rather than protecting the public.

=== Finance industry and elected officials ===
Conflicts of interest among elected officials are part of the story behind the increase in the percentage of U.S. corporate domestic profits captured by the finance industry (depicted in the accompanying figure).

Finance industry (banks, securities and insurance) profits as a percentage of U.S. domestic corporate profits. In 1932–1933, total U.S. domestic corporate profit was negative, but the financial sector made a profit (making its percentage negative and off the scale in this graph).

From 1934 to 1985, the finance industry's share of U.S. domestic corporate profit averaged 13.8%. This increased to 23.5% between 1986 and 1999, and further increased to 32.6% between 2000 and 2010. Part of this increase may be due to increased efficiency from banking consolidation and innovations in new financial products, which benefit consumers. However, if most consumers had refused to accept financial products they did not understand (e.g. negative amortization loans), the finance industry would not have been as profitable as it has been, and the Great Recession might have been avoided or postponed.

If the finance industry's increased profit share from 23.5% to 32.6% is only attributed to governmental actions (subject to conflicts of interest created by campaign contributions), this suggests that the finance industry realized $270 billion in profit. This figure implies a return of over $50 for every $1 spent on political campaigns and finance industry lobbying. On a per capita basis, this would amount to almost $1,000 per U.S. resident. Few other investments have yielded such a high return in such a short time.

=== Government officials ===
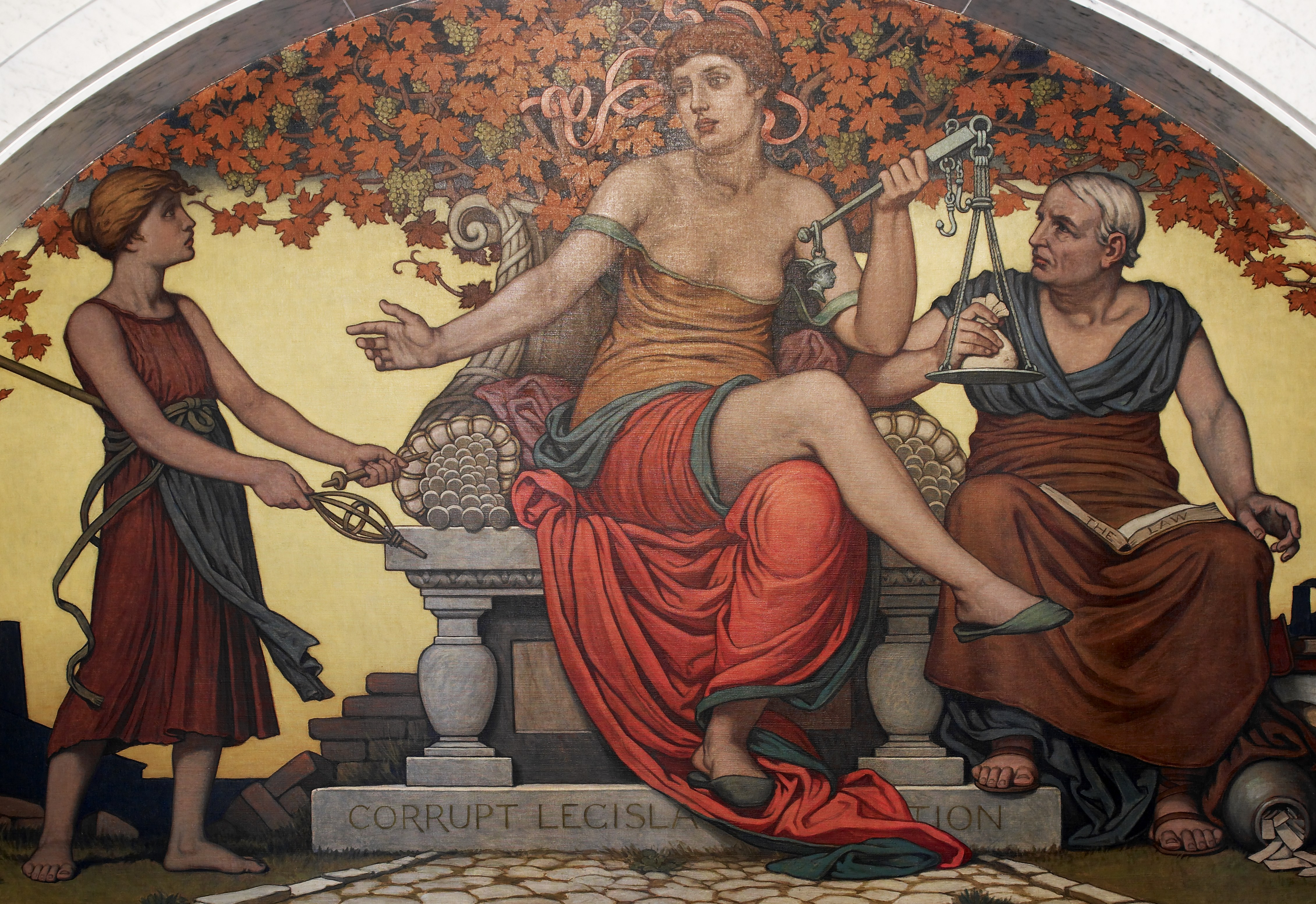
Conflict of interest in legislation; the interests of the poor and the interests of the rich. A personification of corrupt legislation weighs a bag of money and denies an appeal of poverty.

Regulating conflict of interest in government is an aim of political ethics. Public officials are expected to put service to the public and their constituents ahead of their personal interests. Conflict of interest rules are intended to prevent officials from making decisions in circumstances that could reasonably be perceived as violating this duty of office. Limiting conflicts is vital to the success of a democracy.

Rules in the executive branch tend to be stricter and easier to enforce than in the legislative branch. This is visible through one study that highlights how members of Congress with specific stock investments may vote on regulatory and interventionist legislation. Two problems make legislative ethics of conflicts difficult and distinctive.

First, as James Madison wrote, legislators should share a "communion of interests" with their constituents. Legislators cannot adequately represent their constituents' interests without also representing some of their own. As Senator Robert S. Kerr said, "I represent the farmers of Oklahoma, although I have large farm interests. I represent the oil business in Oklahoma...and I am in the oil business...They don't want to send a man here who has no community of interest with them, because he wouldn't be worth a nickel to them." The problem is distinguishing special interests from all constituents' general interests.

Second, the "political interests" of legislatures include campaign contributions, which they need to get elected and which are generally not illegal and not the same as a bribe. But under many circumstances, they can have the same effect. The problem is how to keep the secondary interest in raising campaign funds from overwhelming what should be their primary interest—fulfilling the duties of office.

Political campaign contributions dominate politics in the United States in many ways. Candidates are often not considered "credible" unless they have a campaign budget far beyond what could reasonably be raised by citizens of ordinary means. The impact of this money can be found in many places, most notably in studies of how campaign contributions affect legislative behavior. For example, sugar in the United States has been roughly double the international price for over half a century. In the 1980s, this added $3 billion to the annual budget of U.S. consumers, according to Stern, who provided the following summary of one part of how this happens:

Contributions from the sugar lobby, 1983–1986	Percent voting in 1985 against gradually reducing sugar subsidies
> $5,000	100%
$2,500–5,000	97%
$1,000–2,500	68%
$1–1,000	45%
$0	20%

This $3 billion translates into $41 per household per year. This is, in essence, a tax collected by a nongovernmental agency. It is a cost imposed on consumers by governmental decisions, but never considered in any standard tax collection data.

Stern notes that sugar interests contributed $2.6 million to political campaigns, representing well over a $1,000 return for each $1 contributed to political campaigns. This, however, does not include the cost of lobbying. Lessig cites six studies that consider the cost of lobbying with campaign contributions on various issues considered in Washington, D.C. These studies produced estimates of the anticipated return on each $1 invested in lobbying and political campaigns ranging from $6 to $220. Lessig notes that clients who pay tens of millions of dollars to lobbyists typically receive billions.

Lessig insists that this does not mean any legislator has sold their vote. One of the possible explanations Lessig gives for this phenomenon is that the money helped elect candidates who were more supportive of the issues pushed by the large amount of money spent on lobbying and political campaigns. He notes that if any money perverts democracy, it is the large contributions beyond the budgets of citizens of ordinary means; small contributions from common citizens have long been considered to support democracy.

When such large sums become virtually essential to a politician's future, it generates a substantive conflict of interest, contributing to a fairly well-documented distortion of the nation's priorities and policies. As Gilens and Page found in 2014, "When the preferences of economic elites and the stands of organized interest groups are controlled for, the preferences of the average American appear to have only a minuscule, near-zero, statistically non-significant impact upon public policy."

Beyond this, whether elected or not, governmental officials often leave public service to work for companies affected by legislation they helped enact or companies they used to regulate. This practice is called the "revolving door". Former legislators and regulators are accused of (a) using inside information for their new employers or (b) compromising laws and regulations in hopes of securing lucrative employment in the private sector. This possibility creates a conflict of interest for all public officials whose future may depend on the revolving door.

=== Healthcare ===
The influence of the pharmaceutical industry on medical research has been a major cause for concern. In 2009, a study found that "a significant number of academic institutions" do not have clear guidelines for relationships between Institutional Review Boards and industry. The medical-industrial complex describes the interaction between physicians' conflict of interest with for-profit healthcare, continuing medical education, and patients' ethical considerations.

In contrast to this viewpoint, an article and associated editorial in the New England Journal of Medicine in May 2015 emphasized the importance of pharmaceutical industry-physician interactions for the development of novel treatments, and argued that moral outrage over industry malfeasance had unjustifiably led many to overemphasize the problems created by financial conflicts of interest. The article noted that major healthcare organizations such as the National Center for Advancing Translational Sciences of the National Institutes of Health, the President's Council of Advisors on Science and Technology, the World Economic Forum, the Gates Foundation, the Wellcome Trust, and the Food and Drug Administration had encouraged greater interactions between physicians and industry to bring greater benefits to patients.

=== Insurance claims adjusters ===
Insurance companies retain claims adjusters to represent their interest in adjusting claims. It is in the best interest of the insurance companies that the very smallest settlement is reached with its claimants. Based on the adjuster's experience and knowledge of the insurance policy it is very easy for the adjuster to convince an unknowing claimant to settle for less than what they may otherwise be entitled which could be a larger settlement. There is always a very good chance for a conflict of interest existing when one adjuster tries to represent both sides of a financial transaction such as an insurance claim. This problem is exacerbated when the claimant is told or believes, the insurance company's claims adjuster is fair and impartial enough to satisfy both their and the insurance company's interests. These types of conflicts could easily be avoided by the use of a third-party platform, independent of the insurers, which is agreed to, and named in the policy.

=== News media ===
Commercial news media have a conflict of interest in discussing anything that may impact their ability to communicate with their audience. Most news outlets, when reporting a story that involves a parent company or a subsidiary, will explicitly report this fact as part of the story, to alert the audience that their reporting has the potential for bias due to the possible conflict of interest.

The business model of commercial media organizations (i.e., any that accept advertising) is selling behavior change in their audience to advertisers. However, few in their audience are aware of the conflict of interest between the profit motive and the altruistic desire to serve the public and "give the audience what it wants".

Many major advertisers test their ads in various ways to measure the return on investment in advertising. Advertising rates are set as a function of the size and spending habits of the viewing audience as measured by the Nielsen Ratings. Media action expressing this conflict of interest is illustrated in the reaction of Rupert Murdoch, Chairman of News Corporation (the owner of Fox Broadcasting, to changes in data collection methodology adopted by Nielsen in 2004 to measure viewing habits more accurately. The results corrected a previous overestimate of Fox's market share. Murdoch reacted by getting leading politicians to denounce the Nielsen Ratings as "racist". Susan Whiting, president and CEO of Nielsen Media Research, responded by quietly sharing Nielsen's data with her leading critics. The criticism disappeared, and Fox paid Nielsen's fees. Murdoch had a conflict of interest between the reality of his market and his finances.

Commercial media organizations can lose money if they provide content that offends their audience or advertisers. The substantial media consolidation that has occurred since the 1980s has reduced the alternatives available to the audience, thereby making it easier for the ever-larger companies in this increasingly oligopolistic industry to hide news and entertainment potentially offensive to advertisers without losing audience.

If the news media provide too much information on how Congress spends its time, a major advertiser could be offended and could reduce their advertising expenditures with the offending media company. This is one of the ways the market system has determined which companies won and which either went out of business or were purchased by others during this period of media consolidation. (Advertisers do not like to feed the mouth that bites them, and often do not. Similarly, commercial media organizations are not eager to bite the hand that feeds them.) Advertisers have been known to fund media organizations with editorial policies they find offensive if that media outlet provides access to a sufficiently attractive audience segment they cannot efficiently reach otherwise.

Election years are a major boon to commercial broadcasters because virtually all political advertising is purchased with minimal planning, therefore, paying the highest rates. The commercial media have a conflict of interest in anything that could make it easier for candidates to get elected with less money.

Accompanying this trend in media consolidation has been a substantial reduction in investigative journalism, reflecting this conflict of interest between the business objectives of the commercial media and the public's need to know what government is doing in their name. This change has been tied to substantial changes in law and culture in the United States. To cite only one example, researchers have tied this decline in investigative journalism to an increased coverage of the "police blotter". This has further been tied to the fact that the United States has the highest incarceration rate in the world.

Beyond this, virtually all commercial media companies own substantial copyrighted material. This gives them an inherent conflict of interest in any public policy issue affecting copyrights. McChesney noted that the commercial media have lobbied successfully for changes in copyright law that have led "to higher prices and a shrinking of the marketplace of ideas", increasing the power and profits of the large media corporations at public expense. One result of this is that "the people cease to have a means of clarifying social priorities and organizing social reform". A free market has a mechanism for controlling abuses of power by media corporations: If their censorship becomes too egregious, they lose audience, which in turn reduces their advertising rates. However, the effectiveness of this mechanism has been substantially reduced over the past quarter century by "the changes in the concentration and integration of the media." Would the Anti-Counterfeiting Trade Agreement have advanced to the point of generating substantial protests without the secrecy behind which that agreement was negotiated—and would the government attempts to sustain that secrecy have been as successful if the commercial media had not been a primary beneficiary and had not had a conflict of interest in suppressing discussion thereof?

=== Purchasing agents and sales personnel ===
A person working as the equipment purchaser for a company may earn a bonus proportionate to the amount the company is under budget at year-end. However, this becomes an incentive for the employee to purchase inexpensive, substandard equipment. Therefore, this is counter to the interests of those in the company who must actually use the equipment. W. Edwards Deming listed "purchasing on price alone" as number 4 of his famous 14 points, and he often said things to the effect that "He who purchases on price alone deserves to get rooked."

=== Real estate agents ===
Real estate brokers have an inherent conflict of interest with the sellers they represent, because the usual commission structures of brokers motivate them to sell quickly rather than to sell at a higher price. However, a broker representing a buyer has a distinct disincentive to negotiate a lower price on behalf of their client, because they will simultaneously be negotiating their own commission lower.

=== Self-regulation ===
Self-regulation of any group may also be a conflict of interest. If an entity, such as a corporation or government bureaucracy, is asked to eliminate unethical behavior within its own group, it may be in its interest in the short run to eliminate the appearance of unethical behavior, rather than the behavior itself, by keeping any ethical breaches hidden, instead of exposing and correcting them. An exception occurs when the ethical breach is already known by the public. In that case, it could be in the group's interest to end the ethical problem of which the public has knowledge, but keep the remaining breaches hidden.

=== Stockbrokers ===
A conflict of interest is a manifestation of moral hazard, particularly when a financial institution provides multiple services and the potentially competing interests of those services may lead to a concealment of information or dissemination of misleading information. A conflict of interest exists when a party to a transaction could potentially make a gain from taking actions that are detrimental to the other party in the transaction.

There are many types of conflicts of interest such as a pump and dump by stockbrokers. This is when a stockbroker who owns a security artificially inflates the price by upgrading it or spreading rumors, and then sells the security and adds short position. They will then downgrade the security or spread negative rumors to push the price back down. This is an example of stock fraud. It is a conflict of interest because the stockbrokers are concealing and manipulating information to make it misleading for the buyers. The broker may claim to have the "inside" information about impending news and will urge buyers to buy the stock quickly. Investors will buy the stock, which creates a high demand and raises the prices. This rise in prices can entice more people to believe the hype and then buy shares as well. The stockbrokers will then sell their shares and stop promoting, the price will drop, and other investors are left holding stock that is worth nothing compared to what they paid for it. In this way, brokers use their knowledge and position to gain personally at the expense of others.

The Enron scandal is a major example of pump and dump. Executives participated in an elaborate scheme, falsely reporting profits, thus inflating its stock prices, and covered up the real numbers with questionable accounting; 29 executives sold overvalued stock for more than a billion dollars before the company went bankrupt.

A financial institution with a conflict of interest may also be charged with market manipulation. Stockbrokers that act as market makers have a duty to establish bona fide. A conflict of interest serves against that regulation. Stockbrokers have to prove that their trading interests and transacting interests do not interfere with serving the interests of investors at brokerages.

== Mitigation ==
=== Removal ===
Sometimes, people who may be perceived to have a conflict of interest resign from a position or sell a shareholding in a venture, to eliminate the conflict of interest going forward. For example, Lord Evans of Weardale resigned as a non-executive director of the UK National Crime Agency after a tax-avoidance-related controversy about HSBC, where Lord Evans was also a non-executive director. This resignation was stated to have taken place in order to avoid the appearance of conflict of interest.

=== "Blind trust" ===
Blind trusts can perhaps mitigate conflicts of interest scenarios by giving an independent trustee control of a beneficiary's assets. The independent trustee must have the power to sell or transfer interests without knowledge of the beneficiary. Thus, the beneficiary becomes "blind" to the impact of official actions on private interests held in trust.

As an example, a politician who owns shares in a company that may be affected by government policy may put those shares in a blind trust with themselves or their family as the beneficiary. It is disputed whether this really removes the conflict of interest, however.

Blind trusts may in fact obscure conflicts of interest, and for this reason it is illegal to fund political parties in the UK via a blind trust if the identity of the real donor is concealed.

=== Disclosure ===
Commonly, politicians and high-ranking government officials are required to disclose financial information—assets such as stock, debts such as loans, and/or corporate positions held, typically annually. To protect privacy (to some extent), financial figures are often disclosed in ranges such as "$100,000 to $500,000" and "over $2,000,000". Certain professionals are required either by rules related to their professional organization, or by statute, to disclose any actual or potential conflicts of interest. In some instances, the failure to provide full disclosure is a crime.

However, there is limited evidence regarding the effect of conflict of interest disclosure despite its widespread acceptance. A 2012 study published in the Journal of the American Medical Association showed that routine disclosure of conflicts of interest by American medical school educators to pre-clinical medical students were associated with an increased desire among students for limitations in some industry relationships. However, there were no changes in the perceptions of students about the value of disclosure, the influence of industry relationships on educational content, or the instruction by faculty with relevant conflicts of interest.

One line of research suggests that disclosure can have "perverse effects" or, at least, is not the panacea regulators often take it to be.

=== Recusal ===
Those with a conflict of interest are expected to recuse themselves from (i.e., abstain from) decisions where such a conflict exists. The imperative for recusal varies depending upon the circumstance and profession, either as common sense ethics, codified ethics, or by statute. For example, if the governing board of a government agency is considering hiring a consulting firm for a task, and one firm under consideration has a close relative of a board member as a partner, then that board member should not vote on which firm is selected. In fact, to minimize any conflict, the board member should not participate in any way in the decision, including discussions.

Judges are supposed to recuse themselves from cases when personal conflicts of interest may arise. For example, if a judge has participated in a case previously in some other judicial role he/she is not allowed to try that case. Recusal is also expected when one of the lawyers in a case might be a close personal friend, or when the outcome of the case might directly affect the judge, such as whether a car maker is obliged to recall a model that a judge drives. This is required by law under Continental civil law systems and by the Rome Statute, organic law of the International Criminal Court.

== See also ==
- Conflict-of-interest editing on Wikipedia
- Conflicts of interest in academic publishing
- Corruption
- Duty to defend
- Ethics
- Friend of a friend
- Incentive
- Insider trading
- Jury nullification
- Moral hazard
- Perverse incentive
- Quid pro quo
- Remuneration
- Reservation of rights
- Revolving door (politics)
- Tragedy of the commons
- Vested interest (communication theory)
