= Copyright law of Venezuela =

The basic law on copyright in Venezuela is the Law on Copyright 1993 as supplemented by various other laws and conventions, specifically the Regulations under the Law on Copyright (approved by Decree No. 618 of April 11, 1995). Venezuela has signed the Berne Convention.
