= Copyright law of Honduras =

The main laws relating to copyright in Honduras are the:

- Copyright and Neighboring Rights Law (approved by Decree No. 4-99-E)
- Industrial Property Law (approved by Decree No. 12-99-E)

In addition to these, Honduras has enacted many other laws relating to copyright.

Honduras has signed the Berne Convention.
