= Public domain in the United States =

Copyright status of works* first published in the US
Year of the first publication**	Copyright status
Before 1931; During 1931–1963, without notice, or with notice but not renewed within 28 years of the first publication; During 1964–1977, without notice; From 1978 to March 1, 1989, without notice, and without registration within 5 years of the first publication	Work has entered US public domain
During 1931–1963, with notice, and renewal; During 1964–1977, with notice	Copyrighted for 95 years after the first publication
From 1978 to March 1, 1989, pre-1978 creation with notice, or without notice but registered within 5 years of the first publication; From March 2, 1989 to 2002, pre-1978 creation	If the author is known, copyrighted until the later of either 70 years p.m.a. or December 31, 2047; If author is unknown or corporate authorship, the earlier of 95 years after the first publication or 120 years after creation, but not before December 31, 2047
From 1978 to March 1, 1989, post-1977 creation with notice, or without notice but registered within 5 years of the first publication; From March 2, 1989 to 2002, post-1977 creation; Unpublished before 2003 (i.e. first published after 2002)	If author is known, copyrighted for 70 years p.m.a.; If author is unknown or corporate authorship, the earlier of 95 years after the first publication or 120 years after creation
*Excluding audio works; **Publication does not mean creation

Works are in the public domain if they are not covered by the intellectual property right known as copyright, or if the intellectual property rights to the works have expired. Works automatically enter the public domain when their copyright has expired. The United States Copyright Office is a federal agency tasked with maintaining copyright records.

All works (excepting sound recordings) first published or released in the United States before January 1, 1931, have lost their copyright protection 95 years later, effective January 1, 2026. In the same manner, works published in 1931 will enter the public domain as of January 1, 2027, and this cycle will repeat until works published in 2002 enter the public domain on January 1, 2098. Works of corporate authorship will continue to adhere to the 95-year term following the 2098 date. Under current copyright law, beginning in 2049, 1978 and beyond works by creators who died 70 years earlier will expire each year. For example, if a creator were to die in 2002, their works' copyright would last through the end of 2072 and enter the public domain on January 1, 2073.

Works that were published without a copyright notice before January 1, 1978 are also in the public domain, as are those published before March 1, 1989 if the copyright was not registered before or within five years of the date of publication and no effort was made to add a proper notice to subsequent copies. Works published before 1964 also entered the public domain if the copyright was not renewed 28 years later.

== History ==
This 2019 video from the United States Copyright Office explains the value of a public domain and why copyright matters. As a work of the US Government, this video itself is in the public domain.

In the United States, copyright at the federal level began when the Constitution, proposed in 1787, took effect on March 4, 1789. Prior to that, several states had enacted copyright laws, beginning with Connecticut in 1783. Creators of works created after the ratification of the Constitution could receive copyright, while works created before the Constitution took effect remain in the public domain with respect to federal copyright. The initial terms were set by the Copyright Act of 1790 with an initial term of fourteen years, and a one time renewal of fourteen years from the date of publication. In 1831, Congress extended the initial term to twenty-eight years, but left the fourteen year renewal in place.

At the start of the 20th century, Congress passed the Copyright Act of 1909 which extended the renewal period to a term of twenty-eight years for a total of fifty-six years. From 1962 through 1974, Congress passed interim extensions that ultimately extended the total term to seventy years, but only for works dating from September 10, 1906 to December 31, 1918.

In 1976, the system was overhauled with the Copyright Act of 1976, which revised the term to seventy-five years from publication for all works published prior to 1978, and dictated that copyrights expire at the end of the seventy-fifth year rather than from moment of publication. The 1976 Copyright Act also created new distinctions between works for hire/corporate authorship and individual authorship; with individual authorship receiving a term of life plus fifty years after the death of the last surviving author.

From January 1, 1982, to January 1, 1994, published works from 1906 to 1918 entered on a yearly basis following the end of their seventy-five year term. Published works from 1922 entered on January 1, 1998. Later in 1998, Congress passed the Copyright Term Extension Act which further revised the total terms to ninety-five years from publication for corporate authorship, and life plus seventy years for individual authorship. All other nuances of last surviving author remained.

Works began entering the public domain again starting on January 1, 2019 following no further copyright extensions. On January 1, 2022, all sound recordings published in 1922 and prior entered the public domain. As of January 1, 2026, all published works from 1930 and before and all published sound recordings from 1925 and before are in the public domain.

== Public domain works in the U.S. ==
A graph showing the expansion of U.S. copyright law over time (assuming works created 35 years before their authors' death)

=== Public-domain literature ===
Public-domain books within the United States include a number of popular titles, many of which are still commonly read and studied as part of the English-language literary canon. Examples include:

- Notes on the State of Virginia by Thomas Jefferson
- The Sketch Book of Geoffrey Crayon, Gent. by Washington Irving
- "The Murders in the Rue Morgue" by Edgar Allan Poe
- The Scarlet Letter by Nathaniel Hawthorne
- David Copperfield by Charles Dickens
- Moby-Dick by Herman Melville
- Uncle Tom's Cabin by Harriet Beecher Stowe
- The Adventures of Tom Sawyer by Mark Twain
- The Picture of Dorian Gray by Oscar Wilde
- The Invisible Man by H. G. Wells
- Ulysses by James Joyce
- The Great Gatsby by F. Scott Fitzgerald
- Mrs Dalloway by Virginia Woolf
- The Sun Also Rises by Ernest Hemingway
- The Sound and the Fury by William Faulkner

=== Public-domain images ===
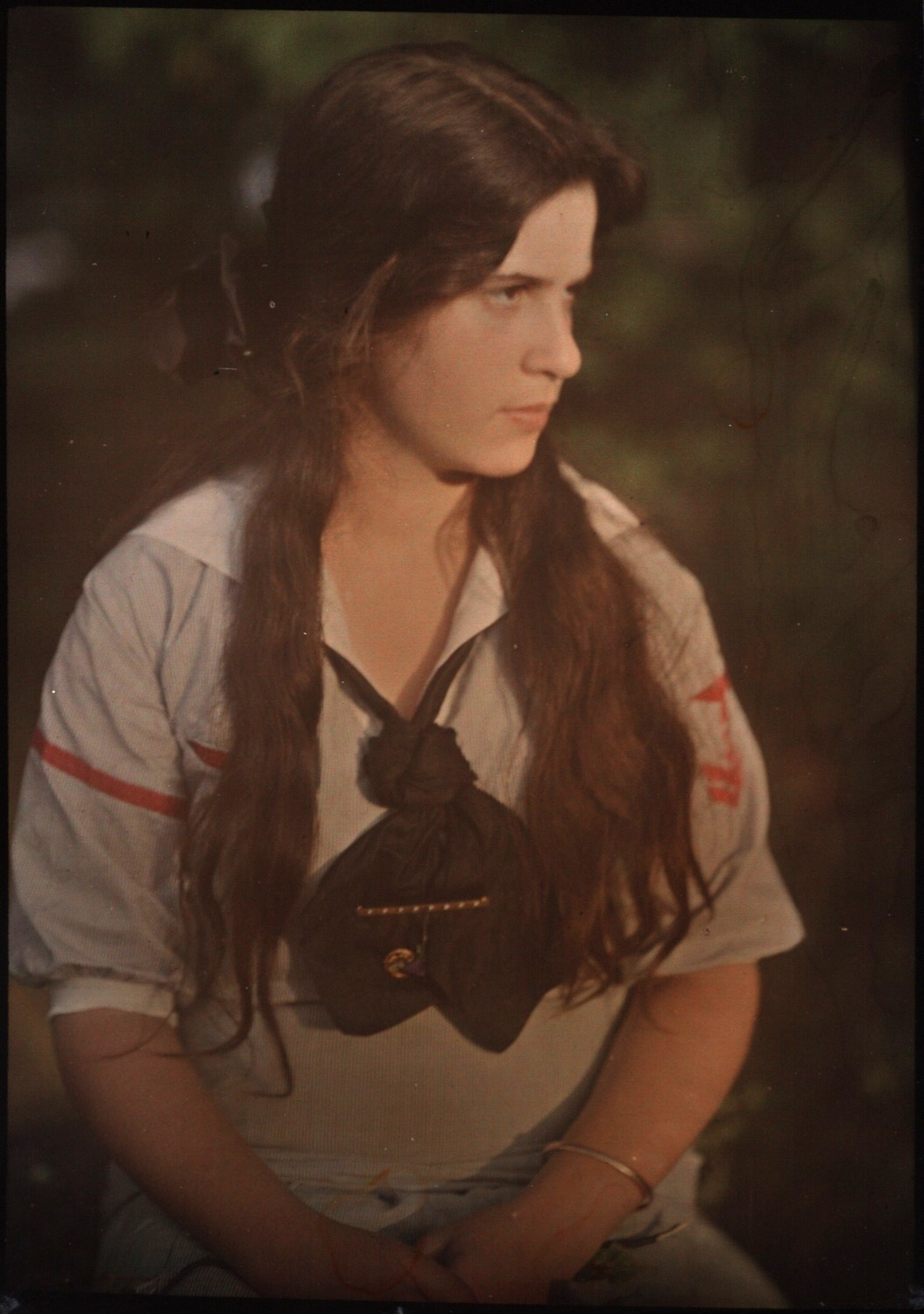
Katherine Stieglitz, autochrome, c. 1910

Thousands of paintings and photographs are in the public domain in the U.S., including photographs taken by Jacob Riis, Mathew Brady and Alfred Stieglitz.

=== Sound recordings under public domain ===
Sound recordings fixed in a tangible form before February 15, 1972, have generally been covered by common law, or in some cases by anti-piracy statutes enacted in certain states, not by federal copyright law, and the anti-piracy statutes typically have no duration limit. As such, virtually all sound recordings, regardless of age, are presumed to remain under copyright protection in the United States. The 1971 Sound Recordings Act, effective 1972, and the 1976 Copyright Act, effective 1978, provide federal copyright for unpublished and published sound recordings fixed on or after February 15, 1972. Recordings fixed before February 15, 1972, are still covered, to varying degrees, by common law or state statutes. Any rights or remedies under state law for sound recordings fixed before February 15, 1972, are not annulled or limited by the 1976 Copyright Act until February 15, 2067. On that date, all sound recordings fixed before February 15, 1972 will enter the public domain in the United States. The extent to which state statutes provide protection is inconsistent and unclear.

The Music Modernization Act was passed on October 11, 2018. The law mandates that recordings published before 1923 expired on January 1, 2022; recordings published between 1923 and 1946 will be protected for 100 years after release; recordings published between 1947 and 1956 will be protected for 110 years; and the protection for all recordings published after 1956 that were fixed prior to February 15, 1972, will terminate on February 15, 2067.

For sound recordings fixed on or after February 15, 1972, the earliest year that any will enter the public domain will be 2043, and not in any substantial number until 2048. Sound recordings fixed and published on or after February 15, 1972, and before 1978 that failed to carry a proper copyright notice on the recording medium or its cover entered the public domain on publication. From 1978 to March 1, 1989, the owners of the copyrights were permitted as long as five years to remedy their omission without losing the copyright. Since March 1, 1989, no copyright notice has been required.

Mamie Smith, Crazy Blues.
from Wikimedia Commons

Thomas Edison's voice.
from Wikimedia Commons

=== Public-domain videos ===
Since the invention of video capture and animation techniques, thousands of films or videos have entered the public domain. Some examples include:

==== Television series ====
A number of US television series have episodes in the public domain. Some were released before 1964 and without copyright renewal (such as nearly all of the extant DuMont Television Network archive); some were originally recorded before March 1, 1989 without a valid copyright notice; and some are works of the United States government.

Public-domain status of television episodes complicated by derivative-work considerations and disputes about what constitutes "publication" for legal purposes. For example, 16 episodes of The Andy Griffith Show are, because of expired copyright, in the public domain by themselves, but in 2007, CBS was able to claim an indirect copyright on the episodes by asserting that they were derivative works of earlier episodes still under copyright. The 1964 special Rudolph the Red-Nosed Reindeer was published with an invalid copyright notice but uses copious amounts of copyrighted music and is loosely based on an original story that is still under copyright.

==== Public-domain films ====
Night of the Living Dead (1968)

Hundreds of American live-action films are in the public domain because they were never copyrighted or because their copyrights have since expired. These films may be viewed online at websites such as the Internet Archive and can also be downloaded from various websites.

Notable examples of such public-domain films include:

- Charade (1963)
- Night of the Living Dead (1968)
- The Little Shop of Horrors (1960)
- Debbie Does Dallas (1978)

==== Public-domain animated films ====
Gulliver's Travels (1939)

Hundreds of American animated films are in the public domain, including:

- Steamboat Willie (1928, first appearance of Mickey Mouse)
- Aladdin and His Wonderful Lamp (featuring Popeye)
- Gulliver's Travels (1939 film)
- Popeye the Sailor Meets Sindbad the Sailor
- Popeye the Sailor Meets Ali Baba's Forty Thieves
- The Mummy Strikes (featuring Superman)
- Pantry Panic (featuring Woody Woodpecker)
- Sita Sings the Blues (2008 film)
- A Tale of Two Kitties (1942, first appearance of Tweety)
- Who's Who in the Zoo (1942, part of Looney Tunes series by Warner Bros.)

== Public domain in copyrighted works in the United States ==
Congress has restored expired copyrights several times: "After World War I and after World War II, there were special amendments to the Copyright Act to permit for a limited time and under certain conditions the recapture of works that might have escaped into the public domain, principally by aliens of countries with which we had been at war." Works published with notice of copyright or registered in unpublished form in the years 1964 through 1977 automatically had their copyrights renewed for a second term. Works published with notice of copyright or registered in unpublished form on or after January 1, 1923, and prior to January 1, 1964, had to be renewed during the 28th year of their first term of copyright to maintain copyright for a full 95-year term. With the exception of maps, music, and movies, the vast majority of works published in the United States before 1964 were never renewed for a second copyright term.

Works "prepared by an officer or employee of the U.S. government as part of that person's official duties" are automatically in the public domain by law. Examples include military journalism, federal court opinions, congressional committee reports, and census data. However, works created by a contractor for the government are still subject to copyright. Even public-domain documents may have their availability limited by laws limiting the spread of classified information. This rule does not apply to works of U.S. state and local governments, though the separate edict of government doctrine automatically places all state legislative enactments and court opinions, among other things, in the public domain.

The claim that "pre-1931 works are in the public domain" is correct only for published works; unpublished works are under federal copyright for at least the life of the author plus 70 years. For a work for hire, the copyright in a work created before 1978, but not theretofore in the public domain or registered for copyright, subsists from January 1, 1978, and endures for a term of 95 years from the year of its first publication, or a term of 120 years from the year of its creation, whichever expires first. If the work was created before 1978 but first published 1978–2002, the federal copyright will not expire before 2047.

Until the Berne Convention Implementation Act of 1988, the lack of a proper copyright notice would place an otherwise copyrightable work into the public domain, although for works published between January 1, 1978, and February 28, 1989, this could be prevented by registering the work with the Library of Congress before or within five years of publication and making a reasonable effort to add a proper notice to subsequent copies. After March 1, 1989, an author's copyright in a work begins when it is fixed in a tangible form; neither publication nor registration is required, and a lack of a copyright notice does not place the work into the public domain.

On January 1, 2019, published works from 1923 entered the public domain under the Copyright Term Extension Act. Works from 1923 that have been identified as entering the public domain in this period include The Murder on the Links, by Agatha Christie; The Great American Novel, by William Carlos Williams; the original silent version of the film The Ten Commandments, by Cecil B. DeMille; the hymn "Great Is Thy Faithfulness"; and the musical London Calling!, by Noël Coward. Whose Body? by Dorothy L. Sayers was published in the U.S. in 1923, but US copyright for this edition expired in 1951, when copyright was not renewed as required in the 28th year.

On January 1, 2020, published works from 1924 entered the public domain. Among the more notable entries into the public domain in 2020 was George Gershwin's "Rhapsody in Blue", a musical work that the Gershwin estate famously fought to keep in copyright.

Public domain
Since	Works	Examples
1998	Before 1923	Babbitt, The Beautiful and Damned, Nanook of the North
2019	From 1923	The Murder on the Links, Safety Last!, The Ten Commandments
2020	From 1924	A Passage to India, So Big, Greed, Sherlock Jr.
2021	From 1925	The Great Gatsby, The Freshman, The Big Parade
2022	From 1926	The Sun Also Rises, The Black Pirate
2023	From 1927	The Jazz Singer, Sunrise, Wings, Metropolis, Seventh Heaven
2024	From 1928	Steamboat Willie, The Crowd, The Wind
2025	From 1929	The Broadway Melody, The Cocoanuts, The Skeleton Dance
2026	From 1930	As I Lay Dying, All Quiet on the Western Front, Morocco

Since the public domain began expanding annually again in 2019, the month of January has typically seen a large number of public domain works uploaded to sites such as Project Gutenberg, Standard Ebooks, and Wikimedia Commons. Standard Ebooks usually releases a number of notable newly-public domain books each January 1, and films in the public domain are uploaded to Wikimedia Commons (and linked to their corresponding Wikipedia articles) around the same time.

=== Sound recordings ===
Very few sound recordings were in the public domain in the United States prior to 2022. Sound recordings fixed in a tangible form before February 15, 1972, have been generally covered by common law or in some cases by anti-piracy statutes enacted in certain states, not by federal copyright law, and the anti-piracy statutes typically have no duration limit. The 1971 Sound Recordings Act, effective 1972, and the 1976 Copyright Act, effective 1978, provide federal copyright for unpublished and published sound recordings fixed on or after February 15, 1972. Recordings fixed before February 15, 1972, are still covered, to varying degrees, by common law or state statutes. Any rights or remedies under state law for sound recordings fixed before February 15, 1972, are not annulled or limited by the 1976 Copyright Act until February 15, 2067. On that date, all sound recordings fixed before February 15, 1972, will go into the public domain in the United States.

For sound recordings fixed on or after February 15, 1972, the earliest year that any will enter the public domain in the U.S. will be 2043, and not in any substantial number until 2048. Sound recordings fixed and published on or after February 15, 1972, and before 1978, which did not carry a proper copyright notice on the recording or its cover entered the public domain on publication. From 1978 to March 1, 1989, the owners of the copyrights had up to five years to remedy this omission without losing the copyright. Since March 1, 1989, no copyright notice has been required.

In September 2018, the US Senate passed the Music Modernization Act, which modified the length of copyright protections for sound recordings and allowed for older sound recordings to enter the public domain prior to the original February 15, 2067 expiration date.

On January 1, 2022, all sound recordings published before 1923 entered the public domain – the first sound recordings to involuntarily lose copyright protection in US history. (Creators have always been free to surrender copyright protection and deed their sound recordings into the public domain, as Tom Lehrer would do later in 2022 after having cancelled his underlying songwriting copyrights in 2020.) Sound recordings published after 1923 have different copyright terms under the Music Modernization Act, as detailed below:

Sound recordings
Date of publication	Copyright length of sound recording
Before 1926	Public domain
1926 to 1946	100 years from publication
1947 to 1956	110 years from publication
1957 to 14 Feb 1972	15 Feb 2067
15 Feb 1972 to 31 Dec 1977	95 years from publication
1978 or later	Life of the Author + 70 years OR 95 years from publication for work for hire/work of corporate authorship.

Public domain
Since	Sound recordings from	Examples
2022	Before 1923	"Every Day Will Be Sunday When The Town Goes Dry," "April Showers"
2023	Declarations only	"The Vatican Rag", "The Elements"
2024	1923	"Downhearted Blues", "Yes! We Have No Bananas"
2025	1924	"Rhapsody in Blue"
2026	1925	"Oh, Lady Be Good!"

Note that this only applies to recordings and not lyrics/sheet music. For example, all intellectual property rights relating to the sheet music and lyrics to Rhapsody in Blue expired in 2020, when all written works published in 1924 entered the public domain. The recording itself, however, was protected until January 1, 2025.

=== Examples ===
In the United States, the images of Frank Capra's film It's a Wonderful Life (1946) entered into the public domain in 1974, because the copyright holder failed to file a renewal application with the Copyright Office during the 28th year after the film's release or publication. However, in 1993, Republic Pictures utilized the 1990 Supreme Court ruling in Stewart v. Abend to enforce its claim of copyright because the film was a derivative work of a short story that was under a separate, existing copyright, to which Republic owned the film adaptation rights, effectively regaining control of the work in its complete form. Currently, Paramount Pictures owns the film's copyrightable elements.

Charles Chaplin re-edited and scored his 1925 film The Gold Rush for reissue in 1942. Subsequently, the 1925 version fell into the public domain when Chaplin's company failed to renew its copyright in 1953, although the 1942 version is still under US copyright.

The distributor of the cult film Night of the Living Dead, after changing the film's title at the last moment before release in 1968, failed to include a proper copyright notice in the new titles, thereby immediately putting the film into the public domain after its release. This provision of US copyright law was revised with the United States Copyright Act of 1976, which allowed such negligence to be remedied within five years of publication.

A number of TV series in America have lapsed into the public domain, in whole or only in the case of certain episodes, giving rise to wide distribution of some shows on DVD. Series that have only certain episodes in the public domain include Petticoat Junction, The Beverly Hillbillies, The Dick Van Dyke Show, The Andy Griffith Show, The Lucy Show, Bonanza, Annie Oakley, and Decoy.

Laws may make some types of works and inventions ineligible for monopoly; such works immediately enter the public domain upon publication. Many kinds of mental creations, such as publicized baseball statistics, are never covered by copyright. However, any special layout of baseball statistics, or the like, would be covered by copyright law. For example, while a phone book is not covered by copyright law, any special method of laying out the information would be.

=== Copyright notice ===
In the past, a work would enter the public domain in the United States if it was released without a copyright notice. This was true prior to March 1, 1989, but is no longer the case. Any work (of certain, enumerated types) now receives copyright as soon as it is fixed in a tangible medium.

=== Computer Software Rental Amendments Act ===
There are several references to putting copyrighted work into the public domain. The first reference is actually in a statute passed by Congress, in the Computer Software Rental Amendments Act of 1990 (Public Law 101–650, 104 Stat. 5089 (1990)). Although most of the Act was codified into Title 17 of the United States Code, there is a very interesting provision relating to "public domain shareware" which was not, and is therefore often overlooked.

Sec. 805. Recordation of Shareware
(a) IN GENERAL— The Register of Copyrights is authorized, upon receipt of any document designated as pertaining to computer shareware and the fee prescribed by section 708 of title 17, United States Code, to record the document and return it with a certificate of recordation.
(b) MAINTENANCE OF RECORDS; PUBLICATION OF INFORMATION—The Register of Copyrights is authorized to maintain current, separate records relating to the recordation of documents under subsection (a), and to compile and publish at periodic intervals information relating to such recordations. Such publications shall be offered for sale to the public at prices based on the cost of reproduction and distribution.
(c) DEPOSIT OF COPIES IN LIBRARY OF CONGRESS—In the case of public domain computer shareware, at the election of the person recording a document under subsection (a), 2 complete copies of the best edition (as defined in section 101 of title 17, United States Code) of the computer shareware as embodied in machine-readable form may be deposited for the benefit of the Machine-Readable Collections Reading Room of the Library of Congress.
(d) REGULATIONS—The Register of Copyrights is authorized to establish regulations not inconsistent with law for the administration of the functions of the Register under this section. All regulations established by the Register are subject to the approval of the Librarian of Congress.

One purpose of this legislation appears to be to allow "public domain shareware" to be filed at the Library of Congress, presumably so that the shareware would be more widely disseminated. Therefore, one way to release computer software into the public domain might be to make the filing and pay the $20 fee. This could have the effect of "certifying" that the author intended to release the software into the public domain. It does not seem that registration is necessary to release the software into the public domain, because the law does not state that public-domain status is conferred by registration. Judicial rulings support this conclusion; see below.

By comparing paragraph (a) and (c), one can see that Congress distinguishes "public domain" shareware as a special kind of shareware. Because this law was passed after the Berne Convention Implementation Act of 1988, Congress was well aware that newly created computer programs (two years worth, since the Berne Act was passed) would automatically have copyright attached. Therefore, one reasonable inference is that Congress intended that authors of shareware would have the power to release their programs into the public domain. This interpretation is followed by the Copyright Office in 37 C.F.R. § 201.26.

=== Berne Convention Implementation Act ===
The Berne Convention Implementation Act of 1988 states in section twelve that the Act "does not provide copyright protection for any work that is in the public domain." The congressional committee report explains that this means simply that the Act does not apply retroactively.

Although the only part of the act that does mention "public domain" does not speak to whether authors have the right to dedicate their work to the public domain, the remainder of the committee report does not say that they intended copyright to be an indestructible form of property. Rather the language speaks about getting rid of copyright formalities in order to comply with Berne (non-compliance had become a severe impediment in trade negotiations) and making registration and marking optional, but encouraged. A fair reading is that the Berne Act did not intend to take away author's right to dedicate works to the public domain, which they had (by default) under the 1976 Act.

=== Section 203 of the Copyright Act ===
Although there is support in the statutes for allowing work to be dedicated to the public domain, there cannot be an unlimited right to dedicate work to the public domain because of a quirk of U.S. copyright law which grants the author of a work the right to cancel "the exclusive or nonexclusive grant of a transfer or license of copyright or of any right under a copyright" thirty-five years later, unless the work was originally a work for hire.

=== Case law ===
Another form of support comes from the case Computer Associates Int'l v. Altai, 982 F.2d 693, which set the standard for determining copyright infringement of computer software. This case discusses the public domain.

(c) Elements Taken from the Public Domain
Closely related to the non-protectability of scenes a faire, is material found in the public domain. Such material is free for the taking and cannot be appropriated by a single author even though it is included in a copyrighted work. ... We see no reason to make an exception to this rule for elements of a computer program that have entered the public domain by virtue of freely accessible program exchanges and the like. See 3 Nimmer Section 13.03 [F]; see also Brown Bag Software, slip op. at 3732 (affirming the district court's finding that "[p]laintiffs may not claim copyright protection of an ... expression that is, if not standard, then commonplace in the computer software industry."). Thus, a court must also filter out this material from the allegedly infringed program before it makes the final inquiry in its substantial similarity analysis.

This decision holds that computer software may enter the public domain through "freely accessible program exchanges and the like", or by becoming "commonplace in the computer industry." Relying only on this decision, it is unclear whether an author can dedicate their work to the public domain simply by labeling it as such, or whether dedication to the public domain requires widespread dissemination.

This could make a distinction in a CyberPatrol-like case, where a software program is released, leading to litigation, and as part of a settlement the author assigns their copyright. If the author has the power to release their work into the public domain, there would be no way for the new owner to stop the circulation of the program. A court may look on an attempt to abuse the public domain in this way with disfavor, particularly if the program has not been widely disseminated. Either way, a fair reading is that an author may choose to release a computer program to the public domain if he can arrange for it to become popular and widely disseminated.

In other cases, courts facing claims of copyright abandonment have borrowed from the law of personal property. In this context, abandonment is the intentional relinquishment of a legal interest as manifested by some overt act.

== See also ==
- Capitol Records, Inc. v. Naxos of America, Inc.
- Copyright status of work by the U.S. government
- Copyright status of works by subnational governments of the United States
- Copyright Term Extension Act
- Eldred v. Ashcroft
- Fair dealing
- Fair use
- List of countries' copyright length
- List of films in the public domain in the United States
- List of public domain projects
- Public Domain Enhancement Act
- Rule of the shorter term
- Uruguay Round Agreements Act
