= Copyright in the Dominican Republic =

The Dominican Republic is a signatory to the Berne Convention, and the basic law on copyright is contained in Law No. 65-00 on Copyright of August 21, 2000 as supplemented by the Regulations of Application of the Law No. 65-00 on Copyright, as enacted on March 14, 2001.
