= Post-colonial copyright crisis =

The post-colonial copyright crisis of the mid-1960s is a particular phenomenon relating to the impact of the decolonisation process on former colonies (especially British colonies) in terms of literary publishing after the end of the Second World War. Previously education regimes in colonial countries had generally been under the control of the occupying power. Educational texts were printed in the occupying country under copyright, often to the specification of the foreign ministry, and typically contained little knowledge that could foster independent scientific or technological development.

== Problems ==
Domestic production of textbooks, especially those in indigenous languages, was severely restricted in several ways. Copyright restrictions, the capital and resources required to establish and operate a print mill, and the shortage of indigenous‑language material resulting from low literacy rates contributed to the underdevelopment of post‑colonial education systems following decolonisation. UNESCO statistics show that in 1959, the Philippines and Burma each published 153 and 608 titles in their home languages respectively. A year later, statistics for India and Indonesia show 10,741 and 1,114 home language titles published respectively.

Shortage of learning materials in accessible languages soon presented the newly independent post-colonial governments with a problem. Due to the price-fixing actions of publishing cartels in London and New York, prices for educational materials, which were still under copyright, were far beyond the reach of ordinary people, and governments were unable to subsidise the quantity of books needed to construct a viable statewide education system. Pirating the necessary texts (a radical option) was also difficult, given a lack of printing presses, paper mills, and raw paper stock. Importing these materials also turned out to be prohibitively expensive.

== Attempted solutions ==
Developing nations aimed to revise the terms of the 1886 Berne Convention for the Protection of Literary and Artistic Works, which former colonial rulers had signed on their behalf. Their continued membership of the convention was in itself a tricky international legal question due to their newly independent status - no independent government had ever signed the document.

The Stockholm Revision Conference of 1967 provided developing countries with a chance to change the rules in favour of copyright-importing states. This group of 24 nations especially sought more flexible terms on copyright for materials destined for educational purposes. However, negotiations stalled as a result of pressure from British publishing interests, who did not want to give up any degree of control over lucrative international markets.

A Protocol Regarding Developing Countries was eventually agreed upon, but proved toothless, as it was non-binding. No developed, copyright exporting country signed or ratified it. Another opportunity arose four years later in 1971 at the Paris Revision Conference, where there was more success. Rather than risk losing members to the convention, a binding appendix was agreed upon which set out exceptions for developing countries. However, the effects were not far-reached, and problems with access to materials remained as student numbers grew.
