= Berne Convention Implementation Act of 1988 =

United States law

- Other short titles: H.R.4262 — 100th Congress
- Long title: To amend title 17, United States Code, to implement the Berne Convention for the Protection of Literary and Artistic Works, as revised at Paris on July 24, 1971, and for other purposes.

Citations
- Public law: Pub. L. 100–568
- Statutes at Large: 102 Stat. 2853

Codification
- Acts amended: Copyright Act of 1976

The Berne Convention Implementation Act of 1988 is a copyright act that came into force in the United States on March 1, 1989, making it a party to the Berne Convention for the Protection of Literary and Artistic Works.

== Context ==
The United States initially refused—for 102 years, from 1886 to 1988—to join the Berne Convention, as it would have required major changes in its copyright law, particularly:

(A) Moral rights,
(B) Copyright formalities, including registration, deposit, and mandatory copyright notice

At the same time, U.S. copyright experts seemed to acknowledge that the United States' approach to international copyright relations was flawed. For example, Barbara Ringer, a leading U.S. copyright official, remarked that until around 1955, the United States' "role in international copyright was marked by short-sightedness, political isolationism, and narrow economic self-interest".

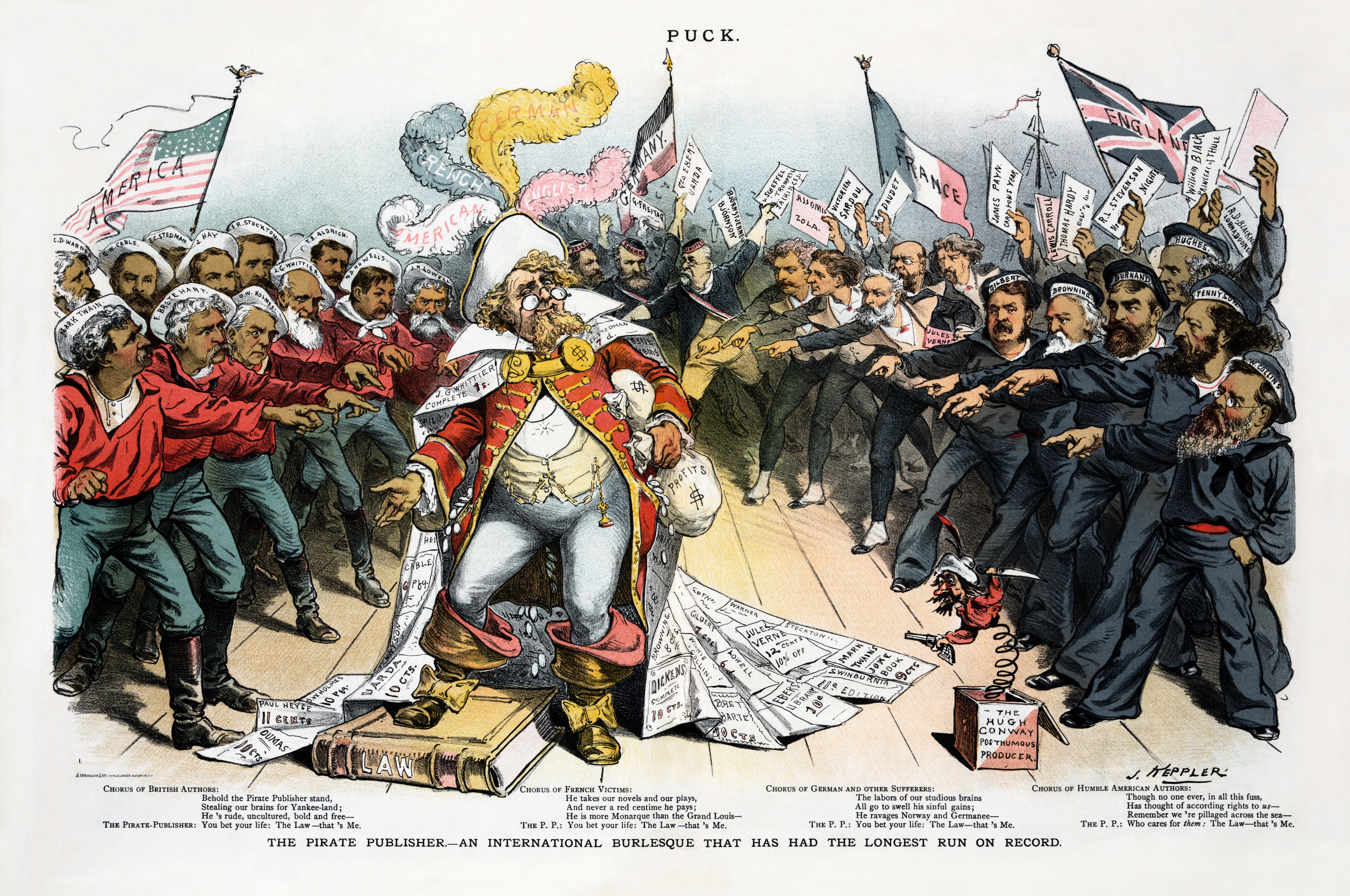
The Pirate Publisher—An International Burlesque that has the Longest Run on Record, from Puck, 1886, satirizes the ability of publishers to take works from one country and publish them in another without paying the original authors.

H. Sandison writes: "The roots of American isolationism are from the 1790 Copyright Act which protected books only if their authors were citizens or residents of the United States". Ringer observed that this meant U.S. publishers could copy the works of English authors like Charles Dickens and publish them cheaper in the new nation than U.S. authors could be published. This hurt the market for American books for 100 years and was only partly remedied in 1891, when the United States passed a limited international copyright law. Although the United States was not alone in denying copyright protection to nonresident foreigners, by waiting until 1988 to join the Berne Convention, the United States was one of the last industrial countries, having been "the only non-Unionist Western country", to join.

By ratifying the Berne Convention, the United States Congress signaled that it was taking a "minimalist approach to compliance" (emphasis original). Indeed, regarding both moral rights and formalities, the Implementation Act was limited; in short, the "major concession was that the United States finally, reluctantly, did away with copyright formalities". Furthermore, some copyright formalities, like requiring that a copy of the work be "deposited" at the Library of Congress, were preserved.

== See also ==
- United States copyright law
- Buenos Aires Convention
