= Morberg =

Morberg is a Swedish surname. Notable people with the surname include:

- Alida Morberg (born 1985), Swedish actress
- Bengt Morberg (1897–1968), Swedish Olympic gymnast
- Per Morberg (born Andersson in 1960), Swedish actor, chef, and news presenter
