= The Brothers Moberg =

Swedish twin brothers and organ builders (b. 1915)

- Born: Harry: March 5, 1915, Sandviken; Valter: March 5, 1915, Sandviken
- Died: Harry: March 15, 1992 (aged 77); Valter: December 21, 2006 (aged 91)
- Other name: Bröderna Moberg
- Occupation: Organ Builders
- Known for: Restoration work on historical organs

Harry and Valter Moberg were twin brothers that specialized in the construction and restoration of old organs in churches across Scandinavia.

== Background ==
The twin brothers were born in Sandviken, Sweden on March 5, 1915. Their parents, Engelbert and Alida Moberg, had musical interests and played a variety of instruments. Their older sibling Elsa, an educated pianist, was married to violinist John Vesterlund, who began organ building in the 1930s and allowed the Moberg brothers to learn from him. In 1933, Vesterlund's company began restoration work on an organ in Løvstabruk, built by Johan Niclas Cahman in 1728. The experience influenced the brothers' interest in historical organs. They met the organ historians Bertil Wester and later Einar Erici who were particularly interested in the mapping of old organs in Sweden.

The Moberg brothers started their own organ building company in 1941, becoming pioneers in restoring organs with historic value in Sweden. There were about 4000 organs in Sweden by 1950 having grown from 30 when record keeping began in the 1600s, 200 of which were classified as historically valuable by the Swedish National Heritage Board. With their co-worker Ville Pettersson, they have restored about 90 historical organs across Scandinavia together. Among their most famous works is the restoration of the organ at Åtvid's old church built by Jonas Wistenius in 1751, which was reconstructed to 70 percent. Albert Schweitzer has played on the restored organ and expressed his opinion positively about the reconstruction. The organ in Seglora church in Skansen, Stockholm was restored in 1963. The organ was built by Jonas Ekengren in 1777. The organ in Tjällmo church, built by Isac Risberg 1710, was restored in 1968.

The brothers recorded the sound of several historic organs and filmed several of their restorations. They also published articles in Church Musicians Magazine and Organ forums.

The work of the Moberg brothers was carried out on the basis of their conservation idea: "The purpose of preserving old church organs is to produce a complete line of organs from past time, where each preserved organ work must be a silent representative of its era and show as much as possible its master's personal and artistic characteristic, such as they were at the time of construction."

They documented all of their restorations and other major works with photographs and explanatory text about the performed works.

Their archives are currently available at the Swedish National Heritage Board in Stockholm.

== Works ==
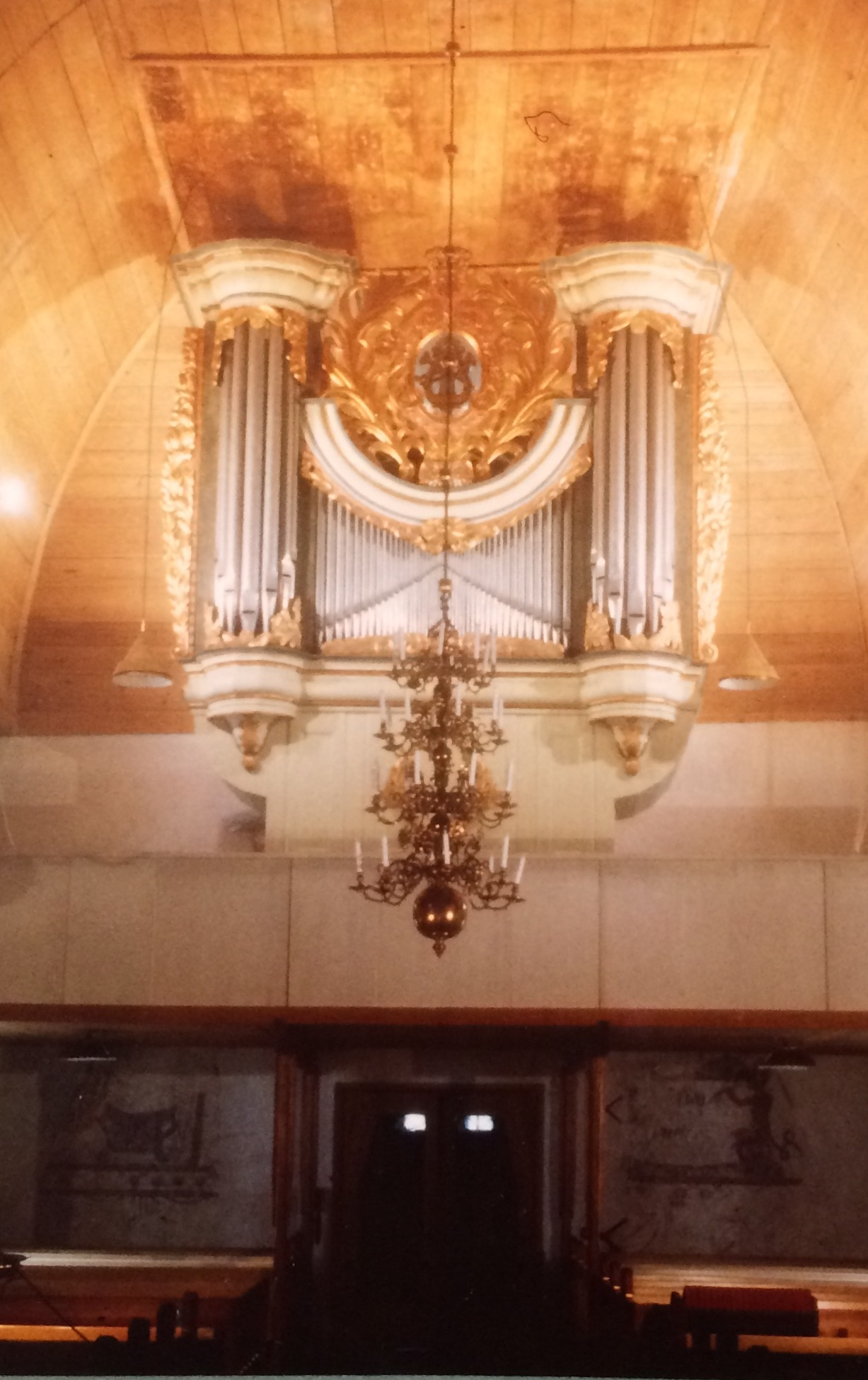
The façade of the Risberg organ in Tjällmo.

=== Sweden ===
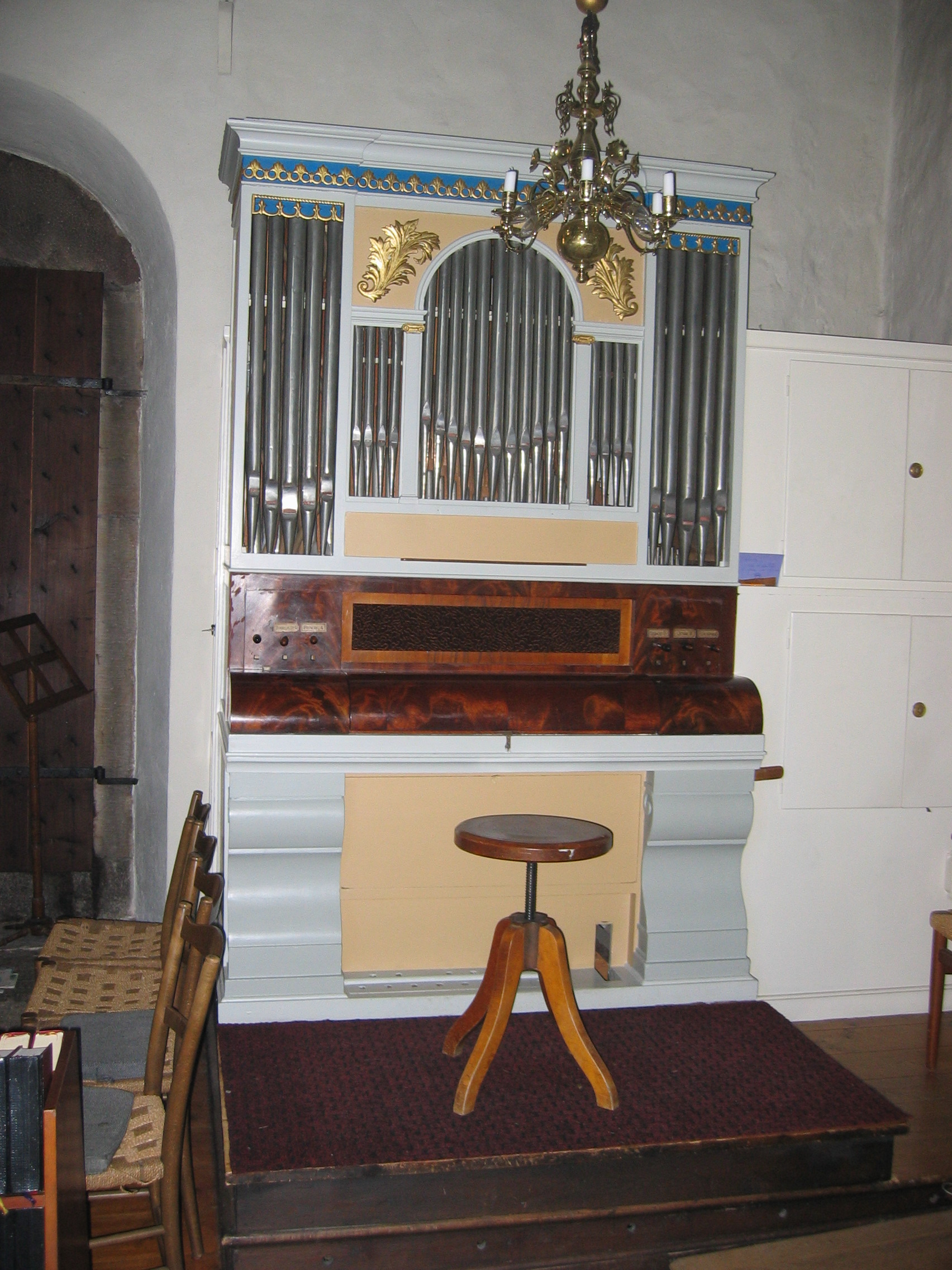
Hjälmseryd

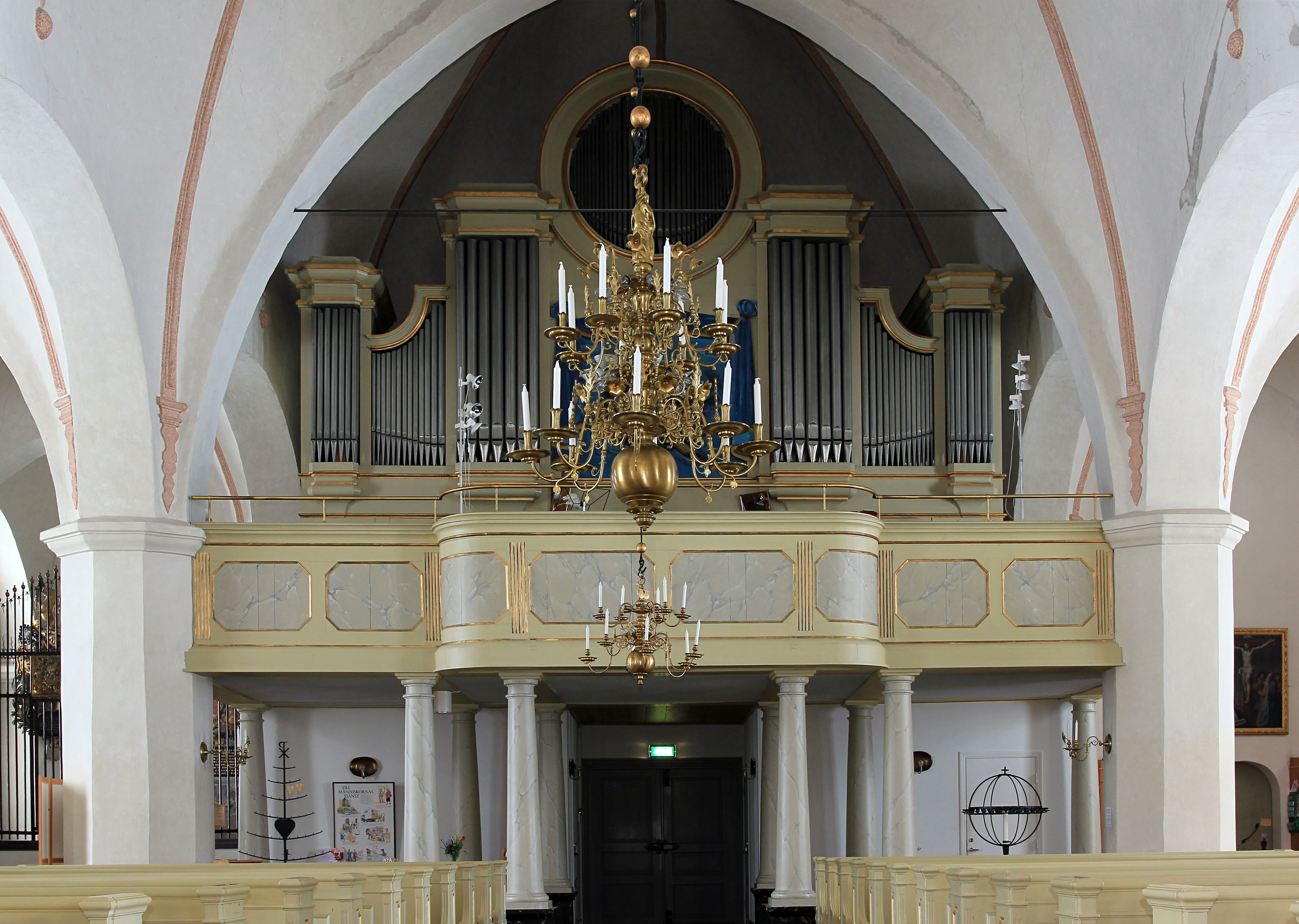
Söderbärke

The Old Organ in Aatvidaberg

Location	Year	Constructed by
Alvesta Church	1964	Pehr Schiörlin (1778)
Angarn Church	1970	Pehr Strand (1849)
Asks Church	1950	Olof Hammarberg (1929)
Avesta Church	1989	A Magnussons Orgelbryggeri (1938)
Balingsta Church	1974	Åkerman & Lund (1898)
Björskog Church	1988	Eskil Lundén (1914)
Bladåker Church	1952	Johan Lambert Larsson (1842)
Botilsäter Church	1974	A P Lokrantz (1921)(facade from 1882)
Brunnby Church	1980	Setterquist & Son 1912
Bäckebo (Uppland)	1952	Johannes Magnusson 1848
Bälinge Church, Uppland	1955	Eisenmenger & Herman 1632. Facade by Mårten Redtmer who decorated the Vasa
Böhmiska positivitet, Music and Theater Museum, Stockholm	1964	Anton Streit (ca. 1700)
Börje Church	1958	Daniel Wallenström (1856)
Djursdala Church	1965	Anders Jonsson 1841; Removal of crescendo cabinet
Edebo Church (Stockholm Municipality)	1951 och 1983	Built after recommendation by Berg in Alunda. Removed 1926, reinstated 1951 in its original state by the Moberg brothers.
Old Church of Enviken	1950	Gustaf Wilhelm Becker (1872)
Eskilsäters Church	1949	Johan Everhardt Jr (1820)
Flisby Church	1974	Sven Nordström 1856
Folkströms Chapel (Hällestads Parish)	1953	Johan Agerwall (1700)
Folkärna Church	1984	Johannes Magnusson 1931; Facade from 1853
Forssa Church (Södermanland)	1984	Setterquist & Son 1879
Gammalkils Church	1975	Pehr Schiörlin 1806 (Albert Schweitzer played the organ)
Garpenbergs Church	1969	Setterquist & Son 1904 (Organ above the altar)
Grythyttans Church	1987	Setterquist & Son 1904. Facade from1780
Trinity Church Gävle	1955	Setterquist & Son 1889, John Vesterlund 1939
Vasa School, Gävle	1983	Pehr Larsson Åkerman 1876
Immanuel Church, Gävle	1962	E H Eriksson 1906
Soldiers Church, Gävle	1984	E H Eriksson (1918)
Harakers Church	1967	Pehr Lund (1930)
Hjälmseryds Old Church	1953	Johannes Magnusson 1850~
Häradshammars Church	1954	Jonas Fredric Schiörlin 1821
Jättendals Church	1963	Lars Niclas Nordquist 1839
Trinity Church, Karlskrona	1961-1962	Pehr Zacharias Strand (1827)
Kristinehamns Church	1982	Setterquist & Son (1921) (Facade from 1858)
Kuddby Church	1954-1955	Sven & Erik Nordström (1882)
Kvarsebo Church	1949, 1974	Johan Lund (1852)
Lannaskede Old Church	1952	Lars Solberg (1734)
Linköping Cathedral	1975-1976	Setterquist & Son (1929) (Facade from 1723)
Långseruds Church	1982	Eskil Lundén (1917)
Njutångers Church	1940~	Th J Trayser XXXX harmonium
Normlösa Church	1954	Sven Nordström (1854)
Norra Solberga Church	1972	Nils Ahlstrand (1836)
Nyeds Church	1955-1956	Elias Witting (1707 Choir Organ)
Nysätra Church, Uppland	1973	Per Gullbergsson & Jonas Wengström (1839)
Oslättfors Chapel	1961	Brothers Moberg (1944)
Rasbokil Church	1971	Pehr Zacharias Strand (1829)
Rönö Church	1975	Gustaf Andersson & Son (1855)
Sandviken Baptist Church	1977-1978	Olof Hedlund (1739)
Sandvik Church	1976	Åkerman & Lund (1931)
Seglora Church, Skansen, Stockholm	1962-1963	Jonas Ekengren (1778)
Skirö Church	1961	Johannes Magnusson (1857)
Skällvik Church	1964	Jonas Wistenius (1762)
Snavlunda Church	1980	Åkerman & Lund (1943)
Svartnäs Church	1956	Jonas Wängström (1848)
Svinnegarns Church	1957	Carl Wåhlström 1769
Svärdsjö Church	1964	Åkerman & Lund (1943) Facade from 1738
Sätra brunn Church	1953	Daniel Wallenström (1867)
Söderbärke Church	1956	Niclas Furtwängler & Hammer (1923) (facade from 1738)
Söderbärke Church	1956	Niclas Söderström (1795)
Teda Church	1949	Pehr Niclas Forssberg (1785)
Tjällmo Church	1968 - 1969	Isac Risberg (1710)
Trönö Old Church	1968	P Z Strand 1800 (Pehr Zacharias Strand)
Trönö New Church	1971	Åkerman & Lund (1895)
Tåby Church	1954	Sven Nordström (1847)
Ulrika Church	1970	Johan Niclas Cahman (1734)
Utö Church	1972	Olof Hedlund (1745)
Vallerstads Church	1950	Nils Ahlstrand (1841)
Valö Church	1971	Gustaf Andersson (1831)
Venjans Church	1990	Setterquist & Son (1917)
Virestad organ in Smålands museum, Växjö	1953	Hans Heinrich Cahman (1690)
Voxna Church	1988	Setterquist & Son (1888)
Voxtorps Church, Jönköping	1959	Johan Nikolaus Söderling (1852)
Vårdinge Church	1979	Setterquist & Son (1938) (facade from 1844)
Värmskogs Church	1959-1960	E A Setterquist (1857)
Värmskogs Parish House	1961	Nyströms harmonium (1869)
Västra Eneby Church	1975	Sven Nordström (1850)
Yxnerums Church	1959	C M Ringström (1826. Inspection and removal of crescendo cabinet)
Åtvids Old Church	1957	Jonas Wistenius (1751) (Reconstruction. Albert Schweitzer has played on the organ)
Österfärnebo Church	1973	E H Eriksson (1906)
Östervik Chapel, Kristinehamn	1973	Th J Trayser (1872 harmonium)
Östra Ryds Church, Östergötland	1966	Lars Strömblad (1777, reconstruction)
Östra Skrukeby Church	1963	Pehr Schiörlin (1794)
Östra Ämterviks Church	1971	Andreas Jönsson (1847)

=== Norway ===
Location	Year	Constructed by
First Methodist Church (Oslo)	1987	Jörgensen Orgelfabrik 1920
Tvedestrand	1983	Olsen & Jörgensen (1920~)
Tylldalen	1982	(German Firm, 1920~)

=== Finland ===
Location	Year	Constructed by
Nagu	1977	Olof Schwan (1791)
Nystad	1978	Marcussen & Son (1865)

=== Constructions ===
Location	Year	Notes
Faringe Church	1943	
Gävle, Bomhus	1957	
Swedish Order of Freemasons, Gävle	1957	
Oslättsfors Chapel	1944	
Saint Anna	1944	Built together with John Vesterlund under the same company name AB Kyrkorglar
Uppsala Public School Seminarium	1947	Initiated by Oskar Sundström in 1946 and completed by the Brothers Moberg in 1947

=== Films ===
Location	Year	Notes
Seglora Church, Skansen, Stockholm	1963	
Tjällmo	1969	

=== Sound Recordings ===
Location	Year	Notes
Tjällmo	1968, 1969, 1970, 1971	
Brunnby		
Hedlund Organ in Sandviken Inauguration	1979	
Åtvid Old Church	1957	
Skällvik	1969	
Jonsered	Unknown	
Sandviken Church Radio Recordings	Unknown	
Häradshammar Folkström Chapel	Unknown	
Jonsberg	Unknown	
Haraker	1961	
Alvesta	Unknown	
Karlskrona Trinity Church	Unknown	
