= Moberg v. 33T LLC =

Moberg v. 33T LLC was a 2009 case, where the verdict was that a photo posted on a foreign internet site is not a US work.

The Swedish photographer Håkan Moberg sued the Delaware company 33T, LLC over copyright infringement over unauthorised use of photos he published on a German website in 2004. The defendant used Moberg's photos as stock photos in some of their website designs. When the cease-and-desist was ignored Håkan Moberg sued 33T over copyright infringement and violation of the DMCA. The defendant claimed that by making the images available online they would be published in the United States and that would make it a United States work, and that they needed to be registered with the United States Copyright Office. The court rejected that and said that it would "overextend and pervert" U.S. copyright law and be contrary to the goals of the Berne Convention. The court also stated that if anything published online was a US work it would make US citizens able to infringe foreign works without fear of retribution and that it would be contrary to US copyright law: "the United States copyright laws, in accord with the Berne Convention, provide for protection of foreign works in the United States without requiring the artists to undertake any formalities in the United States".

== See also ==
- Timbaland plagiarism controversy
