= Copyright formalities =

Legal requirements to get a copyright

Copyright formalities are legal (generally statutory) requirements needed to obtain a copyright in a particular jurisdiction. Common copyright formalities include copyright registration, copyright renewal, copyright notice, and copyright deposit.

== Benefits and critiques ==
Copyright formalities had certain benefits to users and holders of copyrights. First, they made determination of copyright status fairly easy. Copyright notice requirements—such as placing a notice of copyright on the work itself, along with the copyright holder, and the date of copyright—meant that any work could readily be determined to be in copyright simply by looking for the copyright notice. Copyright registration and renewal requirements meant that records of copyright owners were centrally located and made available; this facilitated licensing arrangements, and contacting the holders. It also provided authoritative records about who owned the copyright, in case of disputes.

However, copyright formalities were viewed as an unnecessary burden on creators—mostly authors at the end of the 19th century. Authors who failed to comply with some particular aspect of a formality—for instance, placing the notice in the wrong place or in the wrong order, or failing to renew a copyright in a timely fashion—would lose their copyright. Consequently, Victor Hugo and other authors agitated for the elimination of copyright formalities toward the end of the 19th century. In response to their efforts, the 1908 Berlin text of the Berne Convention forbade treaty signatories from conditioning copyright on formalities, shifting copyright from a system of application (registration) to automatic copyright on fixation.

== Shift away from formalities ==
Requirements for meeting copyright formalities were largely eliminated in many countries with the adoption of the Berne Convention, which granted a copyright for a creative work automatically as soon as the work was "fixed". Berne was first adopted in 1886 by eight countries, mostly in Europe. Acceptance grew over the course of the 20th century. (See List of parties to the Berne Convention.) The United States, a notable late holdout, joined Berne effective March 1, 1989, with the passage of the Berne Convention Implementation Act of 1988; China, another notable holdout, joined Berne in 1992.

With the adoption of Berne and its successor treaties, requiring formalities to obtain a copyright has fallen out of practice around the world.

== Renewed interest in formalities ==
However, the system of automatic copyright on fixation has been cited as one of the factors behind the growth of the so-called "orphan works" problem. For instance, the U.S. Copyright Office's 2006 report on orphan works cited the shift away from formalities as one of the critical factors behind the creation of orphan works.

Consequently, some scholars and policy advocates (such as law professor and activist Lawrence Lessig and U.S. Representative Zoe Lofgren) have called for returning to a system of registration requirements and possibly other formalities such as copyright notice. UC Berkeley's Law School held a conference in 2013 on the question of "Reform(aliz)ing Copyright for the Internet Age?", noting that

"Formalities, which in the past three decades have largely disappeared from American copyright law, may be about to stage a comeback. ... [R]ecent research on formalities suggests that we can get many of the benefits that formalities promise for a more efficient and focused copyright law, without the problems that led us to do away with them in the first place."
