= Einar Erici =

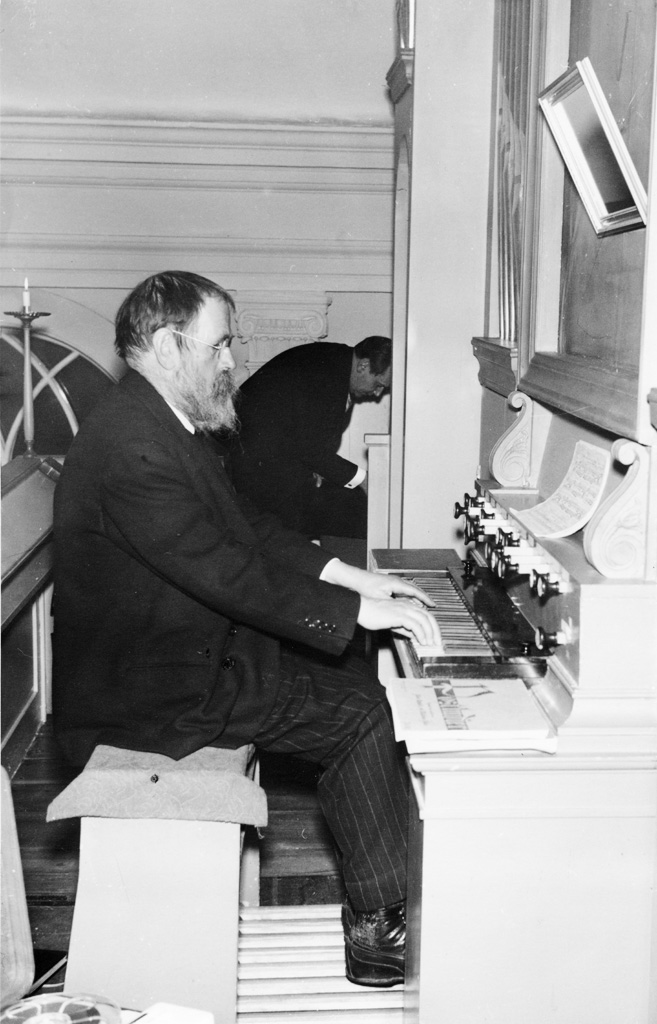
Photo of Einar Erici

Einar Erici (1885–1965) was a Swedish doctor, researcher of musical organs and amateur photographer. He worked at a tuberculosis hospital in Stockholm and ran a private medical practice. He became an expert on church organs and organ builders. He conducted archive investigation on the topic and established an inventory of Swedish organs from before 1850. His collection of photographs of church organs has been archived as well as his photographs of people in nature, or at work.

== Awards ==
- 1947 - Corresponding member of the Royal Danish History of History and the Antiquity Academy
- 1950 - Associate no. 199 by the Royal Academy of Music
- 1959 - The Medal for the Tone Art Promotion
- 1962 - Philosophy of Honorary Doctor at Uppsala University
