= Reservation of rights =

American legal practice

A reservation of rights, in American legal practice, is a statement that an individual, company, or other organization is intentionally retaining full legal rights to warn others of those rights. The notice avoids later claims that one waived legal rights that were held under a contract, copyright law, or any other applicable law.

The term is used in connection with copyright law. The term "reservation of rights" (particularly a "reservation of rights letter”) is often used in connection with insurance claims. The insurance company issues a reservation of rights letter stating that it may deny coverage for some or all of the claim even while the company is investigating the claim or beginning to treat the claim as if it were covered. If the insurance company later decides to deny coverage, it cites the original reservation of rights as the warning that it might do so.

An insurer’s reservation of rights is an important legal step, particularly in the context of liability insurance. The insurer may provide a defense to the insured, seemingly protecting the insured from the serious liabilities that may result from a civil suit. The liability insurer is alerting the insured defendant that insurance may ultimately not cover the resulting liability, or a portion of the liability.

A reservation of rights by a liability insurance company is an expression of the insurer’s agreement to defend its policyholder with the limiting condition that it does not waive any right to later deny coverage under the terms of insurance contract. A reservation of rights permits an insurer to fulfill its broad duty to defend while avoiding waiver, estoppel, or forfeiture of rights or being bound by a judgment entered against its policyholder and serves to warn the policyholder to take steps to protect oneself from the reserving insurer. An insurer that reserves its rights may recover reimbursement from its own policyholder certain sums spent for the costs of defense and the costs of settlement. A right that does not already exist may not be created by reserving it. A valid reservation of rights does not require the policyholder’s consent.
