= German Historical Museum =

German history museum in Berlin

- Deutsches Historisches Museum

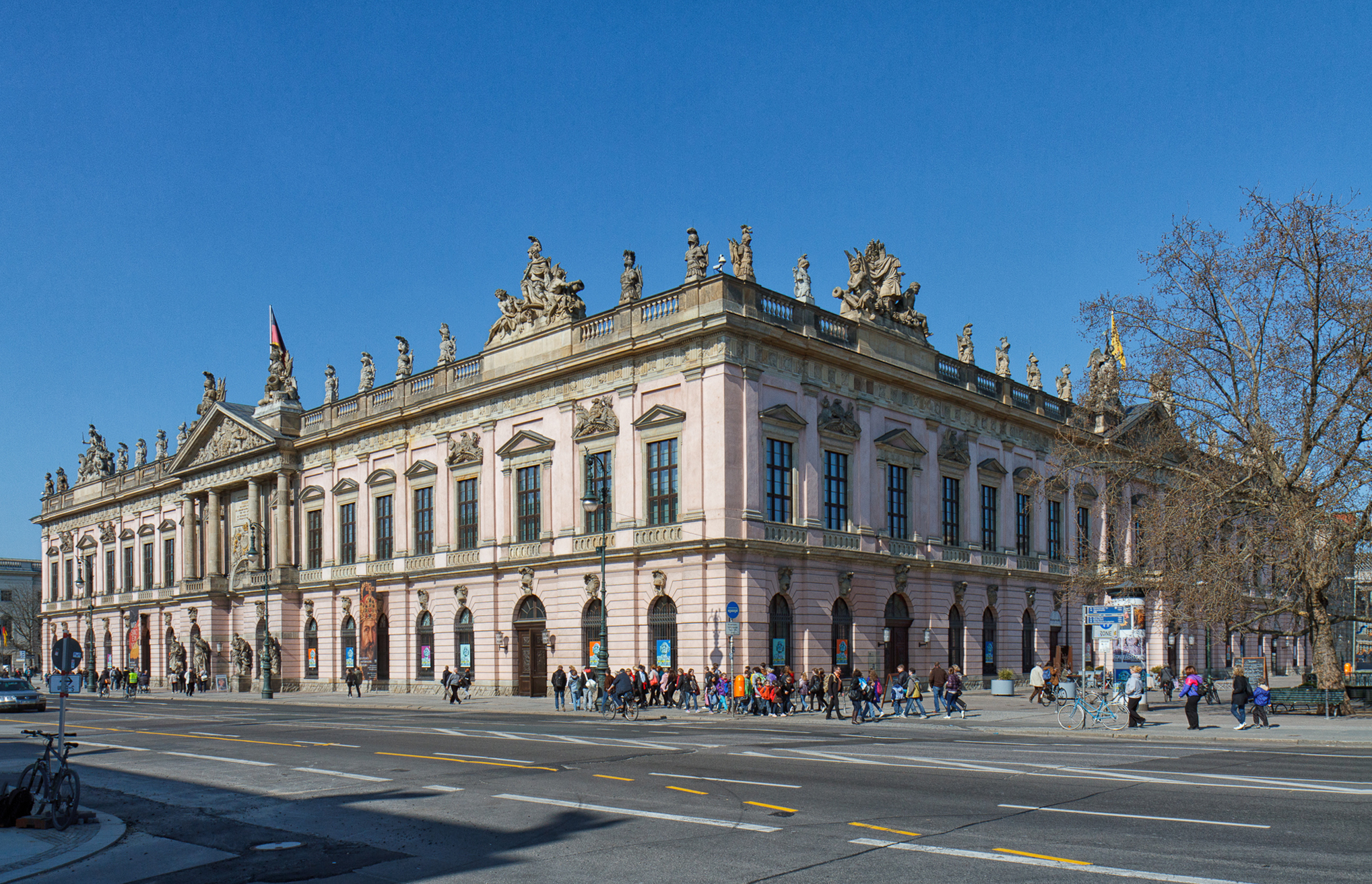
- Façade of the Zeughaus, the museum's main building
- Established: 28 October 1987
- Location: Berlin, Germany
- Coordinates: 52°31′05″N 13°23′49″E
- Type: History museum
- President: Raphael Gross
- Website: www.dhm.de/en/

Deutsches Historisches Museum, Berlin

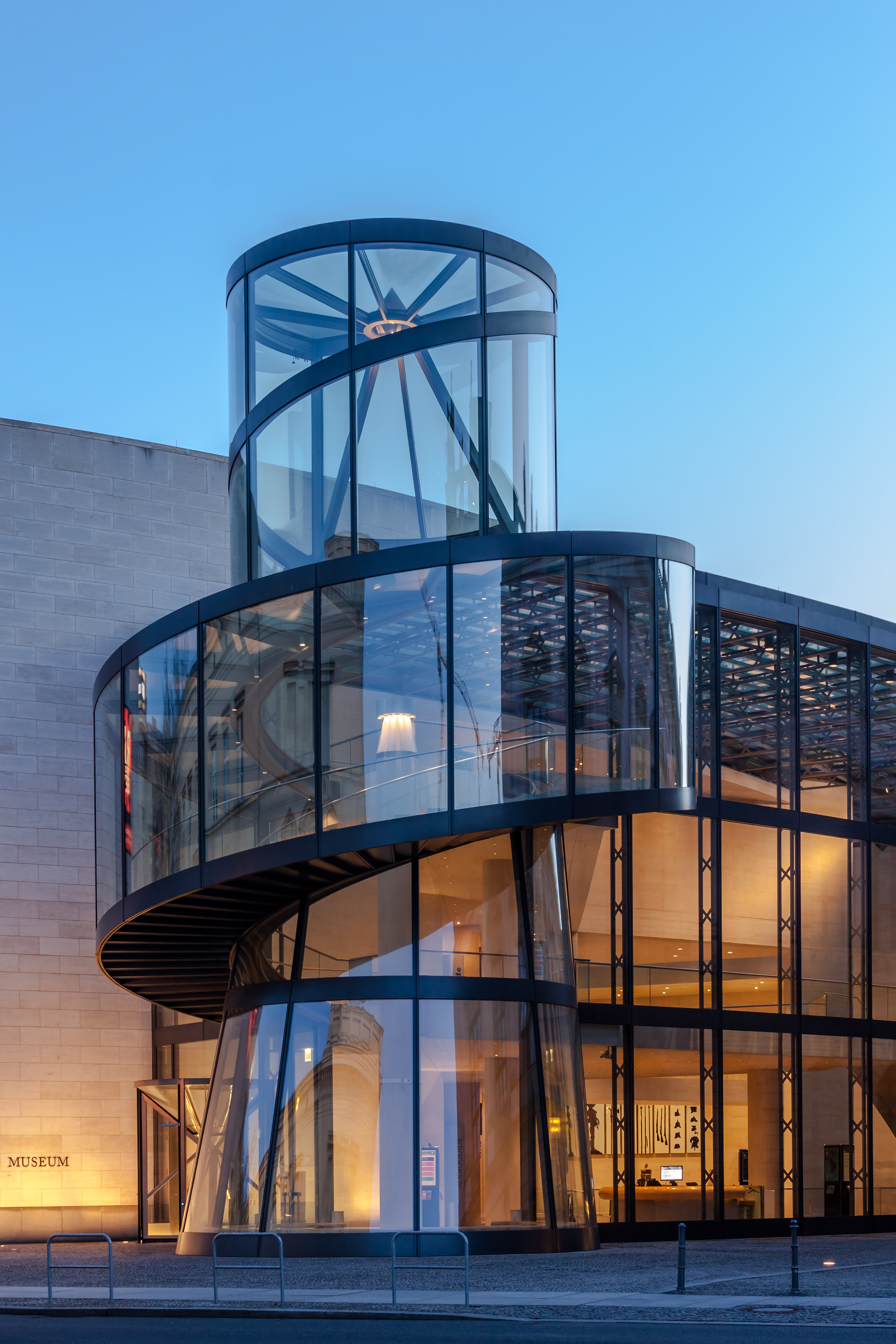
The extension of the museum

The German Historical Museum (German: Deutsches Historisches Museum), known by the acronym DHM, is a museum in Berlin, Germany devoted to German history. It describes itself as a place of "enlightenment and understanding of the shared history of Germans and Europeans". It is often viewed as one of the most important museums in Berlin and is one of the most frequented. The museum is located in the 17th-century Zeughaus (Note: The Zeughaus was closed for needed renovations in 2021 and is expected to reopen in 2031. The I.M. Pei building remains open.) (armoury) on the Unter den Linden, just across the Spree River from Museum Island. The museum's attached Exhibition Hall was designed by I. M. Pei in the late 20th century. The Zeughaus is closed for renovation, while the Exhibition Hall remains open.

The German Historical Museum is under the legal form of a foundation registered by the Federal Republic of Germany. Its highest-ranking body is the Board of Trustees (Kuratorium) with representatives of the federal government, the German Bundestag (Parliament) and the governments of the German Länder, or states.

== Founding and history ==
The museum was founded on 28 October 1987, on the occasion of the 750th anniversary of the founding of Berlin; it was inaugurated in the Reichstag building in former West Berlin. After the success of an exhibition on Prussia, which was shown in the Martin-Gropius-Bau in 1981, the then Governing Mayor of (West) Berlin, Richard von Weizsäcker, commissioned four prominent historians – Hartmut Boockmann, Eberhard Jäckel, Hagen Schulze and Michael Stürmer – to prepare a memorandum, which appeared in January 1982 under the title Deutsches Historisches Museum in Berlin. The project enjoyed great support from Federal Chancellor Helmut Kohl, who termed the founding of a German historical museum in Berlin a national priority of European importance in his speech on the State of the Nation before the German Bundestag on 27 February 1985. Kohl wanted the German Historical Museum to collect the most fascinating objects to reflect German history. His intention was to establish historical contextualization, because for him Nazi Germany was merely a period of time in Germany's long and rich past.

A commission was established, consisting of 16 leading historians, art historians, and museum directors to work out a concept for the museum in 1985/1986 and put it up for discussion in public hearings in 1986. The final version became the basis for the founding of the Deutsches Historisches Museum abbreviated DHM. The core of the museum's brief was to present German history in an international context. Multi-perspective perceptions aimed to encourage an understanding of the viewpoint of others in order to allow for a high level of reflection on history and culture in a time of the internationalisation of everyday life and the globalisation of work and commerce. On 28 July 1987, the partnership agreement was signed between the Federal Republic of Germany and the state of (West) Berlin concerning the establishment of the temporary trusteeship of the German Historical Museum as a private limited company.

Originally the museum was to be located near the Reichstag Building at the Spreebogen, the government complex at the bend of the River Spree. The architecture competition for the project was won by the Italian architect Aldo Rossi in 1988. However, in 1989 the fall of the Berlin Wall led to a change of plans: on the day of reunification 3 October 1990, the Federal Government transferred the collection and premises of the former Museum for German History to the DHM. The last government of the GDR had already dissolved that museum in September 1990 and made its property and contents available to the DHM. And thus the Zeughaus of 1695, the oldest building on Unter den Linden, became the seat of the German Historical Museum. The first exhibitions were shown in the Zeughaus in September 1991. The DHM began expanding its collections shortly after its founding. Opening in December 1994, the former Permanent Exhibition, then entitled German History in Images and Testimonials, presented an initial cross-section of the collection with more than 2000 exhibits.

The façade of the Zeughaus was restored between 1994 and 1998 on the basis of historical documents. The building was closed from 1998 until 2003 while extensive restoration measures were carried out by the architectural office of Winfried Brenne. In the course of the construction of the new adjacent museum hall by I. M. Pei between 1998 and 2003, glass roofing was once more installed above the Schlüterhof, the inner courtyard with the masks by Andreas Schlüter. The new building by I. M. Pei with a surface area of 2,700 m^{2} (29,000 ft^{2}) on four floors, and structurally engineered by Leslie E. Robertson Associates, was opened for temporary exhibitions in 2003. The Permanent Exhibition German History in Images and Artefacts was inaugurated in the Zeughaus by Federal Chancellor Angela Merkel on 2 June 2006.

As of 30 December 2008 the DHM assumed the legal form of a Public Law Foundation of the Federal Government (Stiftung öffentlichen Rechts des Bundes). Founded in 2009 to establish a centre for the remembrance and documentation of flight and expulsion, the Stiftung Flucht, Vertreibung, Versöhnung (Foundation Flight, Expulsion, Reconciliation) is under the aegis of the German Historical Museum.

== Directors ==
General Director of the Museum and President of the Foundation:

- Christoph Stölzl (1987–1999)
- Hans Ottomeyer (2000–2011)
- Alexander Koch (2011–2016)
- Raphael Gross (2017–present)

== Facilities ==
=== Exhibition halls ===
The museum's main building, the Zeughaus, closed on 28 June 2021 for extensive renovations and a complete renewal of the museum's Permanent Exhibition on the history of Germany. It is not expected to reopen before 2031.

The four floors of the smaller adjacent I. M. Pei Exhibition Hall remain open, hosting temporary exhibitions.

=== Library ===
The specialised research library on German and general history as well as museum work contains more than 225,000 volumes, including 13,000 rare books, 40,000 volumes of magazines and newspapers, 5,000 volumes of militaria and 15,000 museum catalogues. The public reference library is located behind the Zeughaus in the museum's administrative building, which had belonged to the Prussian credit union Preußische Central-Genossenschaftskasse from 1899 to 1945 and later to the GDR state-run company Minol.

=== Cinema ===
The Zeughauskino, a movie theatre seating 164 guests, is an integral part of the German Historical Museum and is located in the Zeughaus. It has a separate entrance on the Kupfergraben side of the building. It is a listed building, owing to its interior design being an example of early 1960s architecture.

Its main aim is to bring together historical and film-historical questions in a programme that is marked by film series to accompany exhibitions as well as thematic retrospectives.

Since 2004 and as of 2022 the Berlin International Film Festival has used Zeughauskino a venue for "Retrospective and Homage" screenings, which have been organised by the Deutsche Kinemathek – Museum für Film und Fernsehen.

== Collections ==
The collection reflects the history of the museum. The history of Prussia is covered in detail, because the Zeughaus use to house the Prussian military museum founded in 1883. In 1950 the Zeughaus was designated for the central history museum of the German Democratic Republic (GDR) to convey a socialist view of history in East Berlin. Therefore the objects on display relay the emergence of communism as social movement in everyday life. Since the German Historical Museum was established, about 7,000 objects have been added every year to expand the collections. After the German reunification 1989-1991 the German Historical Museum has established a permanent exhibition on German history which is accepted by German citizens.

=== Sections ===
Everyday Life Culture I
Technical and medical products and instruments, Household objects, product advertising: circa 70,000 objects
Everyday Life Culture II
Fashion, costumes, badges, religious articles: circa 45,000 objects
Everyday Life Culture III
Toys, postcards, political objects, special inventory: circa 40,000 objects
Old and valuable prints
Prints from 15th century – 20th century: circa 25,000 objects
Documents I
Deeds, broadsheets, flyer and map collections, autographs, Seals and albums up to 1914: circa 50,000 objects
Documents II
Photo albums, newspapers, flyers, propaganda materials, Maps and autographs since 1914: circa 120,000 objects
Picture archive
Estates of photographers and picture agencies, circa 500.000 photographic prints
Film collection
850 films
Applied arts and sculptures up to 1900
Furniture, ceramics, glass and metal art, design: circa 6,000 objects
Print collection
on the history of events from the 16th to the 20th century, Portrait engraving collection from the 15th to the 20th century: circa 100,000 prints
Art I
Paintings up to 1900: 857 objects
Art II/ Photo collection
Paintings and sculptures from the 20th and 21st centuries: circa 3,000 objects as well as 20,000 photographs
Militaria I
Old weapons and armour, military equipment: circa 20,000 objects
Militaria II
Uniforms, flags, medals and decorations, military prints: circa 30,000 objects
Numismatics
circa 80,000 objects, circa 15,000 securities
Posters
Artistic posters 1896-1938 from the Hans Sachs Collection, political posters 1920-1960 from the Wolf Collection, and GDR posters: circa 80,000 objects. In 2012, following a court decision, the heirs of Hans Sachs were granted possession of his collection which had been expropriated from Sachs by the Nazis in 1938.

== Multaka: Museum as Meeting Point ==
In 2015, the museum started a new project for Arabic- and Persian-speaking refugees and other Muslim visitors titled "Multaka - Museum as Meeting Point". This intercultural project organizes guided tours for refugees and migrants designed and offered for free by specially trained guides. The visitor-centered discussions with migrants in their language are focused on the historical origin and history of acquisition of cultural objects, including the visitors' own understanding of their country's cultural heritage. In 2019 the four founding museums in Berlin joined six similar museums in the United Kingdom, Italy, Greece and Switzerland, creating the international Multaka network.

== Online database and picture archive ==
The German Historical Museum has the most extensive object database of all museums in Germany that can be consulted on the Internet. The collections of the museum are recorded and administered in the database. It currently comprises around 500,000 objects and provides digital photos of some 70 percent of these objects. Image reproduction rights for commercial purposes are managed by the DHM picture archive, which charges industry-standard usage fees.

=== LeMO ===
In cooperation with the Haus der Geschichte der Bundesrepublik Deutschland in Bonn the German Historical Museum operates a wide-ranging Internet service called LeMO (Lebendiges virtuelles Museum Online, or Living virtual Museum Online), with information on German history from 1871 to the present. More than 30,000 HTML pages, 165,000 pictures as well as audio and video clips are available on the Web.
