= Copyright on the content of patents and in the context of patent prosecution =

The copyright status of the content of patent applications and patents may vary from one legal system to another. Whether scientific literature can be freely copied for the purpose of patent prosecution is also a matter for discussion.

== Copyright status of the content of patent applications and patents ==
=== Germany ===
In Germany, published patents can be freely copied so long as they are correctly cited, and the copies do not alter the patent contents.

=== Switzerland ===
Swiss copyright law expressly exempts patent documents from copyright protection.

=== United Kingdom ===
Prior to 1 August 1989, the contents of patents filed in the United Kingdom were protected under crown copyright; however, the government declared in 1969 that it did not intend to enforce its copyright under "normal circumstances". Copyright on patents filed since that date lies with the applicants. There is an exemption allowing patent contents to be reproduced for the purpose of "disseminating information", but other uses are prohibited without a license from the copyright holder.

=== United States ===
The website of the United States Patent and Trademark Office states that "the text and drawings of a patent are typically not subject to copyright restrictions," and similar views have been published by patent attorneys. As one unpublished academic working paper on the topic of copyright application to patents notes, however, there is no law exempting U.S. patents from copyright, but there is also almost no published literature or case law on the topic.

According to the Compendium of U.S. Copyright Office Practices, the U.S. Copyright Office may register a claim to copyright in a patent or a patent application, provided that the work contains a sufficient amount of original authorship. The copyrighted work might consist of the written description for an invention or the drawings or photographs contained in the patent. Likewise, the Office may register a claim to copyright in articles, publications, or other non-patent literature that may be submitted with a patent application. However, as with any other copyrighted work, the copyright in a patent, a patent application, or non-patent literature does not extend to any "idea, procedure, process, system, method of operation, concept, principle, or discovery" that may be disclosed in these works. 17 U.S.C. § 102(b).

A patent applicant may include a copyright notice or mask work notice, but only if it also includes the following authorization, expressly permitting the reproduction of the patent:

A portion of the disclosure of this patent document contains material which is subject to (copyright or mask work) protection. The (copyright or mask work) owner has no objection to the facsimile reproduction by anyone of the patent document or the patent disclosure, as it appears in the Patent and Trademark Office patent file or records, but otherwise reserves all (copyright or mask work) rights whatsoever.

Notably, the copyright notice itself is optional, and there is no requirement that the authorization be included in the absence of such a notice.

== Copyright law and the use of non-patent literature in patent prosecution ==
=== United States ===
A related, but different, issue is whether copyrighted scientific literature, sometimes referred to as "non-patent literature" (NPL), can be freely copied for submission to the USPTO and more generally in the context of patent prosecution. The official position of the USPTO is that providing copies of non-patent literature to the USPTO for the purposes of patent prosecution is protected fair use provided that the applicant obtained the copies properly. In 2012, two lawsuits were brought challenging this practice. Both lawsuits were dismissed based on findings that submitting articles to USPTO and making limited copies of them for those purposes was a fair use.
