= Copyright for Creativity =

Copyright for Creativity – A Declaration for Europe issued on 5 May 2010, is intended as a statement of how copyright policy could be constructed in the Internet Age. It comes against the background of political debate within Europe to rethink copyright in an era where the use of digital content without paying fees to the creators is part of the business model for some of the largest global internet platforms. Interests of content creators and online platform providers collide. The declaration has been written by a group from political party "European People's Party (EPP)" The Declaration focuses on both the exclusive rights and the limitations and exceptions to existing copyright rulings and standards.

The Declaration is influenced by the Adelphi Charter, which resulted from a project commissioned by the Royal Society for Arts, Manufactures and Commerce, London, UK.

== Copyright for Creativity Coalition ==
The ad-hoc coalition Copyright for Creativity (C4C), based in Brussels (Dilbeek), Belgium, is registered in the official EU Transparency Register in the section In-house lobbyists. The website "copyright4creativity.eu" refers to a Brussels (Dilbeek) based public affairs and governmental relations firm, and to EU lobbyist Caroline de Cock, owner of this firm, as coordinator. This firm did organise and communicate the EU Hackathon series for Google and mentions the firm as its client, among other clients from industry and trade associations.

== The Declaration ==
The Declaration reads:

Copyright for Creativity – A Declaration for Europe

"Humanity's capacity to generate new ideas and knowledge is its greatest asset. It is the source of art, science, innovation and economic development." Adelphi Charter

The development of new technologies underpinning the knowledge economy calls for a review of the copyright aquis. Together, we need to create greater incentives to maximise creativity, innovation, education and access to culture, and secure Europe's competitiveness.

Exclusive rights stimulate investment and the production of cultural and knowledge based goods. Simultaneously, exceptions* to those rights create a balanced system that allow for the use of creative works to support innovation, creation, competition and the public interest. Well-crafted exceptions can serve both goals: preserving rewards and incentives for creators while also encouraging innovative re-uses that benefit the public.

While exclusive rights have been adapted and harmonised to meet the challenges of the knowledge economy, copyright's exceptions are radically out of line with the needs of the modern information society. The lack of harmonisation of exceptions hinders the circulation of knowledge based goods and services across Europe. The lack of flexibility within the current European exceptions regime also prevents us from adapting to a constantly changing technological environment.

Europe requires a balanced, flexible and harmonised system of exceptions that is in step with the 21st Century knowledge economy. The European Commission took a first step with the publication of the Green Paper, "Copyright in the Knowledge Economy." The signatories of this declaration call upon the European Commission, the European Parliament and Member States to take this Declaration into account and engage in policy and norm-setting on copyright exceptions to:

- Harmonise Exceptions Across Europe. Copyright regulates the flow of consumer as well as knowledge goods in the single market. For European citizens and industry alike, the harmonisation of exceptions is a necessary step to facilitate cross-border trade, and create equality and clarity before the law.
- Act as a Spur to Innovation: New technologies make it possible to expand users' access to vast quantities of relevant knowledge and content. Copyright exceptions must support the development and usage of these innovative services, improving European users' access to content.
- Support User Creativity and Wider Participation: The Internet has facilitated an unprecedented shift for citizens, from being passive consumers of "broadcast" culture to active creators and participants. Individual users are increasingly involved in content and knowledge creation. The European copyright framework needs to reflect this new interactivity which encourages creativity, cultural diversity and self-expression.
- Ensure Accessibility by all Europeans: Exceptions must balance the protection of the creators' rights with the public interest and must fully support improving access to knowledge and content for people with disabilities – most notably through the use of new technologies.
- Support for Education and Research: Information and communication technologies offer new collaborative ways to develop and share educational and research materials. Copyright exceptions that facilitate new technology-based research and education will propel science and learning, and therefore the knowledge economy, exponentially forward.
- Facilitate Preservation and Archiving: Digitisation of content is offering new opportunities not only to preserve but also extend the accessibility of Europe's knowledge and cultural heritage with wide-reaching and long-term benefits for society as a whole. The copyright framework must support this.
- Ensure Monopoly Rights are Regulated in the Online Environment: Limitations and exceptions act to counterbalance the lack of competition that is created by the granting of monopoly rights in copyright law. In order to protect creativity and innovation we must ensure that these monopoly rights are also regulated in the online environment.
- Promote these Principles in International Discussions. The principles and objectives we endorse should not apply only to Europeans – they should be at the centre of the EU's contributions in any discussions in multilateral and bilateral fora it participates in.

* Copyright law enable an exclusive right to creators to regulate and control the use of their work as they wish. Limitations and exceptions balance the monopoly right of the creator, in the public interest. For example to promote education and learning, support a free press, deal with market failure etc.

== See also ==
- Adelphi Charter
- Copyright
- Creativity
- Fair dealing
- Fair use
- Limitations and exceptions to copyright
- Public domain
- World Intellectual Property Organization
