= Copynorms =

As used by copyright theorists, the term copynorm (or more frequently copynorms) is used to refer to a normalized social standard regarding the ethical issue of duplicating copyrighted material.

Questions about the ethics of copying came to public attention as a result of peer-to-peer file sharing systems, such as Napster, Gnutella, KaZaA, BitTorrent and Direct Connect. Survey research indicates that most users of filesharing systems do not believe that it is wrong to download MP3 files of copyrighted music, even though such downloading may be unlawful.

These questions are important to legal theory, because the ability of copyright law to control the copying of digital material may depend more on voluntary compliance than on hypothetical criminal or civil actions against individuals.

== Legal background ==
Copyright law is actually a collection of legal rules. Typically, copyright statutes confer a bundle of legal rights on the author or proprietor of a work (writing, a musical composition or an image), including the exclusive right to make copies of the work, subject to the fair use. Legal rules carry legal consequences. Violation of copyrights can give rise to civil and criminal liability.

In the United States, the Constitution grants Congress power to secure exclusive rights of authors to their writings, and Congress has exercised that power in a comprehensive statutory scheme, codified in Title 17 of the United States Code.

Each nation has its own copyright laws and international treaties set minimum standards for copyright legislation. This entry focuses on the laws of the United States as an example.

== Social rules ==
Copynorms are informal social rules. Social norms include rules of etiquette as well as moral norms (such as the moral prohibitions on theft or murder) and quasi-moral norms (such as the social rules that create zones of privacy in public places). Copynorms are simply the informal social norms that determine the social acceptability of copying works created by others. Social norms are enforced by informal social sanctions, ranging from simple expressions of disapproval (mild) to shunning or vandalism (severe).

Copyright law and copynorms are interrelated but distinct. Some copying that is not prohibited by copyright law violates copynorms—plagiarism of work in the public domain would be an example. More significant to copyright theory and policy, copying that is prohibited by law may be considered socially acceptable.

== Real life examples ==
=== P2P impact ===
In the late 1990s and early in the 2000s, peer-to-peer filesharing over the Internet became increasingly popular. The first P2P program to receive widespread attention in the media and popular consciousness was Napster. Napster was shut down by an injunction issued by the United States District Court for the Northern District of California, which resulted in a variety of other P2P programs (Gnutella, Bearshare, Kazaa, etc.) gaining popularity. Another significant use of P2P programs is the distribution of MP3 files created by ripping copyrighted music from commercial CDs. The use of P2P to distribute digital copies of DVD has also grown in popularity.

There is considerable controversy over the application of the copyright laws to individual, noncommercial use of P2P programs to distribute MP3 files, but judicial opinion, so far, has sided with the music industry and held that an individual who copies and distributes an MP3 file containing copyrighted music violates federal copyright law. Nonetheless, the use of P2P to share and download copyrighted music is generally considered socially acceptable. Survey research supports this conclusion, as does the popularity of P2P programs.

=== Other cases ===
Although P2P has been the focal point in discussions of copynorms, the phenomenon is more general in scope. Some other contexts in which copynorms diverge from United States copyright law include the following:

- Videotape recording of copyrighted broadcast and cable television content for archival (as opposed to time shifting) use,
- Systematic photocopying of books and journal articles for academic and business use,
- Audiotape recording of live music concerts,
- The use of copyrighted digital images (PNG, JPEG, etc.) on personal websites.

To varying degrees, in each of these cases, copying that violates the law is socially acceptable. Anecdotal evidence suggests that illegal archiving of television programs is widely regarded as socially acceptable, and it is doubtful that many users of home Video Cassette Recorders (VCRs) are aware that this activity is unlawful in some countries.

== Causes of divergence ==
In the absence of social science research, theorizing about the causes of the divergence between copyright laws and copynorms is necessarily speculative. Several tentative hypotheses have been suggested. A simple rational choice model might suggest that illegal copying is accepted simply because it is in the self-interest of individuals who can obtain copyrighted materials for free with very little risk of getting caught.

Another possible factor is connected to technological change. Copying technology was relatively centralized and expensive until after the middle of the twentieth century. Until the advent of inexpensive audio tape recorders, the sharing of copyrighted recordings was very difficult and expensive. The transition from reel-to-reel to 8-track cartridge and later cassette tape recorders reduced costs substantially, but a significant investment of time was required to make each copy. Digital technology, the Internet, and specialized P2P software in turn substantially reduced the costs of file sharing. Social norms develop over time and necessarily emerge only with respect to conduct that is sufficiently feasible to become a social issue.

A third factor springs from the fact that most laypeople do not know the precise scope of the monopoly that a copyright grants to the author (or copyright holder). Especially the distinction between legally recording a broadcast from radio / TV on one hand and illegally downloading the very same content on the other hand is difficult to place.

Next, anti-piracy campaigns could have backfired to some degree. Being called a pirate is not too bad, if you enjoyed the movies. And thieves are only evil, if they get caught - but since so many copyright-infringers get away scot-free, they righteously feel as master-thieves or Robin Hood.

A final factor concerns the perceived legitimacy or justice of copyright laws. Many individuals may believe that copyright laws are unjust:

- Most of your everyday expressions in writing or quick snapshots are worthless. Getting asked for it in itself is already an honor that lets people happily share their work. E.g. children grow up providing all family members with their paintings for free.
- Even if the average person knows some mediocre artists, they usually cannot make a living out of their copyrights. Only live-performances are rewarded with applause, a free meal or a compensation for expenses.
- The audience of copyrighted works outnumbers the authors by thousands or more, but copyright laws only protect very few monopolies.
- Many leaks and scandals prove how easily normal users are ripped off their personal data - Quid pro quo some might take other data back in exchange.
- Having bought an obsolete medium like a video cassette with a favorite movie, owners might feel entitled to get a free format conversion upgrade. Also being trapped in a vendor lock-in people might not find a legal way to port the content they thought they owned over to their preferred player, so they resort to dubious sources.
- Prices of blank media are only a tiny fraction of CD/DVD/Blu-ray with content.
- Incredible wealth of millionaires or even billionaires who live of the scarce pocket money of little children - insane revenues that are completely decoupled from the amount of work that went into the creation.
- Many users of P2P programs believe that large music companies rather than artists are the beneficiaries of the economic rents created by copyright laws.

All this increases the perception of injustice and at the same time lowers the moral sympathy of actually hurting someone you know. The most fervent advocates will engage in public civil disobedience of those parts of copyright law that they believe unjust, in hope of getting an eventual jury nullification or otherwise bringing the issues to public attention.

Although the empirical research on copynorms is limited, important survey research has been done by the Pew Center on Internet and Society.

== Implications ==
Implications of weak copynorms for copyright theory and policy are a large and complex question. The content of copyright law may affect the emergence of copynorms. For example, if copyright law is perceived as fair and legitimate, this may strengthen copynorms. Weak copynorms may prevent copyright law from achieving its policy goals. For example, the music industry has argued that P2P has reduced sales, and hence investments in the industry's production of new music recordings.

Proposals for more vigorous enforcement of copyright laws against individual users may affect copynorms, although both the direction and magnitude are uncertain. On one hand, more enforcement might strengthen copynorms by expressing social disapproval of illegal copying. On the other hand, strict enforcement might cause a backlash, further weakening social support for the copyright laws.

== See also ==
- Abandonware
- Copyleft
- Norm (sociology)
- Open Music Model
- Orphaned works
- Peer-to-peer
- Warez

== Bibliography ==
- Eric Posner, Law and Social Norms (Cambridge, Massachusetts: Harvard University Press 2000).
- Mark F. Schultz, "Fear and Norms and Rock & Roll: What Jambands Can Teach Us about Persuading People to Obey Copyright Law" (September 2005). SSRN 864624
- Mark F. Schultz, "Copynorms: Copyright and Social Norms" (September 2006). SSRN 933656
