= Image reproduction rights =

Image reproduction rights are licensing rights for images of artwork owned or otherwise exhibited by galleries, libraries, archives, and museums (GLAMs) regardless of their copyright status. Publishers routinely request authors to obtain permissions from museums in order for the images to be used as illustrations.

This practice is traditional (prior to the invention of photography, artists were charged for the right to copy the exhibited works) and at the end of the 20th century typically involved a one-time fee of few hundred US dollars per publication (like printing postcards or manufacturing tee shirts). At the same time, the inherent issues created by the new digitization technologies were recognized, and the new models of access to collections had emerged.

One of the reasons for control of reproductions is the desire of the museums to protect the integrity of the art objects entrusted to them. For a long time, the main concern museums was with the poor quality images misrepresenting the works. However, proliferation of digital technologies enabled image manipulation and "disrespectful" use. Some museums would not issue, for example, permissions to use the images to promote alcohol, their curators might abhor the notion of changing the color of Monet paintings to match the furniture, and do not want Matisse to be displayed to the accompaniment of hip-hop music. As another consideration, if the cheapening of high art is inevitable, the control assures that the museum is the first in line to collect the money.

== Policies ==
The policies of individual museums regarding the reproduction rights greatly vary ("ask two museums and get three policies"):

- some museums, like the Metropolitan Museum of Arts or Rijksmuseum, provide open access to the out-of-copyright items of their collections (frequently under Creative Commons CC0 license, sometimes encouraging attribution);
- other museums, like the British Museum, require fee for the commercial use of images (for example, through the Creative Commons NonCommercial license). Broadly defined, practically any publication is commercial and a license fee might be required;
- yet other museums require a license for any reproduction.

The basis used by museums to claim reproduction rights varies, too:

- some museums prohibit visitors from taking pictures of their collections unless licensed to do so;
- others require, as a condition to taking pictures, to sign an agreement mandating licensing if the images are to be used for the publications in the future;
- sometimes a museum simply claims copyright to the images taken or even to the items in the collection.

When the museum opts for charging fee for publishing images of exhibited artwork, it frequently manages its reproduction rights by engaging a specialized photo agency, like Art Resource, Scala Archives, Corbis Corporation, Getty Images, or Réunion des Musées Nationaux.

== Legal frameworks ==
Attempts to claim copyright to copies of two-dimensional works of art in public domain are generally rejected by courts when museums try to assert them (for the US law, cf. Bridgeman Art Library v. Corel Corp.). Legal scholars use terms like "copyfraud", "privatization of the public domain", "de facto perpetual monopoly", "copyright overreaching" to characterize the practice. Some scholars argue, however, that integrity of the public domain work is at issue, and thus copyright protection for a high-quality image might be a better solution, "If they want to have a Vermeer on their toilet paper, I’d rather have a very high quality image of Vermeer on toilet paper than a very bad reproduction".

The laws of some countries provide para-copyright legal frameworks for the museums looking to charge a fee for the use of images ("valorisation of cultural goods"). For example, in Italy, in addition to laws allowing restrictions on taking photographs in the museums, the "Ronchey Law" (1993, subsequently changed by multiple successive acts, the particular provision ending up as articles 106–108 of Italian Code on Cultural Goods and Landscape) explicitly allows the state to charge for the reproduction of cultural goods, even when an underlying work of art is in public domain.
