= Reproduction fees =

Cost to reproduce an image in a publication

Reproduction fees are charged by image collections for the right to reproduce images. It is not the same as a copyright fee, but is charged separately, as is the cost of the provision of the image. It can be charged where an image is out of copyright, and reflects the possession of the image by a collection.

Image collection charges vary according to the media (books, magazines, TV, Internet etc.) and print run. Some charge a lower fee for not-for-profit publications. Some institutions employ specialist firms to administer their copyrights and reproduction fees.

== See also ==
- Bridgeman Art Library Ltd. v. Corel Corporation – Legal decision establishing that exact photographic copies of public domain works of art are not copyrightable under United States law.
- Public domain
