= Soleau envelope =

Proof of intellectual property in France

A Soleau envelope (French: enveloppe Soleau; named after its French originator, Eugène Soleau, 1853–1929), is a sealed envelope which in France serves as legally recognized proof of priority of invention and validity of certain intellectual property claims. It is exclusively used to precisely ascertain the date of an invention, idea, or creation of a work. An envelope (sealed) containing a record of the invention can be deposited at and officially dated by the French National Institute of Industrial Property (INPI).

The envelope has two compartments which must each contain the identical version of the element for which registration is sought. The INPI laser-marks some parts of the envelope for the sake of delivery date authentication and sends one of the compartments back to the original depositary who submitted the envelope. The thus dated and sealed envelope may then be used in a legal or administrative proceeding to help prove that, as at a date-certain, the invention or the subject matter in the envelope had been created. (Thus, the envelopes should remain sealed and their contents the same: if an envelope was open, additional materials might have been added to it after the date inscribed upon it, and thus mere presence in the envelope would not constitute the same good proof of invention by the date on its exterior.) The soleau envelope may be thought of as a legal placeholder — a marker of the true state of affairs as at a particular date in the past.

The originator must keep their part of the envelope sealed except in case of litigation. The deposit can be made at the INPI, by airmail, or at one of the INPI's regional subsidiaries. The envelope is kept for a period of five years; this term can be renewed once.

The working principles governing this legal mechanism were defined in a ruling of the INPI of 9 May 1986, subsequently published in the French official gazette dated 6 June 1986 (Journal officiel de la République française or JORF), although the institution of the Soleau envelope dates back to 1915.

The envelope may not contain any hard element such as cardboard, rubber, computer disks, leather, staples, or pins. Each compartment can only contain up to seven A4-size paper sheets, with a maximum of 5 millimetres (0.2 in) thickness. If the envelope is deemed inadmissible, it is sent back to the depositary at their own expense.

Unlike a patent or utility model, the depositor has no exclusivity right over the claimed element (invention). The Soleau envelope, as compared to a stronger and later patent, only allows use of the technique, rather than ownership. Thus, multiple people might submit envelopes to support separate similar such uses before and until a formal full patent is granted, later in the process. This patent, unlike the envelopes, allows the patent holder to stop, inhibit or otherwise restrict others from such application of her (now patented) idea or technique.

== See also ==
- Poor man's copyright
