= Copyright registration =

Legal process recording publication of a work

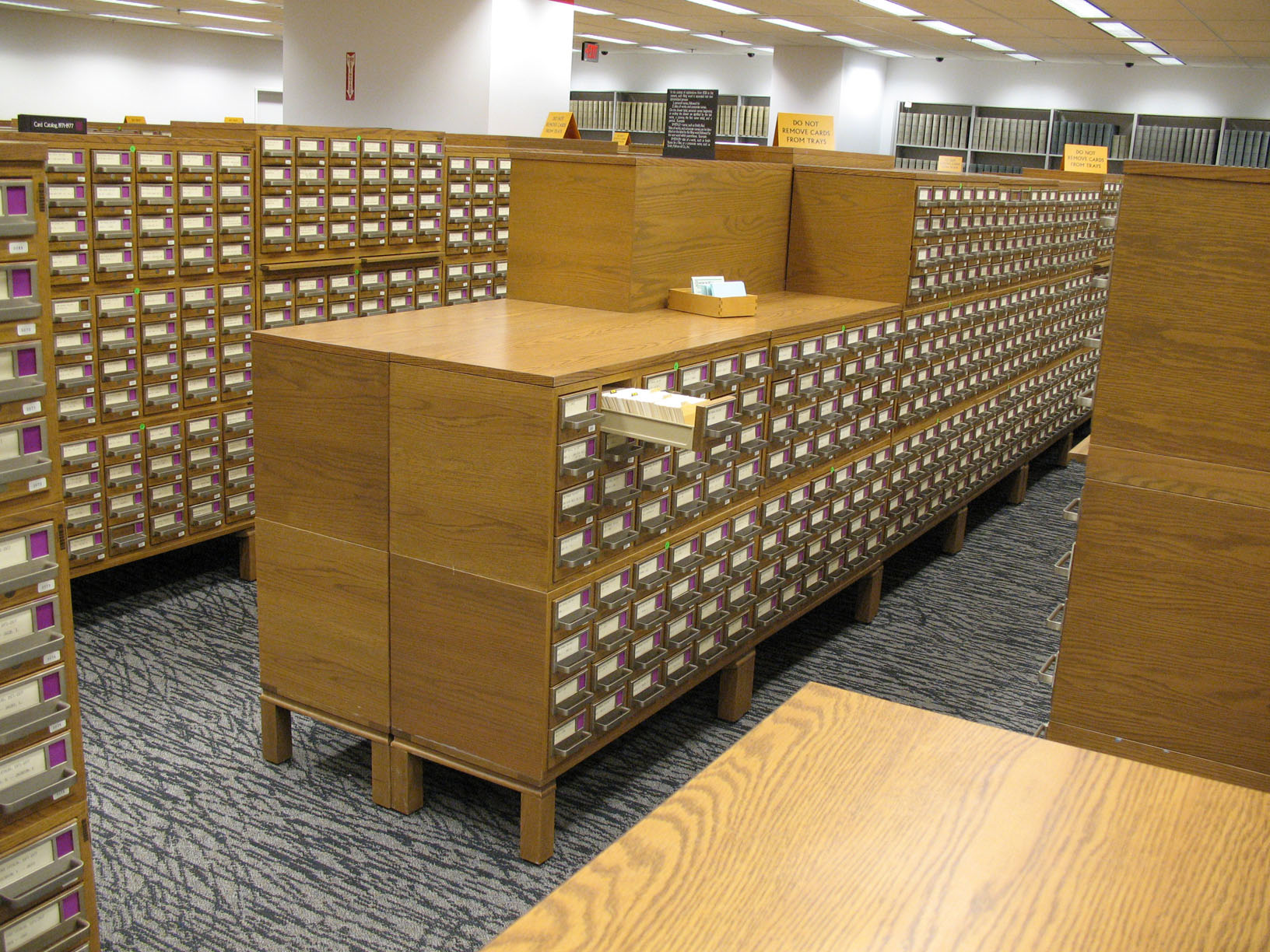
The pre-1978 indices to the copyright records are available for public inspection at the Library of Congress.

The purpose of copyright registration is to place on record a verifiable account of the date and content of the work in question, so that in the event of a legal claim, or case of infringement or plagiarism, the copyright owner can produce a copy of the work from an official government source.

Before 1978, in the United States, federal copyright was generally secured by the act of publication with notice of copyright or by registration of an unpublished work. This has now been largely superseded by international conventions, principally the Berne Convention, which provide rights harmonized at an international level without a requirement for national registration. However, the U.S. still provides legal advantages for registering works of U.S. origin. For example, a registration, or a refusal of registration, is required before an infringement suit may be filed in a US court and registration is required for claiming statutory damages in most cases.

== Requirement of registration ==
It is a common misconception to confuse copyright registration with the granting of copyright. Copyright in most countries today is automatic on "fixation" – it applies as soon as the work is fixed in some tangible medium. This standard is established internationally by the Berne Convention (1886), which most countries have signed onto since. Registration may be required by countries before joining Berne. For instance, the US required registration of copyrighted works before it signed onto the Berne Convention in 1989; at that point, registration was no longer required for works to be copyrighted in the US.

The observation that registration is not required in the United States, however, has been described as misleading. This is partly because registration remains a prerequisite to filing an infringement suit, and also because important remedies depend on prompt registration—such as attorneys fees and statutory damages. At least one commentator has questioned whether the conditioning of legal recourse on registration is inconsistent with the United States' obligations under the Berne Convention regarding "formalities".

== Scholarship on reinstating registration requirements ==
Some scholars and policy advocates (such as law professor and activist Lawrence Lessig and U.S. Representative Zoe Lofgren) have called for returning to a system of registration requirements and possibly other formalities such as copyright notice. The system of automatic copyright on fixation has been cited as one of the factors behind the growth of so-called "orphan works" in, for instance, the U.S. Copyright Office's 2006 report on orphan works. UC Berkeley's Law School held a conference in 2013 on the question of "Reform(aliz)ing Copyright for the Internet Age?", noting that

"Formalities, which in the past three decades have largely disappeared from American copyright law, may be about to stage a comeback. ... [R]ecent research on formalities suggests that we can get many of the benefits that formalities promise for a more efficient and focused copyright law, without the problems that led us to do away with them in the first place."

== Registering agencies ==
- In Canada, copyrighted works can be registered at the Canadian Intellectual Property Office for a fee.
- In Kenya, copyrighted works can be registered at the Kenya Copyrights Board for a small fee.
- In the United Kingdom, there is no official registration regime for copyrights, however the Writers' Guild of Great Britain recommends The Script Vault to members who wish to register their copyright and the Guild's website provides a link on their FAQ page. Commercial services provide a registration facility where copies of work can be lodged to establish legal evidence of a copyright claim. There are also requirements to file certain published works with the British Library and, on request, the five legal deposit libraries.
- In the United States, the United States Copyright Office accepts registrations. For works created in the US by US citizens, a registration is also required before an infringement suit may be filed in a US court. Furthermore, copyright holders cannot claim statutory damages or attorney's fees unless the work was registered prior to infringement, or within three months of publication.

== Finding copyright registrations ==
All United States copyright registrations and renewals registered since 1978 have been published online at the Copyright Office website. Registrations and renewals prior to 1978 were published in semi-annual softcover Copyright Catalogs. For films from 1894 to 1969, inclusive, Library of Congress published hardcover Cumulative Copyright Catalogs, each covering ten or more years.

Please see the Copyright Catalog article for links to download digital copies of these pre-1978 US catalogs.

== Requirements by country ==
Copyright registration by country
Country	Registration agency (if any)	Copyright registration requirements
Albania	Albanian Author's Right Office	Voluntary. Registration is acceptable in court as evidence of author's right.
Antigua and Barbuda	None	Not required. No voluntary procedure available.
Argentina	Ministry of Justice, Security, and Human Rights	Voluntary. Registration serves as presumption of authorship and date of creation.
Australia	None	Not required. No voluntary procedure available.
Belarus	National Center of Intellectual Property	Voluntary. May establish evidence of date of creation and a presumption of ownership.
Brazil	Various, depending on subject matter	Voluntary. Registration may help to provide evidence of authorship and which may aid in certifying precedence in the case of two similar works.
Canada	Canadian Intellectual Property Office	Voluntary. Registration is evidence of ownership in an infringement case.
China	National Copyright Administration	Voluntary. Recommended, especially for software.
Denmark	None	Not required. No voluntary procedure available.
Egypt	None	Not required. No voluntary procedure available.
Finland	None	Not required. No voluntary procedure available.
France	Institut National de la Propriété Intellectuelle	Voluntary, may establish evidence of date of creation and a presumption of ownership.
Germany	None	Not required. No voluntary procedure available.
India	Copyright Office	Voluntary, establishes prima facie evidence of the facts contained on the registration certificate and may be used in court as proof of those facts.
Israel	None	Not required. No voluntary procedure available.
Italy	None	Not required. No voluntary procedure available.
Jamaica	None - The Intellectual Property Services Centre is a non-profit organization that provides private registration services and is recommended by the Jamaican Intellectual Property Office for that purpose	Not officially available, though voluntary registration through the Intellectual Property Services Centre provides rebuttable evidence of authorship and/or ownership. The Jamaican Intellectual Property Office officially recommends the practice of "poor man's copyright" to provide evidence of ownership and creation date.
Japan	Agency for Cultural Affairs	Voluntary, establishes presumption of facts contained in registration for use in court.
Kenya	Kenya Copyright Board	Voluntary, establishes prima facie evidence of the facts contained on the registration certificate and may be used in court as proof of those facts
Lithuania	None	Not required. No voluntary procedure available.
Malaysia	Intellectual Property Corporation of Malaysia (MyIPO)	Voluntary Notifications is to assist in providing prima facie evidence of ownership and evidence of date of creation. This may aid the copyright owner since the voluntary notification can be used in court as proof of the facts made.
Mexico	Instituto Nacional del Derecho de Autor	Voluntary, establishes prima facie evidence of ownership.
New Zealand	None	Not required. No voluntary procedure available.
Portugal	Inspeção Geral das Atividades Culturais	Voluntary, offers refutable presumption of copyright and ownership.
Russian Federation	Rospatent	Voluntary registration available for computer programs and databases.
South Africa	Companies and Intellectual Property Commission (CIPC)	Voluntary registration available for cinematograph films. Establishes prima facie evidence of the facts contained on the registration certificate and may be used in court as proof of those facts.
Spain	Ministry of Culture	Voluntary, offers refutable presumption of copyright and ownership, but not required to file suit for infringement.
Sweden	None	Not required. No voluntary procedure available.
Turkey	Ministry of Culture	Required for cinematographic works and phonograms, voluntary for all other works. Registration may be used as evidence.
Ukraine	National Office of Intellectual Property	Voluntary.
United Kingdom	None	Not required. No voluntary procedure available. From 1842 to 1883, many products carried a Registration lozenge.
United States	United States Copyright Office	Not required to obtain copyright protection, but required for domestic copyright owners to bring a suit for copyright infringement in federal court. Not required for a federal court's subject-matter jurisdiction, however, as established through the Supreme Court decision in Reed Elsevier, Inc. v. Muchnick. Registration establishes prima facie evidence of facts contained in registration certificate if made within five years of first publication. Copyright owners are precluded from collecting statutory damages and/or attorney's fees for any infringement occurring before registration. Foreign copyright owners are not required to register before suing for copyright infringement, but at least one court has held that they are subject to the same preclusion of statutory damages as domestic authors.

== See also ==
- Copyright formalities
- Public domain
- Copyright renewal
