= Paracopyright =

Legal protection above traditional copyright

Paracopyright ("pseudocopyright" or "metacopyright") is legal protection above and beyond traditional copyright. The most often cited example is "legal protection for technical measures" from the 1996 WIPO Internet treaties. Paracopyright provisions in these treaties are not about the term or scope of copyright, but instead are about providing legal protections for the technologies that may be used by copyright holders.

Paracopyrights afford legal protection to technologies that claim to be used to protect copyrights, but that are ineffective in that goal. A technical measure can not stop a technically sophisticated person who wishes to infringe copyright. To use the "digital locks" analogy, there is no need to "pick the lock" as the keys necessary to decode the content are embedded within authorized access technology. Both the locked content and the technology containing the key are commercially available to an infringer. Once a single person decodes a technical measure, the decoded content can be made available to others in the same way as if the technical measure never existed.

The effect of these technical measures are to impose specific contractual license agreements on those conforming to copyright law. As a concept, therefore, paracopyrights are perhaps better understood as a part of contract law and not copyright law. Unfortunately, important regulations regarding consumer protection and the "freedom to contract" are not imported directly into paracopyright laws, potentially creating imbalances in the law and harmful unintended consequences.

Copyright is traditionally understood as a statutorily defined bundle of exclusive rights provided to copyright holders. An infringement of copyright takes place when someone exercises one or more of the copyright holder's exclusive rights without his or her permission. Anti-circumvention and anti-device provisions do not fit under this paradigm of a bundle of exclusive rights. On one hand, a copyright owner has the exclusive right to copy his or her work, and that exclusive right is infringed when someone else copies the work without permission. It is quite another story, however, to think about copyright holders having the exclusive right to circumvent TPMs (Technical Protection Measure) that they apply to their works, and the exclusive right to make and distribute devices that enable or facilitate circumvention of TPMs. Even assuming that this problem could be overcome, attempting to force anti-circumvention and anti-device provisions to fit the mold of the bundle of rights paradigm seems to necessitate adding a number of related rights to the bundle, including the exclusive right to apply a TPM to a copyright work.

== See also ==
- Digital Millennium Copyright Act
- Digital rights management
