= Adelphi Charter =

2004 statement regarding intellectual property policy

The Adelphi Charter on Creativity, Innovation and Intellectual Property is the result of a project commissioned by the Royal Society for the encouragement of Arts, Manufactures & Commerce, London, England, and is intended as a positive statement of what good intellectual property policy is. The Charter was issued in 2004.

The Charter has subsequently influenced thinking on Intellectual Property Law, and in particular, heavily influenced a subsequent copyright manifesto Copyright for Creativity – A Declaration for Europe.

== Adelphi Charter on Creativity, Innovation and Intellectual Property ==
The Adelphi Charter reads:

Humanity's capacity to generate new ideas and knowledge is a key driver of art, science, innovation, and economic development.

This creative imagination requires access to the ideas, learning and culture of others, past and present. And, in the future, others will use what we have done. Human rights call on us to ensure that everyone can create, access, use and share information and knowledge, enabling individuals, communities and societies to achieve their full potential.

Creativity and investment should be recognised and rewarded. The purpose of intellectual property law (such as copyright and patents) should be, now as it was in the past, to ensure both the sharing of knowledge and the rewarding of innovation.

The expansion in the law's breadth, scope and term over the last 30 years has resulted in an intellectual property regime which is radically out of line with modern technological, economic and social trends. This disconnect threatens the chain of creativity and innovation on which we and future generations depend.

We therefore call upon governments and the international community to adopt these principles:

1. Laws regulating intellectual property must serve as means of achieving creative, social and economic ends and must not be seen as ends in themselves.
2. These laws and regulations must serve, and never overturn, the basic human rights to health, education, employment and cultural life.
3. The public interest requires a balance between the public domain and private rights. It also requires a balance between the free competition which is essential for economic vitality and the monopoly rights granted by intellectual property laws.
4. Intellectual property protection must not be extended to abstract ideas, facts or data.
5. Patents must not be extended over mathematical models, scientific theories, computer code, methods for teaching, business processes, methods of medical diagnosis, therapy or surgery.
6. Copyright and patents must be limited in time and their terms must not extend beyond what is proportionate and necessary.
7. Government must facilitate a wide range of policies to stimulate access and innovation, including non-proprietary models such as open source software licensing and open access to scientific literature.
8. Intellectual property laws must take account of developing countries' social and economic circumstances.
9. In making decisions about intellectual property law, governments should adhere to these rules:
  - There must be an automatic presumption against creating new areas of intellectual property protection, extending existing privileges or extending the duration of rights.
  - The burden of proof in such cases must lie on the advocates of change.
  - Change must be allowed only if a rigorous analysis clearly demonstrates that it will promote people's basic rights and economic well-being.
  - Throughout, there should be wide public consultation and a comprehensive, objective and transparent assessment of public detriments and benefits.

RSA, Adelphi, London, 13 October 2005

== Authors of the Charter ==
The Charter was prepared by an International Commission of experts from the arts, creative industries, human rights, law, economics, science, R&D, technology, the public sector and education.

Commission members at the time of publishing included;

- Professor James Boyle – William Neal Reynolds Professor of Law, Duke Law School, and Faculty Co-Director, Center for the Study of the Public Domain, Duke University
- Lynne Brindley – Chief Executive, British Library
- Professor William Cornish – Former Herchel Smith Professor of Intellectual Property University of Cambridge
- Carlos Correa – Centre for Interdisciplinary Studies on Industrial Property and Economics University of Buenos Aires;and South Centre Switzerland
- Darius Cuplinskas – Director, Information Programme Open Society Institute
- Carolyn Deere – Chair, Board of Directors, Intellectual Property Watch; and Research Associate, Global Economic Governance Programme, University of Oxford and University College, Oxford.
- Cory Doctorow – Staff Member, Electronic Frontier Foundation; and writer
- Peter Drahos – Professor of Law, Director of the Centre for Competition and Regulatory Policy, and Head, RegNet, The Australian National University
- Bronac Ferran – Director, Interdisciplinary Arts Arts Council England
- Dr Michael Jubb – Director, UK Research Libraries Network
- Gilberto Gil – Minister of Culture, Brazil; and musician
- Professor Lawrence Lessig – Chair, Creative Commons; Professor of Law and John A. Wilson Distinguished Faculty Scholar Stanford Law School
- James Love – Executive Director, Consumer Project on Technology; and Co-Chair, Transatlantic Consumer Dialogue (TACD) Committee on Intellectual Property
- Hector MacQueen – Professor of Private Law and Director, AHRB Research Centre on Intellectual Property and Technology Law University of Edinburgh
- Professor John Naughton – Professor of the Public Understanding of Technology, Open University; Fellow of Wolfson College, Cambridge University; and columnist, 'The Observer'
- Vandana Shiva – physicist, philosopher, environmental activist and writer.
- Sir John Sulston – Nobel Laureate; former director, Wellcome Trust, Sanger Institute
- Louise Sylvan – Deputy Chair, Australian Competition & Consumer Commission

The Director was John Howkins , and the Research Coordinator Dr Jaime Stapleton .
