= Censorship by proxy =

Form of indirect censorship

Censorship by proxy is the effort to suppress information by means other than criminalizing it or destroying it. It is a form of indirect censorship in which governments pressure private intermediaries, such as Internet service providers, social media platforms, payment processors, broadcasters, publishers, or web hosting services, to restrict or deny access to content. The mechanism allows state actors to achieve censorship objectives while circumventing legal protections that would apply to direct government censorship.

== Definition ==
A 2006 paper by law professor Seth F. Kreimer, "Censorship by Proxy," noted, "Rather than attacking speakers or listeners directly, governments have sought to enlist private actors within [a complex chain of digital connections] as proxy censors to control the flow of information."

Censorship by proxy may entail legal pressure, whereby governments enact laws that create liabilities for hosting or broadcasting certain content. Government pressure may be more informal, with state actors making public statements or communicating privately to intermediaries that they should remove content while implying consequences if they do not, or demanding the identities of the authors of the content. Governments sometimes threaten boycotts, regulatory action, or loss of government contracts unless intermediaries restrict content. They may also seek to make it difficult for disfavored entities to conduct business. These practices are sometimes called "jawboning."

== United States case law ==
In United States jurisprudence, the primary challenge in cases of censorship by proxy is determining when government communications with private intermediaries cross the line from lawful persuasion into unconstitutional coercion. Legal scholars note that because the government possesses immense regulatory and financial leverage, even subtle or informal prompts can compel private platforms to restrict speech.

The foundational precedent governing this dynamic is the 1963 Supreme Court case Bantam Books, Inc. v. Sullivan, which established that the First Amendment is violated if a state agency uses informal power to coerce a third party into suppressing protected content. This doctrine was revisited in two major 2024 Supreme Court decisions:

- NRA v. Vullo (2024): The case arose from allegations that Maria Vullo, superintendent of the New York State Department of Financial Services, used her regulatory authority to pressure financial institutions to sever their relationships with the National Rifle Association of America. The Supreme Court unanimously held that the NRA had plausibly alleged a First Amendment violation by the former director of the New York State Department of Financial Services when she met with financial institutions about discontinuing their relationships with the NRA. The decision reaffirmed that government officials may not use their regulatory authority to coerce private parties into punishing or suppressing disfavored speech on the government's behalf, including through private intermediaries.
- Murthy v. Missouri (2024): This case directly addressed "jawboning" and proxy censorship involving federal agencies and social media companies. Attorneys general accused agents and aides of the Biden administration of attempting to coerce social media sites into removing material critical of the government and its positions. The Supreme Court ultimately ruled 6–3 that the plaintiffs lacked Article III standing to seek an injunction, holding that they had not sufficiently connected the challenged government communications to likely future moderation of their speech. Legal scholars note that the case highlighted the systemic difficulty in legally proving diffuse, indirect state pressure.

== Examples ==
=== Print era ===
Examples of censorship by proxy appeared in the early modern period, when governments held printers and publishers legally responsible for seditious or heretical content, incentivizing self-censorship without express prior restraint. The English Licensing of the Press Act 1662 operated partially through this mechanism by requiring printers to obtain licenses and holding them accountable for printed materials.

Kreimer characterized McCarthyism as an example of censorship by proxy. "The McCarthy era saw the rise of efforts by state and federal governments in the United States to persuade private parties to control speakers and publishers whom the accepted free speech jurisprudence placed beyond the reach of official prosecution."

=== Digital era ===
In 2003, law professors associated with Tel Aviv University observed that "the State allowed private nodes of control to emerge and develop in the information environment" and was using them to "seize control."

==== United States ====
In the United States, the Federal Bureau of Investigation has deployed a "good corporate citizenship program" in the context of the so-called War on Terror to censor constitutionally protected websites deemed not to be in the public interest.

Episodes of censorship by proxy took place during the COVID-19 pandemic and the 2020 presidential election cycle. In 2021, Elizabeth Warren wrote to Amazon and other booksellers stating that certain books she accused of spreading COVID-19 misinformation had "led to untold... deaths" to which they had contributed by selling them, which she characterized as "potentially unlawful." She accused Amazon specifically of "potentially leading countless Americans to risk their health and the health of their neighbors based on misleading and inaccurate information that they discover on Amazon's website." Legal scholar Christopher Keleher wrote of the senator's statements, "Although axiomatic that the government cannot silence speakers based on their viewpoint, using intermediaries to do so is equally impermissible. Yet defiance of the medical establishment prompted officials and their corporate proxies to collude." These and other examples prompted the House of Representatives to pass the Protecting Speech from Government Interference Act.

In 2022, Reason magazine accused Adam Schiff of censorship by proxy when the representative publicly pressured Elon Musk to curtail the rise in abusive speech on Twitter following his takeover of the site.

In 2023, the New Civil Liberties Alliance sued the Department of State for censorship by proxy of The Daily Wire and The Federalist. The suit alleged that the State Department's Global Engagement Center developed blacklist tools designed to damage advertising revenues to media outlets deemed to spread views unfavorable to the administration, including the New York Post, Reason, RealClearPolitics, and others.

As discussed above, the 2024 Supreme Court cases National Rifle Association of America v. Vullo and Murthy v. Missouri involved claims of government pressure on private intermediaries. Americans for Prosperity Foundation filed amicus briefs in both cases, stating, "Censorship by proxy is still censorship." The Buckeye Institute also filed amicus briefs concerning "Murthy" and "Vullo", stating "Censorship by proxy has a history of bipartisan abuse, with governments using it to silence people and organizations espousing politically unpopular ideas."

First Amendment scholar Evelyn Douek characterized ABC's 2025 decision to cancel Jimmy Kimmel Live! after pressure on The Walt Disney Company from the Federal Communications Commission as an example of jawboning. The Cato Institute agreed, remarking, "Government officials need not act directly to censor speech."

In October 2025, Will Creeley, Legal Director for the Foundation for Individual Rights and Expression, testified to the U.S. Senate Committee on Commerce, Science, and Transportation, saying, "Federal officials must be meaningfully deterred from jawboning, and held accountable when they do." Creeley cited Murthy, Vullo, and the Kimmel cancellation as examples.

=== Elsewhere ===
In China, the government can fine or shut down social media providers for not complying with censorship regulations.

==== European Union ====
In the European Union, censorship by proxy primarily operates through intermediary liability rules rather than direct state mandates. Under the former e-Commerce Directive (Directive 2000/31/EC), online hosting providers were broadly protected from liability for user-generated content as long as they did not have "actual knowledge" of illegal activity and acted quickly to remove or disable access to it once they became aware of it. This exemption from liability was contingent on providers removing content when notified by government authorities, which has engendered concerns about freedom of expression.

== See also ==
- Internet censorship
- Corporate censorship
- Chilling effect
- Collateral censorship
- Content moderation
- Deplatforming
- Internet intermediary
- Network neutrality
- Prior restraint
- Self-censorship
- State action doctrine
