= Censorship by copyright =

Use of copyright to enact censorship

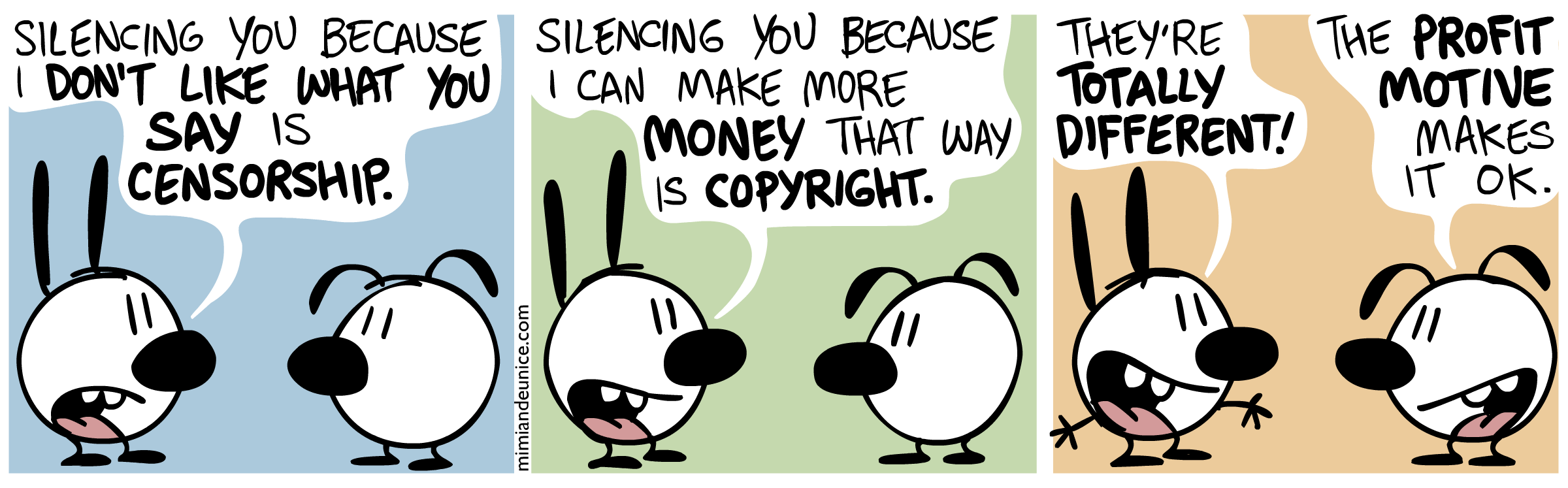
Free culture activists are critical of the censorship by copyright practice, as seen in this Mimi & Eunice by Nina Paley webcomic on "Censorship vs. Copyright", which criticizes the profit motive.

Copyright can be used to enact censorship. Critics of copyright argue that copyright has been abused to suppress free speech, as well as criticism, business competition, academic research, investigative reporting (and freedom of press) and artistic expression.

The most common form of censorship by copyright concerns the abuse of the Digital Millennium Copyright Act (DMCA) either by copyright holders or by the service providers. The DMCA forces web hosts to be overly sensitive to claims of copyright infringement and act as de facto gatekeepers, infringing upon fair use as well as facilitating abuse in the form of bogus copyright claims.

== Reasons ==
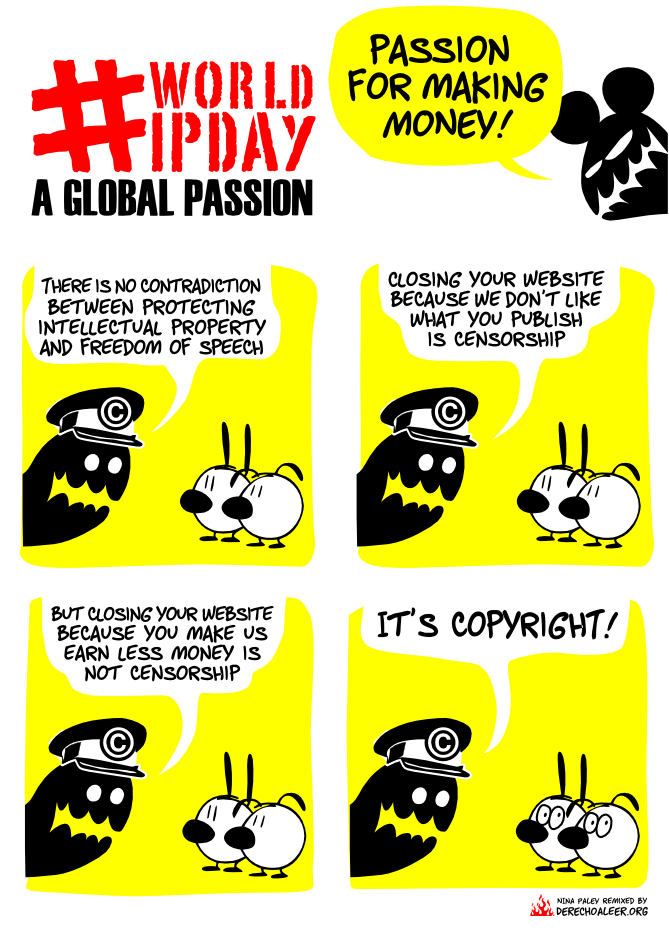
"IP censure", a cartoon discussing concepts of censorship and copyright on the occasion of the World Intellectual Property Day, is another comic critical of the practice related to activism critical of copyright.

=== Strong-arm deterrence tactic ===
The use of censorship of copyright has been described as a legal "strong-arm" tactic (guerrilla litigation) aimed at creating deterrents for future copyright infringement by educating the public about the copyright. This tactic does not require a trial, as the threat of litigation against financially vulnerable violators can often be sufficient. Sometimes such activities are called strategic lawsuits against public participation (SLAPP). This has also led to chilling effect, self-censorship or abuse from copyright trolls.

=== Censorship ===
The lack of consequences for perjury in DMCA claims encourages censorship. This has caused temporary takedowns of legitimate content that can be financially damaging to the legitimate copyright holder, who has no recourse for reimbursement. As a consequence, DMCA has enabled copyright owners to "censor academic discussions and online criticism". It has also been used by businesses to censor competition. It has also been used to censor investigative reporting, and suppress political speech. This includes the use of it by parties in non-democratic states, which use international law to remove content from international (Western) platforms like YouTube. Modern copyright has been described as "an attractive weapon to chill speech".

In the context of American legislation, censorship by copyright has been said to violate the First Amendment; such abuse of copyright is supposed to be limited by fair use, but fair use has been found to be difficult to enforce due to chilling effects of copyright litigation and disparity of power between copyright holders and those seeking permission to use a work. In particular, protections related to satirical use are seen as inadequate.

Censorship by copyright has also been linked to reducing innovation, creativity, and limiting artistic expression. A study involving visual artists and professionals in the visual arts sector revealed that one-third have either avoided or ceased work in their domain due to worries about copyright infringement. Additionally, over half of the editors and publishers surveyed have dropped or reduced the scope of their projects because of these worries. A 2005 survey of documentary makers in Canada found that 85% of them said copyright is more harmful than beneficial for their field and that it threatens their ability to produce content. Such concerns have also hindered museums and libraries from digitizing and sharing cultural and scientific materials, including works for whom no living copyright holder could be identified but which are protected by the law by default (orphan works).

=== Suppression of historical and religious texts ===
Copyright has also been used to restrict access to historical, religious, and esoteric texts, particularly by organizations that claim institutional ownership over works produced by their founders or members. Critics argue that when religious or fraternal organizations use copyright to limit distribution of philosophical, spiritual, or instructional texts — especially those written decades or centuries ago — the effect is censorship of cultural heritage rather than protection of commercial interests.

Notable examples include disputes over the literary estate of Aleister Crowley, where the Ordo Templi Orientis (OTO) has pursued copyright claims against publishers and distributors of Crowley's works, some of which were originally published in the early twentieth century. Similar disputes have arisen around texts from fraternal and initiatory organizations, where materials originally intended for educational use within the organization are restricted from broader scholarly or public access through copyright enforcement.

The tension between institutional copyright control and public access to historical religious texts has been cited as a factor in the growth of shadow libraries that specialize in esoteric and philosophical works, where communities of scholars and practitioners share texts they argue should be part of the public cultural commons.

== Technology and laws that facilitate censorship ==
=== Abuse of law ===
Most common form of censorship by copyright concerns abuse of the Digital Millennium Copyright Act (DMCA). That legislation forces web hosts to be overly sensitive to claims of copyright infringement, infringing upon fair use as well as facilitating abuse in the form of bogus copyright claims.

Other laws that have been criticized for similar problems include the European Union's Directive on Copyright in the Digital Single Market (Copyright Directive), and the EU General Data Protection Regulation (GDPR) and the concept of the right to be forgotten.

=== Automated copyright enforcement ===
The increasing prevalence of online media has led to content hosting companies developing automated solutions for copyright enforcement to help copyright holders remove alleged infringement from their services. Such solutions, however, are overprotective due to difficulties related to defining legal uses such as quotations or fair use, as well as the lack of authoritative information about who is a legitimate rights holder for which copyrighted work. They are also designed from the perspective of assumption of guilt, as any claim made by copyright holders is automatically accepted, results in the takedown of allegedly offending material, and requires the accused to prove their innocence.

Moreover, the risks associated with making a false accusation are low: the person accused must first submit a counterclaim to establish their copyright ownership and then take private legal action to demonstrate actual harm. They must locate the other party in order to enforce any financial compensation awarded by the judiciary.

Consequentially, automated copyright detection systems built for and used by online video hosting services like Google's Content ID have been used by governments, companies and individuals to block critical reporting. In some cases, individuals have been known to play copyrighted music to disrupt streaming, recording or other activities with the intent of getting other users' videos taken down by automated systems.

Tools used in content moderation have been subject to similar criticism.

== History and notable examples ==
Earliest examples of the use of copyright law to enforce censorship relate to the British government invoking the monopoly of the Worshipful Company of Stationers and Newspaper Makers to suppress texts it deemed problematic, such as anti-Cromwellian and anti-Caroline satirical writings in the sixteenth and seventeenth centuries. To circumvent the Stationers' monopoly on print, contemporary activists used a handwriting (scribed) method of publication.

It has been argued that censorship by copyright is becoming increasingly more common in the Digital Age. It has also been called a major element of censorship found in democratic societies, otherwise critical of the concept of censorship. Hannibal Travis wrote that "copyright largely determines the accessibility and cost of information in a democratic society, and that it grants rights holders substantial powers of censorship through the threat of prosecution for infringement". Modern copyright laws and associated technologies developed to enforce it have been described as "wielded by powerful government and business officials as a weapon to censor independent news media and deter investigative reporting". Said laws and technologies have been generally developed in the Global North, and are abused there as well, but are even more commonly abused in the Global South, where traditions and protections of free speech are weaker.

Incidents described as censorship by copyright include:

- 1939: Adolf Hitler's Mein Kampf was published in the United States in an abbreviated English translation that left out anti-semitic and militarist portions that Americans were likely to find alarming. The future Senator Alan Cranston published his own annotated translation in order to expose Hitler's true thought to Americans. Hitler's American publisher, Houghton Mifflin, sued successfully for copyright violation, resulting in the discontinuation of sales of Cranston's version.
- 1998: Canadian documentary The Kid Who Couldn't Miss was withdrawn from distribution in 1998 by the National Film Board of Canada due to concerns that it would not generate enough revenue to pay for the renewal rights for its archival footage, which was required by copyright laws. Kirwan Cox called this ironic as "the public lost access to this film not because of political censorship [the documentary has been criticized by a number of Canadian politicians], but because of copyright censorship."
- 2001: In 2001, American computer scientist Edward Felten was threatened by the Recording Industry Association of America (RIAA), which invoked DMCA, threatening to sue Felten if he went through with his planned academic conference presentation on bypassing digital watermarks protecting media files; Felten withdrew his presentation.
- 2007: A YouTube video from Brian Sapient from the "Rational Response Squad" contained a segment from a NOVA program called "Secrets of the Psychics" which challenged the performance techniques of Uri Geller, an illusionist and self-proclaimed psychic. Geller demanded that YouTube take the video down, even though he claimed to own only three seconds of footage out of the entire thirteen-minute video. YouTube nonetheless removed Sapient's video and suspended his account and all videos associated with it. Electronic Frontier Foundation (EFF) represented Sapient and claimed that Geller's abused the Digital Millennium Copyright Act (DMCA) and eventually negotiated a settlement.
- 2007: New York City activist Savitri Durkee created UnionSquarePartnershipSucks.org, a website parodying the official website of Union Square Partnership (USP), a group backing extensive redevelopment of the Union Square area. In response, USP sent Durkee's Internet service provider a notice pursuant to the Digital Millennium Copyright Act (DMCA) improperly asserting that her parody site infringed USP's copyright, leading to the shutdown of the site. USP also filed a copyright lawsuit against Durkee and later filed a claim with the World Intellectual Property Organization (WIPO) seeking to take control of the parody site's domain name. Electronic Frontier Foundation (EFF) filed a response to USP's complaint on Durkee's behalf, pointing out that Durkee's parody is protected under the First Amendment and fair use doctrine. The website and domain were ultimately restored.
- 2007: The destruction of a recreation of the School of Magic and Wizardry from the J.K. Rowling's Harry Potter franchise during the Durga Puja in Kolkata; the festival organizers were sued by Penguin Books, the publisher of the book series. The Calcutta High Court ordered the structure demolished after the festival.
- 2007: As part of its campaign to raise awareness about the treatment of animals at rodeos, nonprofit group Showing Animals Respect and Kindness (SHARK) posted a series of videos of rodeo events to YouTube. In response, the Professional Rodeo Cowboys Association (PRCA) filed takedown demands for 13 of the videos under the Digital Millennium Copyright Act (DMCA), claiming the videos infringed their copyrights – despite the fact that the PRCA has no copyright claim in live rodeo events. Initially, SHARK's entire YouTube account was disabled, but the account was reinstated after SHARK, supported by the Electronic Frontier Foundation, sued, eventually obtaining a settlement from the PRCA.
- 2008: During the 2008 United States presidential election season, the McCain campaign posted a satirical video that included a clip of CBS News anchor Katie Couric commenting on sexism in the campaign. CBS News issued a DMCA takedown notice and had the video removed from YouTube.
- 2009: In September 2009, "Photoshop Disasters"—a blog covering egregious photo editing missteps—published a photo of a Polo Ralph Lauren ad in which the model's body was grotesquely smaller than her head. Internet culture blog Boing Boing noticed the oddity and reposted the picture, with some additional commentary. The company sent a DMCA threat to Boing Boing's web host as well as Photoshop Disaster's ISP, demanding that the image be removed. Photoshop Disaster's ISP apparently took the image down, but Boing Boing's web host forwarded the threat to Boing Boing staff, who asserted its fair use rights in its response.
- 2010: The newspaper Folha de São Paulo took advantage of the copyright issue so that a parody, with the name FALHA DE SÃO PAULO, created in the context of the 2010 electoral dispute in Brazil, was banned with its domain from the Brazilian internet. This parody aimed at the issue of whether the newspaper, despite selling itself as having an impartial position, actually used such an appearance to serve its own political and commercial interests. Lino Bocchini and his brother, responsible for such a parody, were prosecuted and the dispute lasted for years in the Brazilian judiciary. The use of the copyright issue as a means of censorship in this case is obvious given that there are several publications that use typography similar to that of this São Paulo newspaper that were never notified in court, contrary to what happened with such a parody.
- 2010–2011: Legislation such as the Anti-Counterfeiting Trade Agreement (ACTA) and Stop Online Piracy Act (SOPA), which have led to large scale protests by activists, have been discussed in the context of enabling censorship by copyright.
- 2011 and 2015: Universal Music Group (UMG) suppressed political speech and ignored fair use by submitting Content ID claims and a DMCA takedown notice against a YouTube channel that included a speech by then-candidate Barack Obama. Obama's campaign frequently used Stevie Wonder's "Signed, Sealed, Delivered I'm Yours" and the YouTube video included a 34-second clip of the song that is copyrighted by UMG. The videos were taken down from YouTube.
- 2012: Danilo Gentili, a well-known Brazilian comedian and presenter, also used copyright censorship to ban a documentary produced dealing with the limits of humor published by La Sombra Ribeiro on YouTube. This issue was part of a series of developments in a fight that involved a discussion on Twitter and legal actions by both parties involved.
- 2013: In 2013, journalist Oliver Hotham published an interview on his blog with Straight Pride UK, a group that expressed support for Russian anti-LGBT law. Shortly afterward, Straight Pride UK attempted to have the interview removed from Hotham's hosting platform, WordPress.com, claiming that they hold the copyright to their responses and had not agreed to the publication. Hotham, with support from the blog's hosting platform, successfully challenged Straight Pride UK in court; however, he was unable to collect the financial compensation awarded to him, as the other party has disappeared.
- 2014: EFF claimed that a Spanish firm abuses DMCA to silence critics of Ecuador's government.
- 2014: In February 2014 several people involved with the AIDS denialism film House of Numbers: Anatomy of an Epidemic filed DMCA notices against a YouTube science blogger Myles Power, who had made a video series debunking claims made in the film. Power argued that the film was fair use as criticism and education. Several commentators described the notices as attempted censorship. The videos were restored several days later.
- 2020: Turkish Erdoğan administration has been using state-owned television channel TRT's status as a large rightsholder, which gives it access to YouTube's ContentID filtering system, to silence critical reporting on the government issuing false copyright claims to the Content ID system.
- 2021: Police officers in the United States played copyrighted music to disrupt recording and streaming of their actions by activists, intending to trigger automatic takedown of recorded content by automated copyright detection systems of online video hosting services.
- 2024: Badabun, a Mexican media company, registered and managed to remove a video from multiple internet pages for copyright reasons. It showed Jorge Máynez, a candidate for the 2024 Mexican presidential election, and Samuel García, the governor of Nuevo León, drinking alcoholic beverages at a soccer match and insulting the National Electoral Institute and opposition politicians.
- 2024: A judge in Tennessee ruled that the copyright of writings of the shooter responsible for the 2023 Nashville school shooting were held by the victims’ families and as such the writings cannot be released to the public.

== See also ==
- Collateral censorship
- Copyfraud
- Copyright misuse
- Corporate censorship
- Criticism of capitalism
- Defective by Design
- Financial censorship
- Lost sales
