= Censorship =

Suppression of speech and information

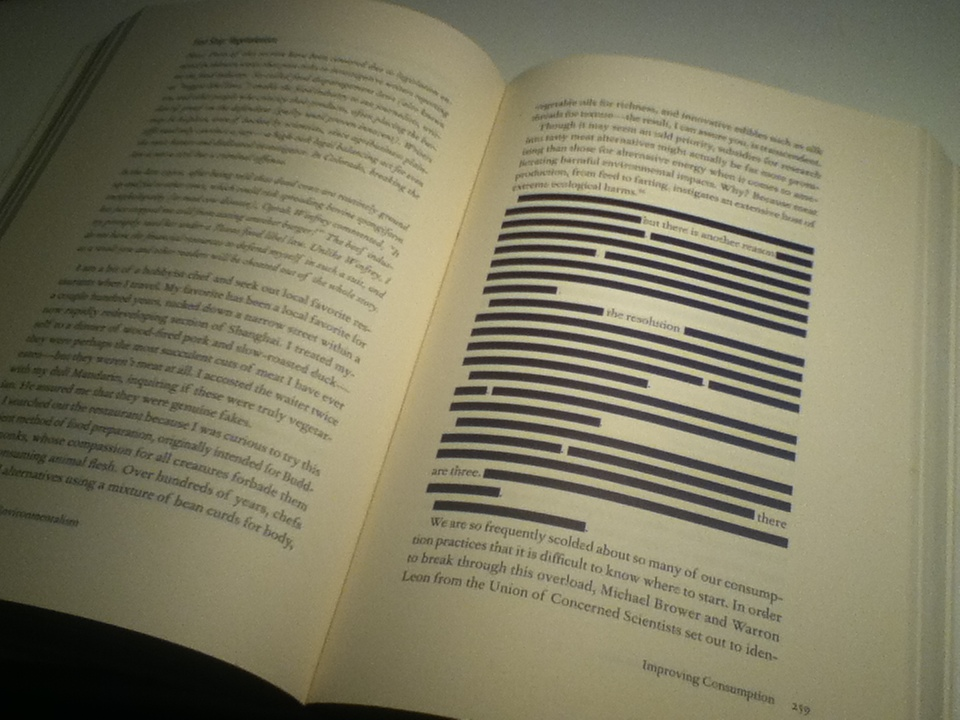
Censor bars are typically seen as a form of censorship.

Censorship is the suppression of speech, public communication, or other information. This may be done on the basis that such material is considered objectionable, harmful, sensitive, or "inconvenient". Censorship can be conducted by governments and private institutions. When an individual such as an author or other creator engages in censorship of their own works or speech, it is referred to as self-censorship. General censorship occurs in a variety of different media, including speech, books, music, films, and other arts, the press, radio, television, and the Internet for a variety of claimed reasons including national security, to control obscenity, pornography, and hate speech, to protect children or other vulnerable groups, to promote or restrict political or religious views, and to prevent slander and libel. Specific rules and regulations regarding censorship vary between legal jurisdictions and/or private organizations.

== Definition ==
There are many types of censorship.

Moral censorship is the removal of materials that are obscene or otherwise considered morally questionable. Pornography, for example, is often censored under this rationale, especially child pornography, which is illegal and censored in most jurisdictions in the world.

Military censorship is the process of keeping military intelligence and tactics confidential to safeguard national security and maintain public support. This is used to counter espionage.

Political censorship occurs when governments hold back information from their citizens. This is often done to exert control over the populace and prevent free expression that might foment rebellion.

Religious censorship is the means by which any material considered objectionable by a certain religion is removed. This often involves a dominant religion forcing limitations on less prevalent ones. Alternatively, one religion may shun the works of another when they believe the content is not appropriate for their religion.

Corporate censorship is the process by which editors in corporate media outlets intervene to disrupt the publishing of information that portrays their business or business partners in a negative light, or intervene to prevent alternate offers from reaching public exposure.

== Rationale and criticism ==
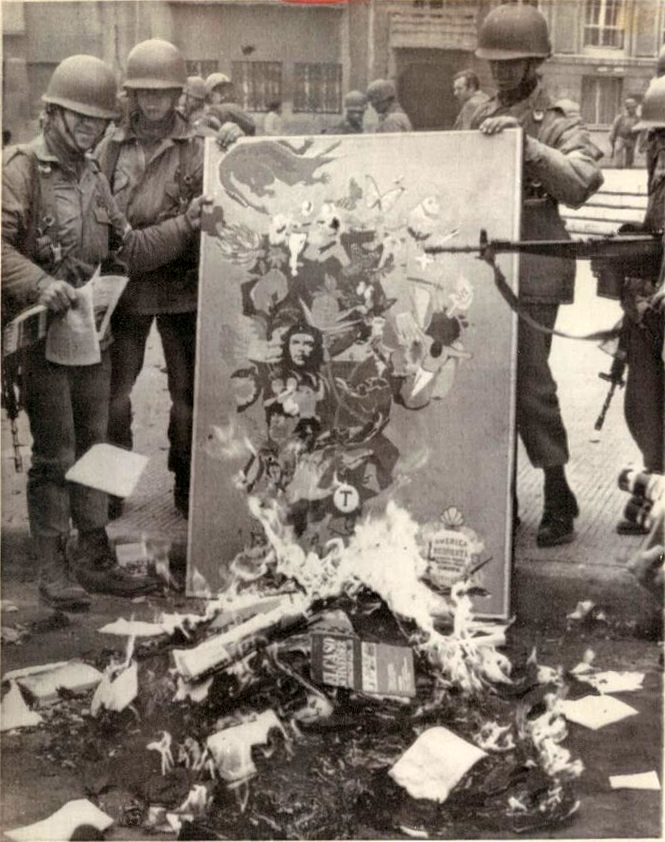
Book burning in Chile following the 1973 coup that installed the Pinochet regime

Censorship is often used to impose moral values on society, as in the censorship of material considered obscene. English novelist E. M. Forster was a staunch opponent of censoring material on the grounds that it was obscene or immoral, raising the issue of moral subjectivity and the constant changing of moral values. When the 1928 novel Lady Chatterley's Lover was put on trial in 1960, Forster wrote:

Lady Chatterley's Lover is a literary work of importance...I do not think that it could be held obscene, but am in a difficulty here, for the reason that I have never been able to follow the legal definition of obscenity. The law tells me that obscenity may deprave and corrupt, but as far as I know, it offers no definition of depravity or corruption.

In a 1997 essay, social commentator Michael Landier explains that censorship is counterproductive as it prevents the censored topic from being discussed. He expands his argument by claiming that those who impose censorship must consider what they censor to be true, as individuals believing themselves to be correct would welcome the opportunity to disprove those with opposing views.

Plato is said to have advocated censorship in his essay on The Republic, which opposed the existence of democracy. In contrast to Plato, Greek playwright Euripides (480–406 BC) defended the true liberty of freeborn men, including the right to speak freely.

In 1766, Sweden became the first country to abolish censorship by law.

== Types ==
=== Political ===
Political censorship is the censorship of political opinions in violation of freedom of speech, freedom of the press or freedom of assembly. Governments can attempt to conceal, fake, distort, or falsify information that its citizens receive by suppressing or crowding out political news that the public might receive through news outlets. In the absence of neutral and objective information, people will be prevented to dissent against the government or political party in charge. The government can enforce media bias to spread the story that the ruling authorities want people to believe. At times this involves bribery, defamation, imprisonment, and even assassination. The term also extends to the systematic suppression of views that are contrary to those of the government in power.

During the Allied occupation of Japan after World World II, any criticism of the Allies' pre-war policies, the SCAP, the Far East Military Tribunal, the inquiries against the United States and every direct and indirect references to the role played by the Allied High Command in drafting Japan's new constitution or to censorship of publications, movies, newspapers and magazines was subject to massive censorship, purges, media blackout. For the four years (1945–1949) the CCD was active, 200 million pieces of mail and 136 million telegrams were opened, and telephones were tapped 800,000 times. Since no criticism of the occupying forces for crimes such as the dropping of the atomic bomb, rape and robbery by U.S. soldiers was allowed, a strict check was carried out. Those who got caught were put on a blacklist called the watchlist, and the persons and the organizations to which they belonged were investigated in detail, which made it easier to dismiss or arrest them.

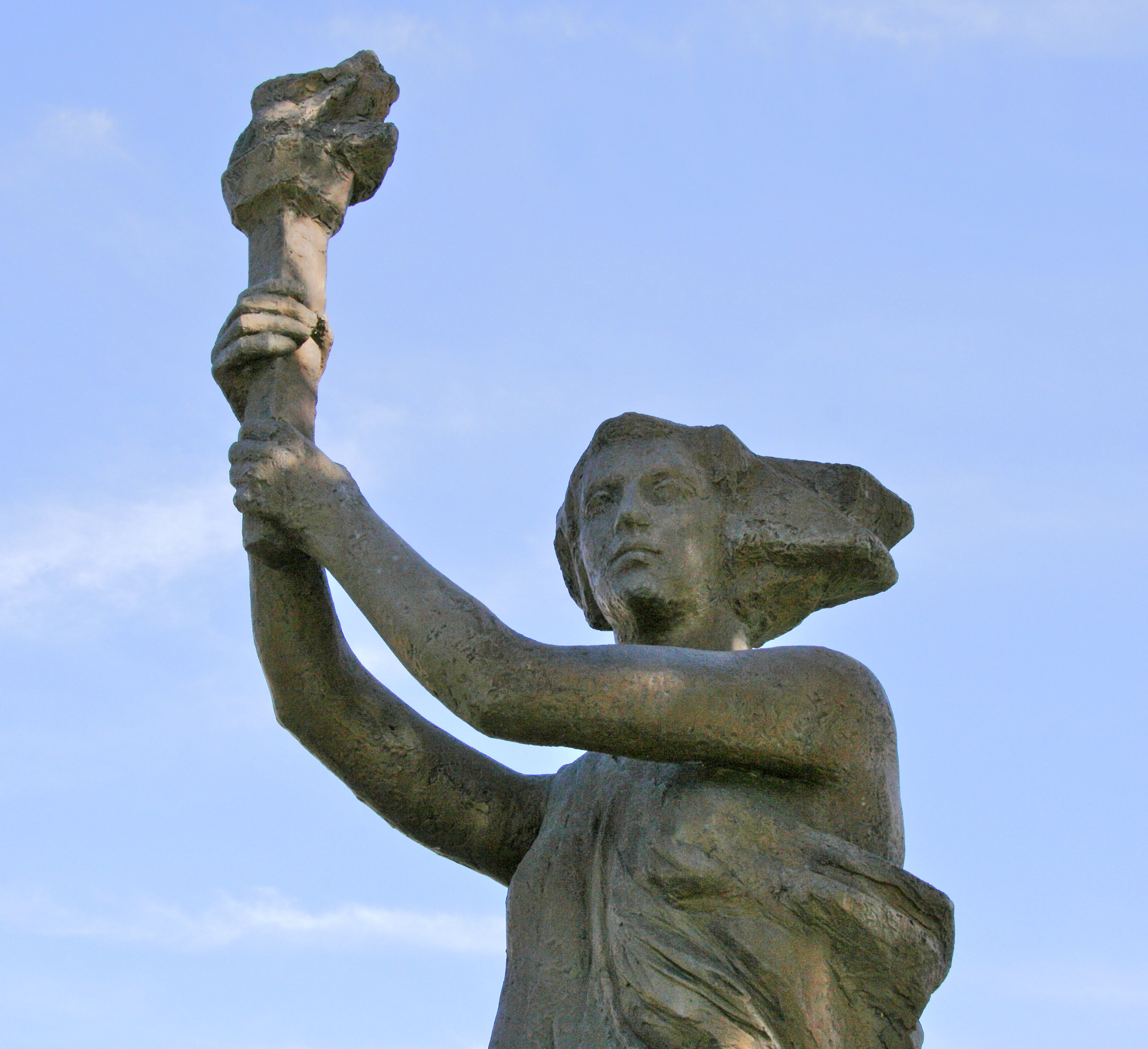
China destroyed the statue Goddess of Democracy during the Tiananmen Square protests of 1989

From 1956 until 1974, the Irish republican political party Sinn Féin was banned from participating in Northern Irish elections. From 1988 until 1994, the U.K. prevented media from broadcasting the voices (but not words) of Sinn Féin and ten Irish republican and Ulster loyalist groups.

According to India's Information Technology Rules 2011, objectionable content includes anything that "threatens the unity, integrity, defence, security or sovereignty of India, friendly relations with foreign states or public order".

Iraq under Baathist Saddam Hussein had much the same techniques of press censorship, as did Romania under Ceauşescu, but with greater potential violence.

Article 299 of the Turkish Penal Code deems it illegal to "Insult the President of Turkey". A person who is sentenced for a violation of this article can be sentenced to a prison term between one and four years and if the violation was made in public the verdict can be elevated by a sixth. Prosecutions often target critics of the government, independent journalists, and political cartoonists. Between 2014 and 2019, 128,872 investigations were launched for this offense and prosecutors opened 27,717 criminal cases.

In French-speaking Belgium, politicians considered far-right are banned from live media appearances such as interviews or debates.

=== State secrets and prevention of attention ===
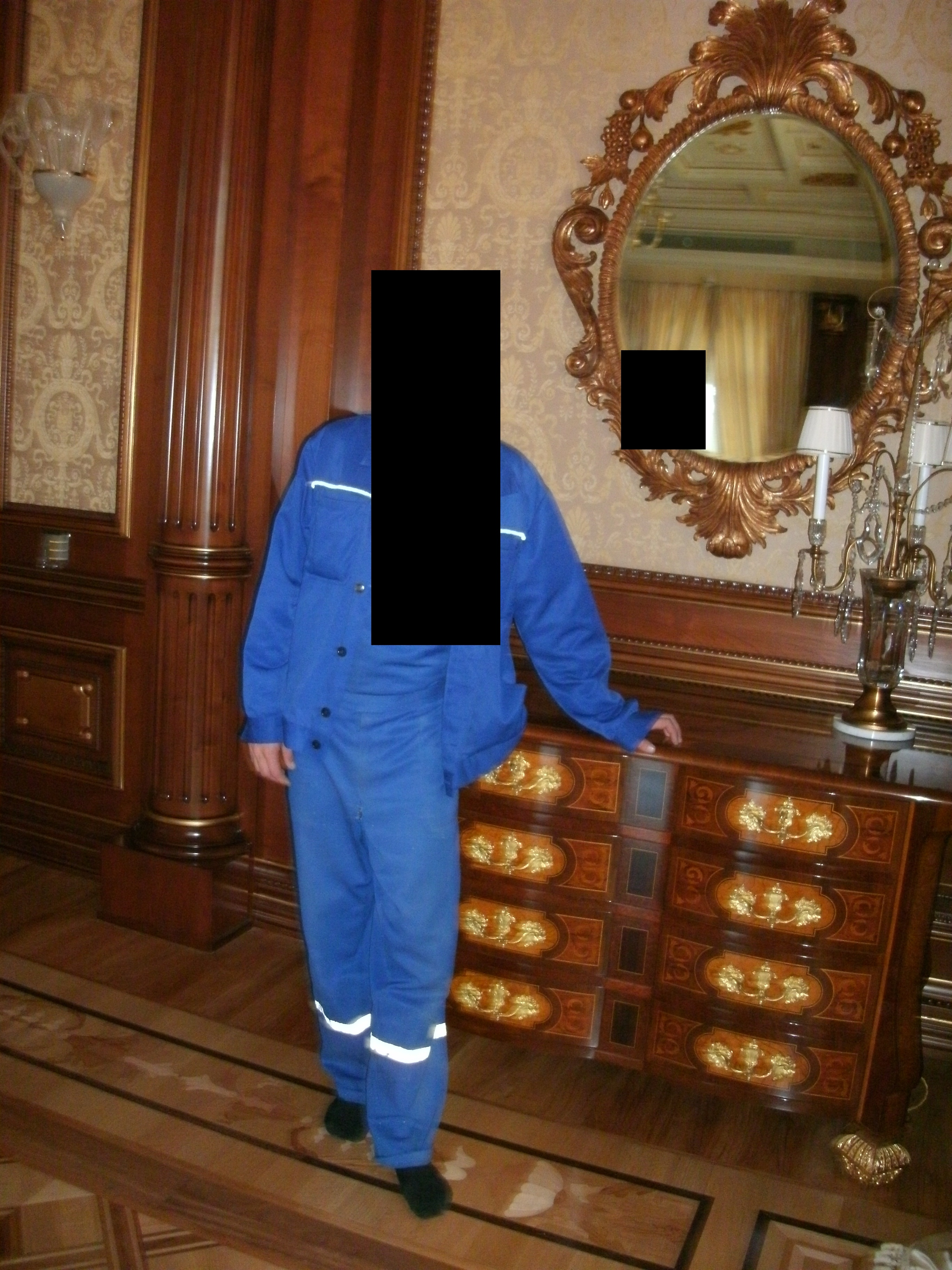
A visitor inside Putin's Palace in Russia, who presumably censored their face to avoid legal retaliation for distributing the photo

Censorship is occasionally carried out to aid authorities or to protect an individual, as with some kidnappings when attention and media coverage of the victim can sometimes be seen as unhelpful.

In wartime, explicit censorship is carried out with the intent of preventing the release of information that might be useful to an enemy. Typically it involves keeping times or locations secret, or delaying the release of information (e.g., an operational objective) until it is of no possible use to enemy forces. The moral issues here are often seen as somewhat different, as the proponents of this form of censorship argue that the release of tactical information usually presents a greater risk of casualties among one's own forces and could possibly lead to loss of the overall conflict.

During World War I, letters sent by British soldiers back to the U.K. would have to go through censorship. This consisted of officers going through letters with a black marker and crossing out anything which might compromise operational secrecy before the letter was sent. The World War II catchphrase "Loose lips sink ships" was used as a common justification to exercise official wartime censorship and encourage individual restraint when sharing potentially sensitive information.

=== Religion ===
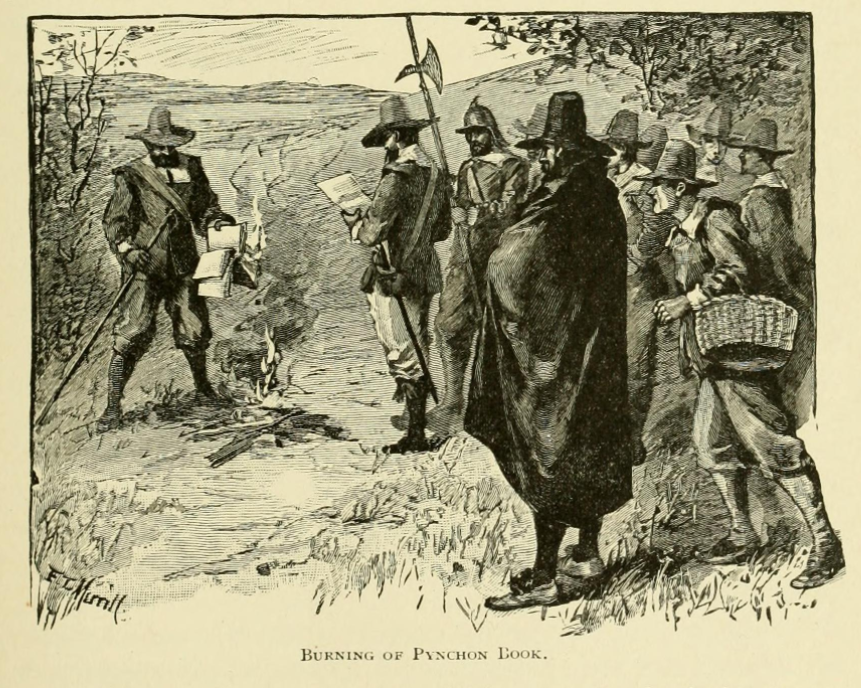
Portrayal of the burning of William Pynchon's 1650 critique on Puritanical Calvinism in the Puritan-controlled Massachusetts Bay Colony

Religious censorship is a form of censorship where freedom of expression is controlled or limited using religious authority or on the basis of the teachings of the religion. This form of censorship has a long history and is practiced in many societies and by many religions. Examples include the Galileo affair, Edict of Compiègne, the Index Librorum Prohibitorum (list of prohibited books) and the condemnation of Salman Rushdie's novel The Satanic Verses by Iranian leader Ayatollah Ruhollah Khomeini. Images of the Islamic figure Muhammad are also regularly censored, even in secular or less Islamic countries to avoid controversy.

Socrates, while defying attempts by the Athenian state of Ancient Greece to censor his philosophical teachings, was brought charges that led to his death. The conviction is recorded by Plato: in 399 BC, Socrates went on trial and was subsequently found guilty of both corrupting the minds of the youth of Athens and of impiety (asebeia, "not believing in the gods of the state"), and was sentenced to death.

The Constitution of India guarantees freedom of expression, but places certain restrictions on content, with a view towards maintaining communal and religious harmony, given the history of communal tension in the nation.

Under the Penang Islamic Religious Administration Enactment 2004, non-Muslims in Malaysia are penalized for speaking, writing, or publishing numerous words and phrases relevant to Islam, in any language or context, including: Allah, al Quran, fatwa, hadith, Haji, Kaaba, imam, and sheikh.

=== Educational sources ===
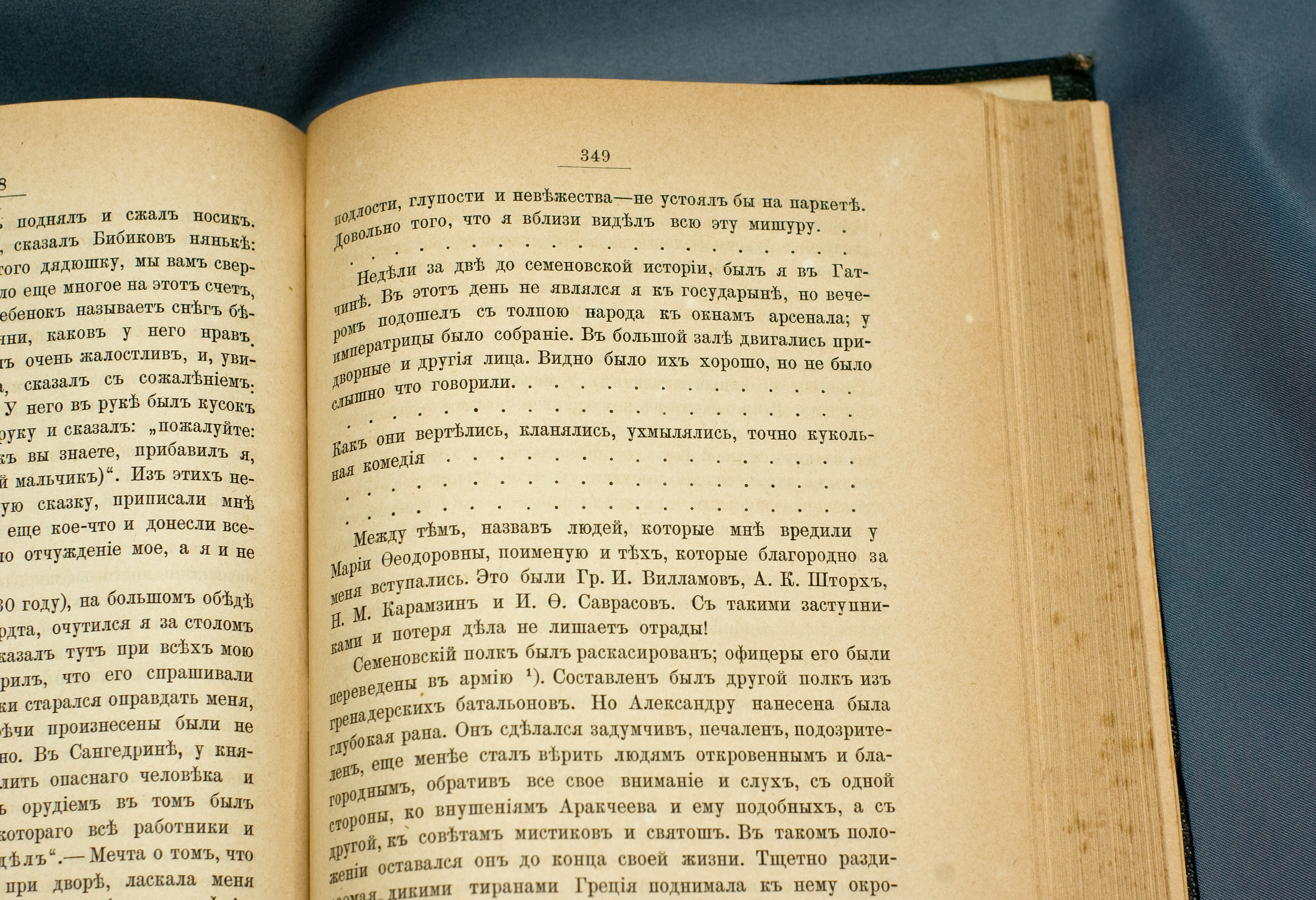
An 1886 book by Russian author N.I. Grech, which had some of its text censored and replaced with dots before publication

The way facts and history are presented in schools greatly influences students' interpretation of various subjects. One argument for censoring the type of information disseminated is based on the inappropriate quality of such material for the young people; what "inappropriate" means in this context is in itself controversial, as it has changed heavily. A Ballantine Books version of the book Fahrenheit 451, which is the version used by most school classes, contained approximately 75 separate edits, omissions, and changes from the author's original manuscript.

The content of school textbooks is often an issue. The term "whitewashing" is commonly used to refer to revisionism aimed at glossing over difficult or questionable historical events, or a biased presentation thereof. The reporting of military atrocities in history is extremely controversial, as in the case of the Holocaust (or Holocaust denial), bombing of Dresden, the Nanking Massacre, as found with Japanese history textbook controversies, the Armenian genocide, the Tiananmen Square protests of 1989, and the Winter Soldier Investigation of the Vietnam War.

On the censorship of critical perspectives of U.S. history in American schools, a study published by Indiana University in 2024 found that "in 16 Republican-dominated states, policies have been enacted to restrict the teaching of critical perspectives on race, sexuality, and other controversial subjects and to perpetuate a positive view of U.S. history". In 2019, Julia Carrie Wong wrote "today's reactionaries are picking up the mantle of generations of Americans who have fought to ensure that white children are taught a version of America's past that is more hagiographic than historic", with examples cited including Oregon enacting a law in the 1920s that banned the use of any textbook in schools that "speaks slightingly of the founders", to Lynne Cheney, the chair of the National Endowment for the Humanities, launching a campaign in the 1990s against an effort to introduce new standards for teaching U.S. history which she found insufficiently "celebratory".

Online access to all language versions of Wikipedia was blocked in Turkey on 29 April 2017 by Erdoğan's government.

=== Economic induced censorship ===
Economic induced censorship is a type of censorship enacted by economic markets to favor, and disregard, types of information. Economic induced censorship is also caused by market forces which privatize and establish commodification of certain information that is not accessible by the general public, primarily because of the cost associated with commodified information such as academic journals, industry reports and pay to use repositories.

The concept was illustrated as a censorship pyramid that was conceptualized primarily by Julian Assange, along with Andy Müller-Maguhn, Jacob Appelbaum and Jérémie Zimmermann, in the book Cypherpunks.

Amid declining car sales in 2020, France banned a television ad by a Dutch bike company, saying the ad "unfairly discredited the automobile industry".

=== Self-censorship ===
A PDF of 118 pages of the Epstein Files, U.S. federal records on child sex trafficker Jeffrey Epstein, that were blacked out by the Department of Justice before release in 2025

Self-censorship is the act of censoring or classifying one's own discourse. This is done out of fear of, or deference to, the sensibilities or preferences (actual or perceived) of others and without overt pressure from any specific party or institution of authority. Self-censorship is often practiced by film producers, film directors, publishers, news anchors, journalists, musicians, and other kinds of authors, including individuals who use social media.

According to a Pew Research Center and the Columbia Journalism Review survey, "About one-quarter of the local and national journalists say they have purposely avoided newsworthy stories, while nearly as many acknowledge they have softened the tone of stories to benefit the interests of their news organizations. Fully four-in-ten (41%) admit they have engaged in either or both of these practices."

Threats to media freedom have shown a significant increase in Europe in recent years, according to a study published in April 2017 by the Council of Europe. This results in a fear of physical or psychological violence, and the ultimate result is self-censorship by journalists.

=== Copy, picture, and writer approval ===
Copy approval is the right to read and amend an article, usually an interview, before publication. Many publications refuse to give copy approval but it is increasingly becoming common practice when dealing with publicity anxious celebrities. Picture approval is the right given to an individual to choose which photos will be published and which will not. Robert Redford is well known for insisting upon picture approval. Writer approval is when writers are chosen based on whether they will write flattering articles or not. American entertainment publicist Pat Kingsley is known for banning certain writers who wrote undesirably about one of her clients from interviewing any of her other clients.

=== Reverse censorship ===
Flooding the public, often through online social networks, with false or misleading information is sometimes called "reverse censorship". American legal scholar Tim Wu has explained that this type of information control, sometimes by state actors, can "distort or drown out disfavored speech through the creation and dissemination of fake news, the payment of fake commentators, and the deployment of propaganda robots."

=== Soft censorship ===
Soft censorship or indirect censorship is the practice of influencing news coverage for example by applying financial pressure on media companies that are deemed critical of a government or its policies and rewarding media outlets and individual journalists who are seen as friendly to the government.

=== Financial censorship ===
Financial censorship is when financial institutions and payment intermediaries debank accounts or inhibit transactions and influence what kind of speech can exist online. Perceived examples of financial censorship include:

- 2010 WikiLeaks financial censorship by Visa Inc. and Mastercard
- 2025 Steam (service) financial censorship by Mastercard

== By media ==
=== Literature ===
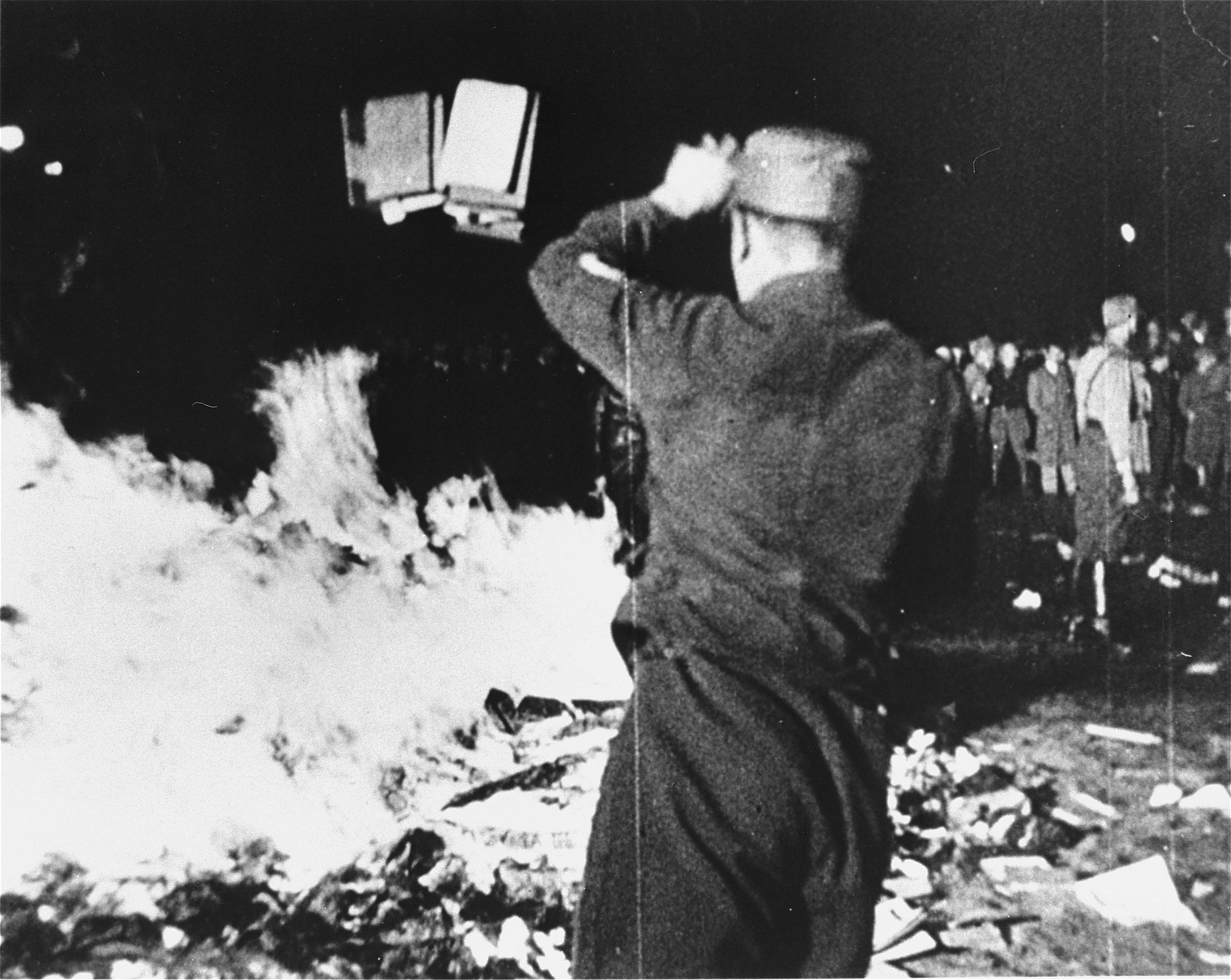
Nazi book burning in Berlin, May 1933

Book censorship can be enacted at the national or sub-national level, and can carry legal penalties for their infraction. Books may also be challenged at a local, community level. As a result, books can be removed from schools or libraries, although these bans do not typically extend outside of that area.

Throughout the Eastern Bloc, the various ministries of culture held a tight rein on their writers. Cultural products there reflected the propaganda needs of the state. Party-approved censors exercised strict control in the early years.

In 1973, a military coup took power in Uruguay, and the new government practiced censorship. For example, writer Eduardo Galeano was imprisoned and later was forced to flee. His book Open Veins of Latin America was banned by the right-wing military government, not only in Uruguay, but also in Chile and Argentina.

=== Journalism ===
Independent journalism did not exist in the Soviet Union until Mikhail Gorbachev became its leader. Gorbachev adopted glasnost (openness), political reform aimed at reducing censorship; before glasnost all reporting was directed by the Communist Party or related organizations. Pravda, the predominant newspaper in the Soviet Union, had a monopoly. Foreign newspapers were available only if they were published by communist parties sympathetic to the Soviet Union.

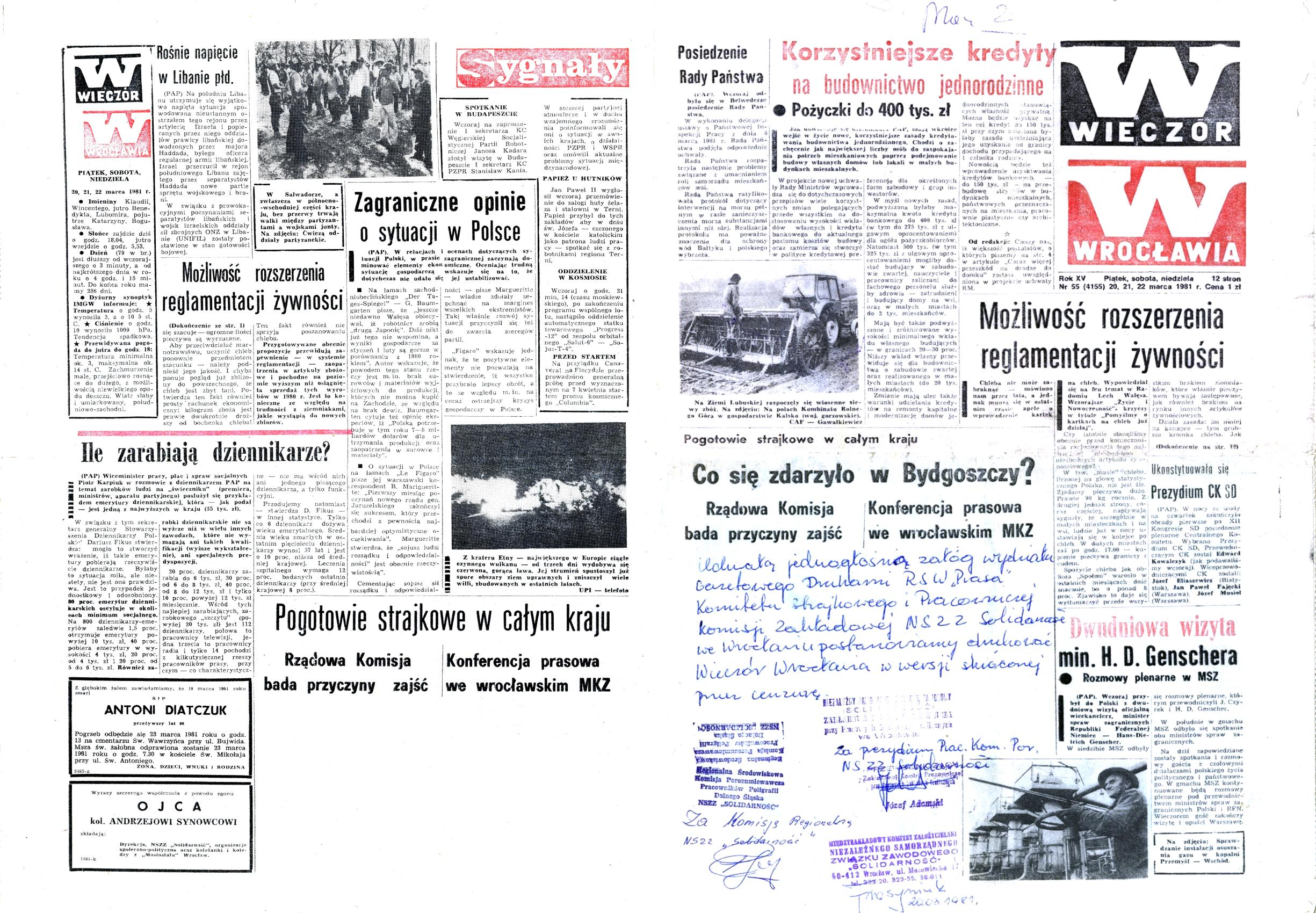
A 1981 newspaper in the Polish People's Republic, supporting the Solidarity trade union by censoring a government-mandated propaganda section

In the Eastern Bloc during the Cold War, possession and use of copying machines was tightly controlled in order to hinder the production and distribution of samizdat, illegal self-published books and magazines. Possession of even a single samizdat manuscript such as a book by Andrei Sinyavsky was a serious crime which might involve a visit from the KGB. Another outlet for works which did not find favor with the authorities was publishing abroad. In the U.S., under FCC v. Pacifica Foundation, the FCC has the power to prohibit the transmission of indecent material of obscene material over broadcast. Critics of campaign finance reform in the United States say this reform imposes widespread restrictions on political speech.

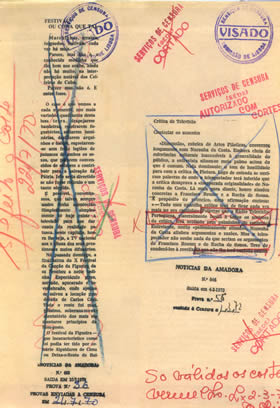
Censored pre-press proof of two articles from Notícias da Amadora, a Portuguese newspaper, 1970

According to Christian Mihr, executive director of Reporters Without Borders, "censorship in Serbia is neither direct nor transparent, but is easy to prove." He writes that Serbian prime minister Aleksandar Vučić has proved "very sensitive to criticism, even on critical questions," as was the case with Natalija Miletic, a correspondent for Deutsche Welle Radio, who questioned him in Berlin about the media situation in Serbia and about allegations that some ministers in the Serbian government had plagiarized their diplomas, and who later received threats and offensive articles on the Serbian press. Multiple news outlets have accused Vučić of anti-democratic strongman tendencies. In July 2014, journalists associations were concerned about the freedom of the media in Serbia, in which Vučić came under criticism. In September 2015, five members of U.S. Congress informed U.S. vice president Joseph Biden that Aleksandar's brother, Andrej Vučić, is leading a group responsible for deteriorating media freedom in Serbia.

Although the Russian Constitution has an article expressly prohibiting censorship, the Russian censorship apparatus Roskomnadzor ordered the country's media to only use information from Russian state sources or face fines and blocks. In March 2022, Russian president Vladimir Putin signed into law a bill introducing prison sentences of up to 15 years for those who publish "knowingly false information" about the Russian military and its operations, leading to some media outlets in Russia to stop reporting on Ukraine or shutting their media outlet. In March 2022, Novaya Gazeta suspended its print activities after receiving a second warning from Roskomnadzor. As of December 2022, more than 4,000 people were prosecuted under "fake news" laws in connection with the Russian invasion of Ukraine. Russian opposition politician Ilya Yashin was sentenced to eight-and-a-half years in prison for discussing the Bucha massacre in Ukraine on a YouTube stream.

=== Films ===
Aside from the usual justifications of pornography and obscenity, some films are censored due to changing racial attitudes or political correctness in order to avoid ethnic stereotyping and/or ethnic offense, despite its historical or artistic value. One example is the still withdrawn "Censored Eleven" series of animated cartoons.

Film censorship is carried out by various countries by censoring the producer or restricting a state citizen. For example, in China, the film industry censors LGBT-related films. Filmmakers must resort to finding funds from international investors, such as the Ford Foundation, and or produce through an independent film company.

In Singapore, the Films Act originally banned the making, distribution and exhibition of "party political films", with punishment being a fine or imprisonment. It defines a "party political film" as any film or video

(a) which is an advertisement made by or on behalf of any political party in Singapore or any body whose objects relate wholly or mainly to politics in Singapore, or any branch of such party or body; or
(b) which is made by any person and directed towards any political end in Singapore

In 2001, the short documentary called A Vision of Persistence, on opposition politician J. B. Jeyaretnam, was banned under this law. The makers of the documentary, all lecturers at the Ngee Ann Polytechnic, submitted written apologies, and withdrew the documentary from the 2001 Singapore International Film Festival. Another short documentary called Singapore Rebel by Martyn See, which documented Singapore Democratic Party leader Dr Chee Soon Juan's acts of civil disobedience, was banned from the 2005 Singapore International Film Festival. This law, is often disregarded when such political films are made supporting the ruling People's Action Party (PAP). Channel NewsAsia's documentary series on PAP ministers in 2005, for example, was not considered a party political film. Exceptions are also made for political films about other nations, such as Michael Moore's 2004 documentary Fahrenheit 911 about the U.S. In 2009, the law was amended to allow party political films as long as they were deemed factual and objective by a consultative committee.

In South Africa, the Film and Publication Board (FPB) refused classification of the documentary Hebrews to Negroes: Wake Up Black America in November 2026, citing Holocaust denial, the dehumanisation of Jewish people and the promotion of antisemitic views as grounds for finding that the film advocated hatred and incited harm. The decision prohibited its public distribution and exhibition in the country.

=== Music ===
Music censorship has been implemented by states, religions, educational systems, families, retailers, and lobbying groups.

=== Maps ===
Censorship of maps is often employed for military purposes. For example, the technique was used in former East Germany, especially concerning the areas near the border with West Germany, in order to make defection attempts more difficult. Censorship of maps is also applied by Google Maps, where certain areas are grayed or blacked out or are purposely left outdated with old imagery.

=== Art ===
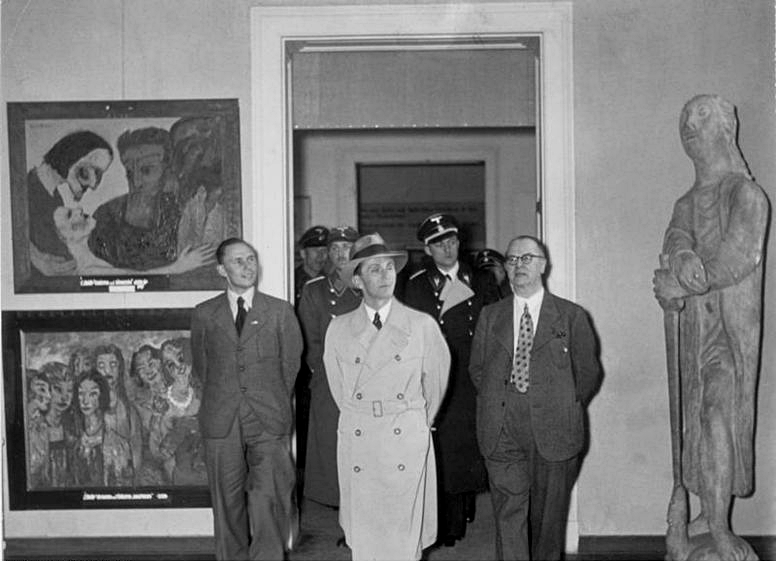
Nazi Germany banned art it deemed "degenerate", then displayed those banned works in the Degenerate Art Exhibition

An example of art censorship was the Nazis' requirements of using art as propaganda. Art was only allowed to be used as a political instrument to control people and failure to act in accordance with the censors was punishable by law, even fatal. The Degenerate Art Exhibition was a historical instance of this, the goal of which was to advertise Nazi values and slander others.

Destroying or oppressing art is often seen as justifying its meaning even more.

Moath al-Alwi, a prisoner at the Guantanamo Bay detention camp, creates model ships as an expression of art. Alwi does so with the few tools he has at his disposal such as dental floss and shampoo bottles, and he is also allowed to use a small pair of scissors with rounded edges. For some time, a few of Alwi's pieces, and some artworks of other Guantanamo prisoners, were on display at John Jay College of Criminal Justice in New York; by 2011, the military introduced a policy that disallowed artwork to leave the detention center. The artwork created by the prisoners became government property, which can be destroyed or disposed of in whatever way the government chooses.

From 1980 to 1993, Israel banned artworks composed mainly of black, red, white, and green, the four colors of the Palestinian flag

A 1980 Israeli law forbade banned artwork composed of the four colors of the Palestinian flag, and Palestinians were arrested for displaying such artwork or even for carrying sliced melons with the same pattern.

Around 300 artists in Cuba are fighting for their artistic freedom due to new censorship rules Cuba's government has in place for artists. In December 2018, following the introduction of new rules that would ban music performances and artwork not authorized by the state, performance artist Tania Bruguera was detained upon arriving to Havana and released after four days.

=== Photography ===
An example of "sanitization" policies comes from the Soviet Union under Joseph Stalin, where publicly used photographs were often altered to remove people whom Stalin had condemned to execution. Though past photographs may have been remembered or kept, this deliberate and systematic alteration to all of history in the public mind is seen as one of the central themes of Stalinism and totalitarianism.

British photographer, visual artist and convicted paedophile Graham Ovenden's photos and paintings were ordered to be destroyed by a London's magistrate court in 2015 for being "indecent" and their copies had been removed from the online Tate Gallery. Prior to his 2013 conviction British and American authorities had investigated his art as possible child pornography, and following the trial where he was charged with nine counts of indecency with a child and indecent assault on victims aged between six and 14, the Tate removed 34 of his images from its online collection, although it later reinstated images of three abstract landscapes.

In 2006, a National Geographic cover was censored by the Nashravaran Journalistic Institute of Iran. The offending cover, a picture of an embracing couple, was hidden beneath a white sticker.

=== Pornography ===
"Obscenity" in Canada, as defined in the landmark criminal case of R v Butler), is censored, which is generally limited to pornography and child pornography depicting sexual violence, degradation, or dehumanization, in particular that which causes harm (as in R v Labaye).

=== Internet ===
Internet censorship is the control or suppression of the publishing or accessing of information on the Internet. It may be carried out by governments or by private organizations either at the behest of the government or on their own initiative. Individuals and organizations may engage in self-censorship on their own or due to intimidation and fear.

The issues associated with Internet censorship are similar to those for offline censorship of more traditional media. One difference is that national borders are more permeable online: residents of a country that bans certain information can find it on websites hosted outside the country. Thus, censors must work to prevent access to information even though they lack physical or legal control over the websites themselves. This in turn requires the use of technical censorship methods that are unique to the Internet, such as site blocking and content filtering.

Internet censorship and surveillance by country (2018) Pervasive Substantial Selective Little or none Not classified / No data

Furthermore, the Domain Name System (DNS) a critical component of the Internet is dominated by centralized and few entities. The most widely used DNS root is administered by the Internet Corporation for Assigned Names and Numbers (ICANN). As an administrator they have rights to shut down and seize domain names when they deem necessary to do so and at most times the direction is from governments. This has been the case with Wikileaks shutdowns and name seizure events such as the ones executed by the National Intellectual Property Rights Coordination Center (IPR Center) managed by the Homeland Security Investigations (HSI). This makes it easy for internet censorship by authorities as they have control over what should or should not be on the Internet. Some activists and researchers have started opting for alternative DNS roots, though the Internet Architecture Board (IAB) does not support these DNS root providers.

Due to the underlying distributed technology of the Internet, total censorship of information online is very difficult or impossible to achieve, unless the censor has total control over all Internet-connected computers, such as in North Korea or Cuba. Pseudonymity and data havens (such as Freenet) protect free speech using technologies that guarantee material cannot be removed and prevents the identification of authors. Technologically savvy users can often find ways to access blocked content. Nevertheless, blocking remains an effective means of limiting access to sensitive information for most users when censors, such as those in China, are able to devote significant resources to building and maintaining a comprehensive censorship system.

China employs sophisticated censorship mechanisms, referred to as the Golden Shield Project, to monitor the Internet. Popular search engines such as Baidu also remove politically sensitive search results.

In Cuba, connection to the Internet is restricted and censored.

Views about the feasibility and effectiveness of Internet censorship have evolved in parallel with the development of the Internet and censorship technologies:

- A 1993 Time magazine article quotes computer scientist John Gillmore, one of the founders of the Electronic Frontier Foundation, as saying "The Net interprets censorship as damage and routes around it."
- In November 2007, "Father of the Internet" Vint Cerf stated that he sees government control of the Internet failing because the Web is almost entirely privately owned.
- A report of research conducted in 2007 and published in 2009 by the Berkman Klein Center for Internet & Society at Harvard University stated that: "We are confident that the [censorship circumvention] tool developers will for the most part keep ahead of the governments' blocking efforts", but also that "...we believe that less than two percent of all filtered Internet users use circumvention tools".
- In contrast, a 2011 report by researchers at the Oxford Internet Institute published by UNESCO concludes "... the control of information on the Internet and Web is certainly feasible, and technological advances do not therefore guarantee greater freedom of speech."

A BBC World Service poll of 27,973 adults in 26 countries, including 14,306 Internet users, was conducted between 30 November 2009 and 7 February 2010. The head of the polling organization felt, overall, that the poll showed that:

Despite worries about privacy and fraud, people around the world see access to the internet as their fundamental right. They think the web is a force for good, and most don't want governments to regulate it.

The poll found that nearly four in five (78%) Internet users felt that the Internet had brought them greater freedom, that most Internet users (53%) felt that "the internet should never be regulated by any level of government anywhere", and almost four in five Internet users and non-users around the world felt that access to the Internet was a fundamental right (50% strongly agreed, 29% somewhat agreed, 9% somewhat disagreed, 6% strongly disagreed, and 6% gave no opinion).

==== Social media ====
The rising use of social media in many nations has led to the emergence of citizens organizing protests through social media, sometimes called "Twitter Revolutions". The most notable of these social media-led protests were the Arab Spring uprisings, starting in 2010. In response to the use of social media in these protests, the Tunisian government began a hack of Tunisian citizens' Facebook accounts, and reports arose of accounts being deleted.

Automated systems can be used to censor social media posts, and therefore limit what citizens can say online. This most notably occurs in China, where social media posts are automatically censored depending on content. In 2013, Harvard political science professor Gary King led a study to determine what caused social media posts to be censored and found that posts mentioning the government were not more or less likely to be deleted if they were supportive or critical of the government. Posts mentioning collective action were more likely to be deleted than those that had not mentioned collective action. Currently, social media censorship appears primarily as a way to restrict Internet users' ability to organize protests. For the Chinese government, seeing citizens unhappy with local governance is beneficial as state and national leaders can replace unpopular officials. King and his researchers were able to predict when certain officials would be removed based on the number of unfavorable social media posts.

Research has proved that criticism is tolerable on social media sites, therefore it is not censored unless it has a higher chance of collective action. It is not important whether the criticism is supportive or unsupportive of the states' leaders, the main priority of censoring certain social media posts is to make sure that no big actions are being made due to something that was said on the internet. Posts that challenge the Party's political leading role in the Chinese government are more likely to be censored due to the challenges it poses to the Chinese Communist Party.

On the platform TikTok, certain hashtags have been categorized by the platform's code and determines how viewers can or cannot interact with the content or hashtag specifically. Some shadowbanned tags include: #acab, #GayArab, #gej due to their referencing of certain social movements and LGBTQ identity. As TikTok guidelines are becoming more localized around the world, some experts believe that this could result in more censorship than before.

=== Weather reports ===
In the Stalinist Eastern Bloc, the weather forecasts were changed if they suggested that the sun might not shine on May Day. Under Nicolae Ceauşescu in Romania, weather reports were doctored so that the temperatures were not seen to rise above or fall below the levels which dictated that work must stop.

=== Video games ===
Since the early 1980s, advocates of video games have emphasized their use as an expressive medium, arguing for their protection under the laws governing freedom of speech and also as an educational tool. Detractors argue that video games are harmful and therefore should be subject to legislative oversight and restrictions. Many video games have certain elements removed or edited due to regional rating standards. For example, in the Japanese and PAL Versions of No More Heroes, blood splatter and gore is removed from the gameplay. Decapitation scenes are implied, but not shown. Scenes of missing body parts after having been cut off, are replaced with the same scene, but showing the body parts fully intact.

== Impact of surveillance ==
Surveillance and censorship are different. Surveillance can be performed without censorship, but it is harder to engage in censorship without some form of surveillance. Even when surveillance does not lead directly to censorship, the widespread knowledge or belief that a person, their computer, or their use of the Internet is under surveillance can have a "chilling effect" and lead to self-censorship.

== Implementation ==
The former Soviet Union maintained a particularly extensive program of state-imposed censorship. The main organ for official censorship in the Soviet Union was the Chief Agency for Protection of Military and State Secrets generally known as the Glavlit, its Russian acronym. The Glavlit handled censorship matters arising from domestic writings of just about any kind – even beer and vodka labels. Glavlit censorship personnel were present in every large Soviet publishing house or newspaper; the agency employed 70,000 censors to review information before it was disseminated by publishing houses, editorial offices, and broadcasting studios. No mass medium escaped Glavlit's control. All press agencies and radio and television stations had Glavlit representatives on their editorial staffs.

Sometimes, public knowledge of the existence of a specific document is subtly suppressed, a situation resembling censorship. The authorities taking such action will justify it by declaring the work to be "subversive" or "inconvenient". An example is Michel Foucault's 1978 text Sexual Morality and the Law (later republished as The Danger of Child Sexuality), originally published as La loi de la pudeur [literally, "the law of decency"]. This work defends the decriminalization of statutory rape and the abolition of age-of-consent laws.

When a publisher comes under pressure to suppress a book, but has already entered into a contract with the author, they will sometimes effectively censor the book by deliberately ordering a small print run and making minimal, if any, attempts to publicize it. This practice became known in the early 2000s as privishing (private publishing). an OpenNet Initiative (ONI) classifications:

Cuban media used to be operated under the supervision of the Communist Party's Department of Revolutionary Orientation, which "develops and coordinates propaganda strategies".

== Concessions to avoid censorship ==
In the U.S., the Parental Advisory warning is displayed on record label-published music releases considered unsuitable for children. This system was decided by the Recording Industry Association of America in 1985, as a concession to deter any Congressional law censoring songs with violent, sexual, or anti-Christian lyrics. Such a law had been advocated for by activists striving for "family values" in American culture, but was considered by many musicians to be unconstitutional under the First Amendment—like Frank Zappa and John Denver, who testified to that effect to Congress. A similar concession was made by the U.S. video game industry in the 1990s, resulting from similar moral criticism; they created the Entertainment Software Rating Board (ESRB), which determines content age warnings for game packages in the U.S., Canada, and Mexico.

Adult content warnings for mass media in the United States

The Parental Advisory warning for music

An ESRB warning for video games

The MPAA warning for films minors can see in theaters if accompanied by an adult

The MPAA warning for films minors cannot see in theaters

A TV Parental Guidelines warning at the start of a cable TV program

== By country ==
Censorship for individual countries is measured by Freedom House (FH) Freedom of the Press report, Reporters Without Borders (RWB) Press freedom index and V-Dem government censorship effort index. Censorship aspects are measured by Freedom on the Net and OpenNet Initiative (ONI) classifications.

== See also ==
- Book censorship – Book removed or banned from public and/or private usage
- Censor bars – Basic form of censorship
- Censorship by proxy
- Censorship of LGBTQ issues
- Collateral censorship – Type of censorship of speech
- Deplatforming – Denying access to a platform to express opinions
- Eastern Bloc media and propaganda – State control of mass communications in the USSR and its European satellites
- Hays Code – U.S. film studio self-censorship rules (1930–1967)
- Imagocracy – Propaganda as governance
- Internet freedom – Digital rights, freedom of information and the right to Internet access and speech
- Mass media regulation – Laws on mass media
- Nineteen Eighty-Four – 1949 dystopian novel by George Orwell
- Orwellian – Adjective derived from the author George Orwell
- Parental controls – Software feature allowing content filtering
- Pirate Party – Type of political party
- Redaction – Removing sensitive information from a document to allow distribution
- Strategic lawsuit against public participation – Litigation to intimidate critics
- Streisand effect – Increased awareness of information after suppression efforts
- Taboo – Societal or cultural prohibition
