= Corporate censorship =

Censorship by corporations

Corporate censorship is censorship by corporations. It is when a spokesperson, employer, or business associate sanctions a speaker's speech by threat of monetary loss, employment loss, or loss of access to the marketplace. It is present in many different kinds of industries.

== By industry ==
=== E-commerce and technology ===
Corporate censorship in the E-commerce and technology industry is usually the explicit or implicit ban or suppression of certain material by a tech company from the product it offers. Earlier in 2018, Bloomberg reported that Google and Amazon are involved in a case of Russian censorship of a Russian company called Telegram. After Russian intelligence Federal Security Service (FSB) attempted to gain access to and found terrorist messages on Telegram, a messenger service in Russia with 15 million users, the app was banned by a Moscow court. In April 2018, Apple, Google, Amazon, and Microsoft were thanked by Telegram's founder for "not taking part in political censorship". It is said that Google and Amazon were thanked because they were possibly engaged in domain fronting, a technique that circumvents Internet censorship. However, things later changed as Google and Amazon disabled domain fronting and helped in the Russian censors' endeavor.

=== Art and music ===
Corporate censorship in the music industry involves the censorship of musicians' artistic works by the refusal to market or to distribute them. One example given by Jay is that of Ice-T altering the lyrics of "Cop Killer" as a result of the pressure applied to Time Warner by William Bennett along with various religious and advocacy groups.

The 2012 PEN World Voices Festival focused on corporate censorship in the publishing industry with Salman Rushdie, author of Satanic Verses, tackling censorship as "anti-creation". Giannina Braschi, author of United States of Banana, offered a critique of 21st century capitalism in which she condemned corporate censorship as financial control. Braschi declared: "Nobody owns a work of art, not even the artist."

DeeDee Halleck opines that describing the corporate censorship of independent artists, which she notes is often less overt in form, as self-censorship "smacks of blaming the victim". She describes such self-censorship as being simply a survival stratagem, the tailoring of an artist's choices to what is acceptable to those in power, based upon widespread knowledge of the acceptable themes and formats at institutions such as (her examples) the Public Broadcasting Service, the Whitney Biennial, the Museum of Modern Art, the Los Angeles Contemporary Exhibits gallery, or the Boston Institute of Contemporary Art.

=== Journalism, media, and entertainment ===
Croteau and Hoynes discuss corporate censorship in the news publishing business, observing that it can occur as self-censorship. They note that it is "virtually impossible to document", because it is covert. Jonathan Alter states that "In a tight job market, the tendency is to avoid getting yourself or your boss in trouble. So an adjective gets dropped, a story skipped, a punch pulled … It's like that Sherlock Holmes story – the dog that didn't bark. Those clues are hard to find." The head of the Media Access Project notes that such self-censorship is not misreporting or false reporting, but simply not reporting at all. Self-censorship is not the product of "dramatic conspiracies", according to Croteau and Hoynes, but simply the interaction of many small daily decisions. Journalists want to keep their jobs and editors support the interests of the company. These many small actions and non-actions accumulate to produce (in their words) "homogenized, corporate-friendly media".

Nichols and McChesney opine that "the maniacal media baron as portrayed in James Bond films or profiles of Rupert Murdoch is far less a danger than the cautious and compromised editor who seeks to 'balance' a responsibility to readers or viewers with a duty to serve his boss and the advertisers". They state that "even among journalists who entered the field for the noblest of reasons" there is a tendency to avoid any controversial journalism that might embroil the news company in a battle with a powerful corporation or a government agency. They observe that although such conflicts "have always been the stuff of great journalism" they are "very bad business", and that "in the current climate business trumps journalism just about every time".

Croteau and Hoynes report that such corporate censorship in journalism is commonplace, reporting the results of studies revealing that more than 40% of journalists and news executives stating that they had deliberately engaged in such censorship by avoiding newsworthy stories or softening the tones of stories. More than a third of the respondents stated that news organizations would ignore news that might hurt their financial interests. A similar fraction stated that they self-censored in order to further, or not endanger, their careers.

==== Specific case: Westway project ====
Halleck states that journalists are well aware of where self-censorship is required, and what they have to say or not say in their stories in order to keep their jobs. She gives Sydney Schanberg as an example. A high-profile, Pulitzer Prize-winning journalist Schanberg breached corporate censorship when reporting on corruption in New York City with regard to the Westway project. In Schanberg's column in The New York Times he asked why the Times was not investigating the issues, and was subsequently laid off. Halleck notes that the negative feedback that enforces corporate censorship is usually not as well documented as in the case of Schanberg, nor as clear-cut. Corporations may change the assignments of problem journalists, accept fewer stories from them, downgrade their office space, or deny them raises.

Self-censorship is not the only form of corporate censorship in the news and entertainment businesses. Croteau and Hoynes also describe managers censoring their employees, subdivisions of conglomerates applying pressure upon one another, and pressure applied upon corporations by external entities such as advertisers. They note that many incidents of corporate censorship are "unlikely to become public", but give the following (and several other) case studies of incidents of corporate censorship that have become part of the public record:

- The decision by the Walt Disney Company to prevent Miramax from releasing Fahrenheit 911 in 2004. (See Fahrenheit 9/11 controversy.) Croteau and Hoynes observe that this was a business decision, and state that "even when such business decisions are not politically motivated, then can have substantial political consequences".
- The decision in 1998 by HarperCollins to drop plans for publishing East and West, the memoirs of Chris Patten, out of concern it might affect the relationship between Star TV and the Chinese government. (Milner, who also cites this decision as an example, places them both alongside the decision by HarperCollins not to publicize Michael Moore's Stupid White Men and observes that Patten, as a member of the U.K. Conservative Party, demonstrates corporate censorship is not confined to left-wing writers such as Moore.)

An example given by Henry of censorship by a corporation rather than by a government is the censorship in May 2004 by The Sinclair Broadcasting Group of an issue of ABC News' Nightline entitled "The Fallen" wherein Ted Koppel recited the names and showed the faces of all Americans killed in action in Iraq. Sinclair, a strong proponent of the U.S. actions in Iraq, prohibited the six ABC affiliates that it owned from broadcasting the show, on the grounds that the program was "motivated by a political agenda designed to undermine the efforts of the United States in Iraq". (See Sinclair Broadcast Group#Nightline reading of the names and Nightline#Reading of the names.)

Milner also notes, in addition, the list of songs circulated by Clear Channel Communications, and the 2003 ban on the Dixie Chicks (see Clear Channel Communications#September 11.2C 2001 and Dixie Chicks#Political controversy), stating his inference that "these relatively public actions are merely the tip of a veritable iceberg of corporate censorship", and arguing that publishers are "by no means passive conduits for the transmission of cultural products from producers to consumers" but are influenced to take an active rôle in that transmission by motives of profit, ideology, values, or even reasons of state.

Major corporations such as Walmart are also responsible for such acts. They refuse to sell musical CDs produced by artists which contain parental advisory stickers on them to their customers. Because of this, artists who want to reach out to Walmart customers with their music need to change and edit their songs without any profanity in order for them to be put on shelves.

==== Media conglomeration ====
One of the incidents of corporate censorship that Croteau and Hoynes find to be "the most disturbing" in their view is the news reporting in the U.S. of the Telecommunications Act of 1996, which made fundamental changes to the limitations on ownership of media conglomerates within the U.S. and which was heavily lobbied for by media interests, and yet which was subject to, in Croteau and Hoynes' words, "remarkably little coverage" by U.S. news media. They report one study that found that in the nine months between the introduction of the bill into Congress and its passage in February 1996, there were only 12 major stories, comprising 19.5 minutes of air time, about the Act on the three major U.S. television networks, with much of this coverage focussing upon television content ratings and the V-chip and "largely ignor[ing]" the major changes to the media ownership rules. Croteau and Hoynes observe that history repeated itself with the 2003 review by the FCC of the media ownership rules, with a study by American Journalism Review concluding that the plan to alter the ownership regulations in favor of "a handful of large companies" was "barely mentioned" by most newspapers and broadcast outlets that were owned by those companies.

Croteau and Hoynes state that this "inadequate" coverage of the legislation and FCC actions suggests a built-in conflict of interest for news media – one that is not just limited to television and radio news media, given that many newspapers are also owned by the same corporations that own the television and radio stations. Reporting fully the views of critics of the legislation would have been counter to the economic interests of the news media companies which benefited directly from the legislation, lobbied in its favour, and even helped to draft it. This conflict of interest was observed by John McCain during debate of the Telecommunications Act in the U.S. Senate, who stated that "You will not see this story on any television or hear it on any radio broadcast because it directly affects them." Sohn similarly observed, in a 1998 critique of the deregulation by the Telecommunications Act, that increased concentration of media ownership "often leads to a type of corporate censorship by which information affecting the large media company's economic interest is kept from the public's eyes and ears".

Nichols and McChesney similarly observe that the exclusion of Ralph Nader from the three presidential debates in the 2000 presidential race by television networks guaranteed that the debates would not address controversial issues of media conglomeration. They note with irony that this was seemingly against the self-interests of the television stations, since it served to also reduce public interest in the televised presidential debates by rendering them, in their view, "duller than dirt agreeathons" that viewers would not be interested in watching.

== Notable cases ==
=== Amazon ===
Amazon, as one of the largest e-commerce businesses in the United States, has been involved in controversies that point to its censorship-like actions. In 2010, Macmillan Publishers, along with some other publishers, asked Amazon to increase the prices of the electronic books it offered for sale on Amazon by 50% from $9.99 to $15, after obtaining permission from Apple to raise its prices, who was more lenient in allowing the publishers to determine prices themselves. Amazon disagreed with its proposal, and they didn't reach a consensus on how to deal with this problem. Amazon later removed all books published by Macmillan Publishers, including electronic books and physical books, from the website. Later, Amazon "surrendered" to Macmillan Publishers' request of price increase.

Amazon has also engaged in activities where it censored customers' negative reviews. For example, in 2012, authors Joe Konrath and Steve Weddle reported that Amazon deleted their reviews in response to a wave of "sock puppet" controversies. In the scandal, many authors used anonymous accounts on Amazon to provide positive reviews for their own books and negative reviews for the competitors' work, on grounds not of quality but of who wrote the books. Amazon sought to rectify this problem by prohibiting authors from publishing reviews about other writers' works.

In 2013, a British website the Kernel published an article accusing Amazon, Kobo, and other e-book retailers of containing books with erotic material such as "rape, incest, and 'forced sex' with young girls". It turned out that these were books written by self-published writers who wrote erotica books. Amazon responded to the Kernel's article by removing books under the categories mentioned in the article, including books depicting rape, incest, and child pornography. In response, some self-published writers engaged in a protest against Amazon's censorship, which had implicated some books that did not include erotic material as offensive as what Amazon should be and was targeting.

In 2014, in an effort to exert more control on online pricing, Amazon banned preorders of Captain America: The Winter Soldier in disc form. It was a continuation of similar strategies that Amazon once used with book publisher Hachette and film studio Warner Bros. Because the movie studios needed the sales profits from DVDs and Blu-rays while Amazon could afford losing one customer, Amazon used this technique to add pressure on Walt Disney Co. for more pricing power.

In January 2021, after Google and Apple removed Parler's app from their respective app stores in response to its use in the January 6 attack, Amazon also took down Parler's AWS servers, effectively removing the service from the internet. Parler has sued in response for breach of contract and antitrust violations.

=== Google ===
One of the censorship practices Google is involved in is the censorship of information on Google China. Before Google's service was disabled in China, it complied with China's Internet policies and removed some content not appropriate to appear in the Chinese context. Google was criticized for violating its principle of promoting "a generally open Internet". Google's CEO at the time, Eric Schmidt, affirmed Google's commitment to this, and also mentioned that complying with China's regulations was better than not being present the Chinese market at all. In January 2010, Google made an announcement that it wouldn't engage in further censoring activities. In September 2010, Google launched Google Transparency to share information about governments' and corporations' activities regarding information access and control.

There are increasing instances across the world that involve censorship in Google, banning information from the general population. Google Maps' Street View, for example, does not cover military bases in the U.S. out of security concerns. The European Union also suggested that the Street View violates EU privacy laws.

=== Facebook ===
Facebook is a site in which people frequently publish information on their political stances or engage in political and social debates. Since 2009, Facebook has been supporting the rights of Holocaust deniers on posting on its website. In 2018, however, Facebook announced a new policy that it will remove "misinformation that contributes to violence," while not enforcing a complete censor on those speeches. Mark Zuckerberg, Facebook's CEO, said that there are certain information people post because they took it wrong, but perhaps not because they intentionally took it wrong. Even if they did it on purpose, Facebook couldn't have found out their intentions and wouldn't try to do so. Thus, they are reviewing information on Facebook and taking down misrepresented, misleading, or offensive information, but not outright censoring information in certain categories, such as Holocaust denial. As a result of this policy, posts that falsely report on Muslims and Buddhists in Sri Lanka were removed.

In 2018, Facebook removed hundreds of pages related to U.S. politics on grounds of "inauthentic activity" one month before the midterm elections. Facebook representatives claimed that the posts and user accounts were deleted not because of the content of the posts, but because they violated Facebook's terms of service.

Facebook has a set of community standards governing users' behaviors. These standards detail Facebook's policies on topics including "hate speech, violent imagery, misrepresentation, terrorist propaganda and disinformation". Facebook mentioned its intention to let the users dispute its decisions by disclosing their standards. Facebook also wishes to assuage the concerns of critics who accused it of mistakenly or unjustifiably removing contents before. The process which Facebook uses to delete posts and block accounts was not transparent and the criteria not explicitly stated. In November 2018, Facebook published its first Transparency Report on how the Community Standards are adhered to in regulating the languages that appear on Facebook.

=== Qantas ===
In 2014, the Australian airline Qantas stopped supplying The Sydney Morning Herald and The Age at its boarding gates and dropped the two Fairfax Media titles from a national advertising campaign, after a front-page article by Adele Ferguson calling for the resignation of chief executive Alan Joyce. Qantas said it chose media outlets "on the basis of who can most effectively reach our existing and potential customer base"; Fairfax said its "commercial relationships have no bearing on editorial decisions". The journalist Joe Aston later wrote that about A$2 million of advertising was withdrawn and that Joyce had said there was "no point running Qantas ads in newspapers that carried negative stories about it".

In June 2015, Qantas obtained an injunction in the Supreme Court of New South Wales restraining a Qantas speechwriter, Lucinda Holdforth, from publishing Fighting Words, a manuscript dealing in part with the 2011 grounding of its fleet, saying she had sought "to exploit for personal gain confidential internal information that she was privy to". The restraint was continued by consent and without admissions. The proceedings settled the following month on confidential terms that made the injunction permanent, which Qantas attributed to "the commercial in confidence nature of the content".

In May 2023, Qantas removed The Australian Financial Review from its airport lounges and blocked its content on in-flight Wi-Fi, ending a distribution agreement with the publisher, Nine Entertainment, following criticism of Joyce in the paper's Rear Window column; Qantas declined to comment. Nine's managing director of publishing, James Chessell, said the airline "can't countenance robust criticism". Michael Miller, executive chairman of the rival publisher News Corp Australia, described the action as "a form of corporate cancel culture" and said he took "exception to the pressure put on journalists and the media to stifle free speech". The Australian Broadcasting Corporation media criticism program Media Watch examined the episode. The paper reported a further removal from the Chairman's Lounge on August 19, 2025, the day its front page carried an A$90 million penalty imposed on the airline for unlawfully outsourcing ground-handling jobs, which Qantas called a mistake and reversed.

== Debates ==
=== TV Guide debate ===
In 1969, Nicholas Johnson, United States Federal Communications Commission (FCC) commissioner, and then president of CBS News Richard Salant, debated the scope and existence of corporate censorship in a series of articles published in TV Guide.

==== Johnson ====
Johnson's view, put forward in an article entitled The Silent Screen is that "Censorship is a serious problem" in the United States, and that he agrees with the statements by various network officials that television is subject to it, but disputes "just who is doing most of the censoring". He states that most television censorship is corporate censorship, not government censorship. One of the several examples that he gives in support of this argument is that of WBAI in New York City, which the FCC declined to censure for the publication a poem that was alleged to be anti-Semitic. He argues that "[m]any broadcasters are fighting, not for free speech, but for profitable speech. In the WBAI case, for example, one of the industry's leading spokesmen, Broadcasting magazine, actually urged that WBAI be punished by the FCC – and on the same editorial page professed outrage that stations might not have an unlimited right to broadcast profitable commercials for cigarettes which may result in illness or death."

Johnson quotes examples of corporate censorship reported by Stan Opotowsky in TV – The Big Picture: "Ford deleted a shot [of] the New York skyline because it showed the Chrysler building [...] A breakfast-food sponsor deleted the line 'She eats too much' from a play because, as far as the breakfast-food company was concerned, nobody could ever eat too much." He quotes Bryce Rucker writing in The First Freedom that "Networks generally have underplayed or ignored events and statements unfavorable to food processors and soap manufacturers". He notes that "corporate tampering with the product of honest and capable journalists and creative writers and performers can be quite serious". He points to a 3 September 1969 report by Variety that ABC "had tailored some of its documentaries to fit the corporate desires of Minnesota Mining & Manufacturing Company", and cites examples given by Bill Greeley in a 4 February 1970 Variety article of "shrunken or vanished" documentaries at CBS, which have been "shelved, turned down, or killed".

He also gives several examples of television network officials who have resigned over issues of corporate censorship: Fred Friendly resigning from CBS News because on 10 February 1966 it did not televise the Senate hearings on the Vietnam War; the head of the National Association of Broadcasters Code Authority resigning "in disgust over the hypocrisy exhibited by the NAB's stand on cigarette advertisements".

He points out several commonalities in a long list of incidents that he cites:

- the involvement of human death, disease, dismemberment, or degradation;
- the existence of great profit for manufacturers, advertisers, and broadcasters; and
- the deliberate withholding of needed information from the public.

Johnson states that "many pressures produce such censorship", some deliberate and some by default, but that "all have come, not from government, but from private corporations with something to sell". He notes an exchange in the letters page of The New York Times between Charles Tower, chairman of the National Association of Broadcasters Television Board and a reader, with Tower saying "There is a world of difference between the deletion of program material by Government command and the deletion by a private party [such as a broad-caster] [...] Deletion by Government command is censorship [...] Deletion of material by private parties [...] is not censorship." but his respondent rebutting this with "Mr. Tower's distinction [...] is spurious. The essence of censorship is the suppression of a particular point of view [...] over the channels of the mass media, and the question of who does the censoring is one of form only." Johnson concurs with the latter view, stating that the outcome is the same.

==== Salant ====
Salant's view, put forward in an article entitled He Has Exercised His Right – To Be Wrong was that Johnson was "totally completely, 100 percent wrong – on all counts", providing many examples of CBS' coverage of the things enumerated by Johnson, saying, "In the 11 years I was a CBS corporate officer and in the six years that I have been president of CBS News, to my knowledge there is no issue, no topic, no story which CBS News has ever been forbidden, or instructed directly or indirectly, to cover or not to cover, by corporate management."

== Internet ==
The constitutional and other legal protections that prohibit or limit government censorship of the Internet in some countries do not generally apply to private corporations. Corporations may voluntarily choose to limit the content they make available or allow others to make available on the Internet. Or corporations may be encouraged by government pressure or required by law or court order to remove or limit Internet access to content that is judged to be obscene (including child pornography), harmful to children, defamatory, pose a threat to national security, promote illegal activities such as gambling, prostitution, theft of intellectual property, hate speech, and inciting violence.

Corporations that provide Internet access for their employees, customers, students, or members will sometimes limit this access in an attempt to ensure it is used only for the purposes of the corporation. This can include content-control software to limit access to entertainment content in business and educational settings and limiting high-bandwidth services in settings where bandwidth is at a premium. Some institutions also block outside e-mail services as a precaution, usually initiated out of concerns for local network security or concerns that e-mail might be used intentionally or unintentionally to allow trade secrets or other confidential information to escape.

Some websites that allow user-contributed content may practice self-censorship by adopting policies on how the web site may be used and by banning or requiring pre-approval of editorial contributions from users that do not follow the policies for the site.

In 2007, Verizon attempted to block the abortion rights group NARAL Pro-Choice America from using their text messaging services to speak to their supporters. Verizon claims it was in order to enforce a policy that doesn't allow their customers to use their service to communicate "controversial" or "unsavory" messages. Comcast, AT&T and many other ISP's have also been accused of regulating internet traffic and bandwidth.

In February 2008, the Bank Julius Baer v. WikiLeaks lawsuit prompted the United States District Court for the Northern District of California to issue a permanent injunction against the website WikiLeaks' domain name registrar. The result was that WikiLeaks could not be accessed through its web address. This elicited accusations of censorship and resulted in the Electronic Frontier Foundation stepping up to defend WikiLeaks. After a later hearing, the injunction was lifted.

On 1 December 2010, Amazon.com cut off WikiLeaks 24 hours after being contacted by the staff of Joe Lieberman, Chairman of the U.S. Senate Committee on Homeland Security. In a statement Lieberman said:

[Amazon's] decision to cut off WikiLeaks now is the right decision and should set the standard for other companies WikiLeaks is using to distribute its illegally seized material. I call on any other company or organization that is hosting WikiLeaks to immediately terminate its relationship with them.

Constitutional lawyers say that this is not a first amendment issue because Amazon, as a private company, is free to make its own decisions. Kevin Bankston, a lawyer with the Electronic Frontier Foundation, agreed that this is not a violation of the first amendment, but said it was nevertheless disappointing. "This certainly implicates first amendment rights to the extent that web hosts may, based on direct or informal pressure, limit the materials the American public has a first amendment right to access".

eNom, a private domain name registrar and Web hosting company operating in the U.S., disables domain names which appear on a U.S. Treasury Department blacklist.

In January 2007, Eli Lilly and Company obtained a restraining order from a U.S. District Court that forbade activists in the psychiatric survivors movement from posting links on their websites to ostensibly leaked documents which purportedly showed that Eli Lilly and Company intentionally withheld information as to the lethal side-effects of Zyprexa. The Electronic Frontier Foundation appealed this as prior restraint on the right to link to and post documents, saying that citizen-journalists should have the same First Amendment rights as major media outlets. It was later held that the judgment was unenforceable, though First Amendment claims were rejected.

Schools and libraries may use Internet filters to block material deemed inappropriate for the school or library setting or inappropriate for children, including pornography, advertising, chat, gaming, social networking, and online forum sites.

Public and private K-12 schools and libraries in the U.S. that accept funds from the federal E-rate program or LSTA grants for Internet access or internal connections are required by CIPA to have an "Internet safety policy and technology protection measures in place".

According to the National Conference of State Legislatures, in September 2013:

- 12 U.S. states had Internet filtering laws that apply to publicly funded schools or libraries,
- 14 states required school boards or public libraries to adopt Internet use policies to prevent minors from gaining access to sexually explicit, obscene or harmful materials, and
- 5 states require Internet service providers to make a product or service available to subscribers to control use of the Internet.

Some corporations practice greater levels of self-censorship in international versions of their online services. This is most notably the case in these corporations' dealings in China.

=== Corporate Enemies of the Internet ===
On 12 March 2013 Reporters Without Borders published a Special report on Internet Surveillance. The report included a list of "Corporate Enemies of the Internet", companies that sell products that are liable to be used by governments to violate human rights and freedom of information. The five "Corporate Enemies of the Internet" named in March 2013 were: Amesys (France), Blue Coat Systems (U.S.), Gamma (UK and Germany), Hacking Team (Italy), and Trovicor (Germany), but the list was not exhaustive and is likely to be expanded in the future.

== See also ==
- Ag-gag
- Censorship by Apple
- Censorship by copyright
- Collateral censorship
- Corporate censorship in the United States
- Corporate secrecy
- DMCA takedown notice
- Financial censorship
- Food libel laws
- Chinese censorship abroad
- Regional lockout
- Strategic lawsuit against public participation aka "SLAPP"
