= Internet intermediary =

Internet intermediary refers to a company that facilitates the use of the Internet. Such companies include internet service providers (ISPs), search engines and social media platforms.

== Definition ==
According to OECD, and cited by UNESCO, Internet intermediaries can be defined as organizations (primarily, for-profit companies) that "bring together or facilitate transactions between third parties on the Internet. They give access to, host, transmit and index content, products and services originated by third parties on the Internet or provide Internet-based services to third parties" and lists the following organizations as fitting this definition:

1. Internet access and service providers (ISPs);
2. Data processing and web hosting providers, including domain name registrars;
3. Internet search engines and portals;
4. E-commerce intermediaries, where these platforms do not take title to the goods being sold;
5. Internet payment systems; and
6. Participative networking platforms, which include Internet publishing and broadcasting platforms that do not themselves create or own the content being published or broadcast.

== UNESCO study of 2014 ==
In 2014 UNESCO released a report on the Internet intermediaries relation to digital rights worldwide. It found that Operations of internet intermediaries are heavily influenced by the legal and policy environments of states.

According to the UNESCO study, levels of transparency of Internet service providers on matters related to privacy and surveillance are very low. Data protection practices varied widely in tandem with whether or not countries had data protection laws. Few companies make an effort to be transparent about how they respond to government requests, or speak up for their users, even in relatively open political and media environments. Some companies do not have publicly available privacy policies for their core services.

Search engines’ policies and practices related to content restriction and manipulation are shaped by their home jurisdictions and to varying degrees by other jurisdictions in which they operate. The stricter the intermediary liability regime in a given jurisdiction, the more likely content is to be removed either proactively by the company or upon request by authorities without challenge. Without government transparency, company transparency reports are the only way for users to ascertain the extent and nature of requests being made. While such transparency reports are presented by American Google search engine, they are not released by Russian Yandex and Chinese Baidu companies.

For the two platforms with international user bases (Facebook and Twitter), UNESCO researchers identified tensions between the companies’ own policies and practices and governments’ laws and regulations. The policies and practices of the more domestically focused platforms more closely mirror home governments’ expectations and requirements. Companies are much more transparent about how they respond to government requests than they are about the nature and volume of content restricted for violation of their own private rules. There is significant concern amongst some human rights advocates, including for example those working to stop gender-based violence and online hate speech, about companies’ lack of communication with users about how terms of service are developed, interpreted and enforced.

UNESCO recommended that

1) laws and regulations governing intermediaries should be consistent with international human rights norms, including the right to freedom of expression;
2) laws, regulations and governmental policies, as well as corporate policies and rules, should be developed in consultation with all affected stakeholders;
3) transparency reporting and other actions to communicate with the public about company policy and practice should be comprehensive and sufficiently standardized so that it is possible to compare and analyze datasets across multiple companies;
4) data protection regimes at the national level are vital, as are legal frameworks and other mechanisms to ensure that government access to user data and company practices in handling government requests are based on strict principles of necessity, proportionality, and accountability in terms of remedial mechanisms;
5) Intermediaries’ private rules and accompanying enforcement processes, as well as government-supported efforts by companies to collectively self-regulate, should be compatible with human rights norms, including the right to freedom of expression. They should adhere to core principles of accountability, transparency and due process;
6) It should be possible for people to report grievances and obtain redress from private intermediaries as well as from state authorities, including from national-level human rights institutions;
7) In order for freedom of expression to be protected and respected online, governments and companies have a responsibility to consult with stakeholders on their laws and rules and explain them clearly. They also have an obligation to educate users about their rights so that people can understand and effectively exercise them; recognize when their rights have been restricted, violated, or otherwise interfered with; and know where and how to report grievances and seek redress; and
8) Stakeholders concerned with protecting online freedom of expression should consider how to support and broaden global mechanisms that strengthen the incentives and capacity for intermediaries to respect internet users’ rights, particularly in the area of self-regulation.
