= Pat Kingsley =

American entertainment publicist

- Born: Patricia Ratchford; 1932 (age 93–94); Gastonia, North Carolina
- Occupation: Publicist
- Years active: 1954 - 2009
- Employer: PMK
- Spouse: Walter Kingsley (divorced)
- Children: 1

Patricia Kingsley (née Ratchford; born 1932) is a retired American publicist. A founder of PMK, she influenced the practice of celebrity PR, shaping "not only stars' images but also entertainment journalism."

Kingsley represented actors including Charlie Chaplin, Marilyn Monroe, Joan Crawford, Natalie Wood, Frank Sinatra, Robert Redford, Al Pacino, Jack Nicholson, Frank Sinatra, Jodie Foster, Lily Tomlin, Sharon Stone, Candice Bergen, Mary Tyler Moore, Sally Field, Matthew McConaughey, and Tom Cruise. She was one of the most powerful people in Hollywood at the height of her career.

== Early life and education ==
Kingsley was born in Gastonia, North Carolina in 1932. The eldest daughter of a civilian member of the United States Army Quartermaster Corps, her family moved frequently. She played basketball and softball, and was offered a contract to play in a women's softball league as a high school student. She attended Winthrop College in South Carolina for two years and then moved to Reno, where she lived with an aunt and uncle.

== Career ==
=== Fontainebleau Hotel, NBC, Rogers and Cowan ===
At 21, Kingsley moved to Miami Beach. With the help of a high school friend, she was hired to work in the publicity department of the just-opened Fountainebleau Hotel. She was primarily assigned to the television shows that broadcast live from the hotel, including The Colgate Comedy Hour. Learning "the power of the pencil," she frequently picked up bar tabs for celebrities and press people visiting the hotel.

In 1959, Kingsley moved to Los Angeles after living briefly in New York (where she worked for NBC). She was hired at the PR company Rogers & Cowan; she was co-founder Warren Cowan's secretary before she was promoted to publicist. Her first three clients were Doris Day, Natalie Wood and Samantha Eggar; she said her primary responsibility as a new publicist was to keep people away from Day. She planted stories in the press but was uncomfortable with the gossip columns of Hedda Hopper and Louella Parsons; although considered vital, she avoided their coverage.

=== Pickwick PR, PMK ===
In 1968, Kingsley married a New York-based television executive, and returned to New York. In 1969, following the birth of their daughter, she founded Pickwick Public Relations with Lois Smith, Patricia Newcomb, and Gerry Johnson. She said it was a "great time to be in the business," noting that as the studio system ended, and actors no longer worked exclusively for one studio, the PR business changed: the studios stopped handling personal PR, and the most successful actors signed with independent publicists. She moved back to Los Angeles in 1978.

In 1980, Pickwick merged with Maslansky Koenigsberg PR to become PMK. Kingsley both promoted and protected her clients; "the publicist who most embodied the role of barrier," she allowed access to her in-demand clients only if the media adhered to her terms. In 1992, she began requiring journalists to sign "consent agreements."

=== PMK/HBH Merger, Tom Cruise, retirement ===
In 2001, PMK merged with rival agency HBH to become PMK/HBH. Kingsley served as CEO. Her roster of A-list clients included Tom Cruise, who she represented from 1992 to 2004. Kingsley was often credited for Cruise's ascent to superstardom. Vanity Fair wrote that they “‘could almost finish each other's sentences.”

Cruise fired Kingsley after she advised him to stop talking about Scientology. He replaced Kingsley with his sister, Lee Anne DeVette. During the year DeVette represented him, Cruise took a "massive hit with the tabloids." He subsequently hired Amanda Lundberg, who was once part of Kingsley's team.

Kingsley stepped down from her position as PMK/HBH CEO in 2007. She continued to serve as a consultant and non-executive director for two years.

== Personal life ==
Kingsley married Walter Kingsley in 1968. They divorced 10 years later. Their daughter became a psychologist.

As a teenager in North Carolina she demonstrated against racism and campaigned for Adlai Stevenson. She is a fundraiser for the democratic party and an environmentalist.
