= Collateral censorship =

Type of censorship of speech

Collateral censorship is a type of censorship where the fear of legal liability is used to incentivize a private party who is acting as an intermediary to censor the speech of another private party. Examples of intermediaries include publishers, journalists, and online service providers. Regardless of the merits of the speech in question, holding intermediaries liable may induce them to censor a large amount of additional speech in an attempt to avoid liability. Also, an intermediary is likely to be more willing to censor than the original speaker would be, since it is not as invested in promoting the speech in question.

Collateral censorship is a justification for laws which limit the liability of intermediaries, in order to avoid the suppression of lawful speech. According to Christina Mulligan of Brooklyn Law School, "Unless intermediaries are granted near-complete immunity, the government will be able to censor authors collaterally by threatening to punish intermediaries for authors’ speech, forcing intermediaries to restrain what the government cannot directly." It has been suggested that online intermediaries are particularly vulnerable to chilling effects from collateral censorship.

== United States ==
In the United States, collateral censorship is an important concept in the case law, scholarship, and statutory interpretations of Section 230. The Supreme Court has not cited collateral censorship when deciding First Amendment cases, although it used similar logic in Smith v. California (1959), which struck down an ordinance imposing increased liability on booksellers on the grounds that it would incentivize them to censor their merchandise. In 2021, the United States Court of Appeals for the Fourth Circuit used collateral censorship as a justification in striking down a Maryland law related to online advertising.

== See also ==
- Corporate censorship
- Censorship by copyright
