= Collective work (US) =

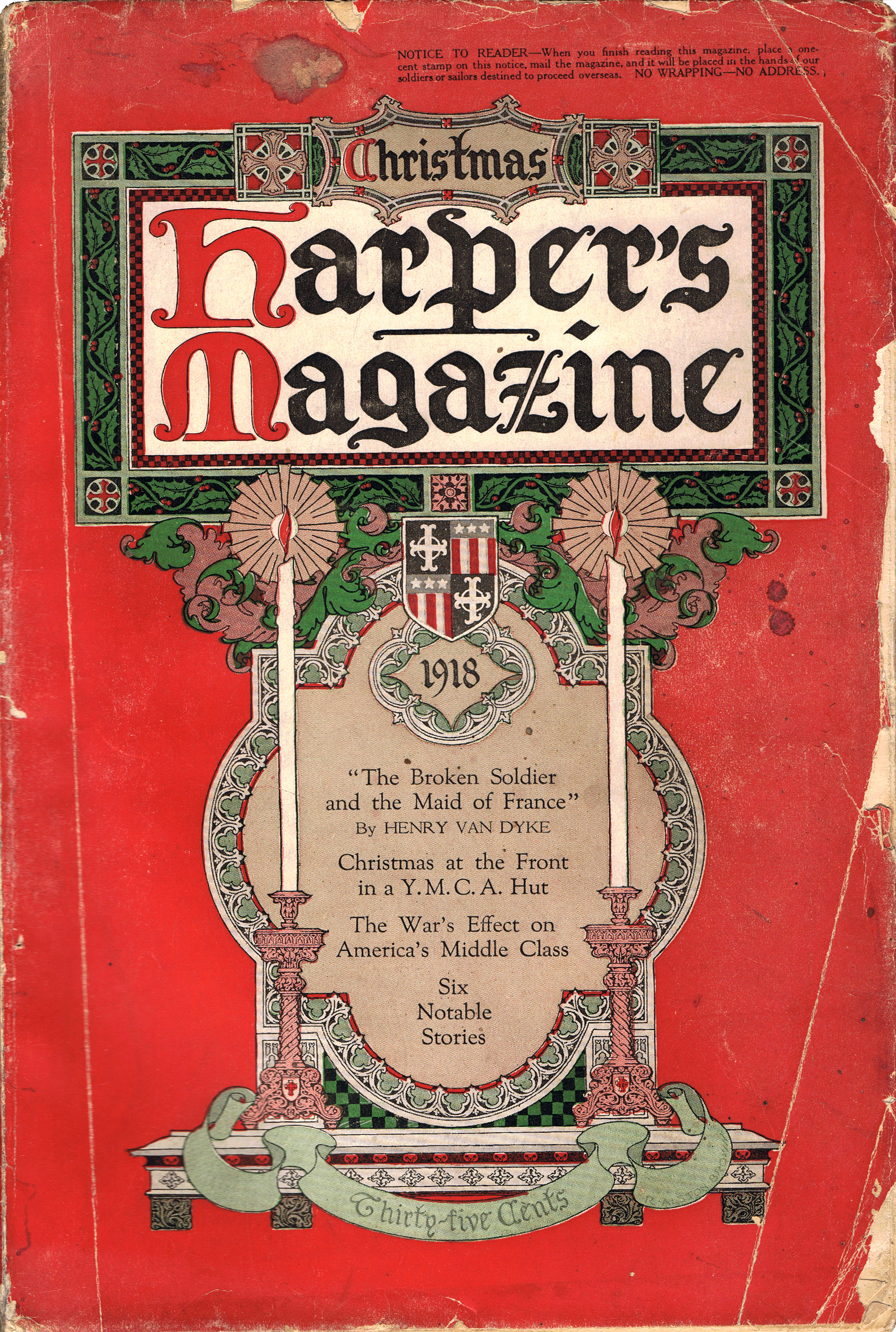
Harper's Magazine cover (1918)

A collective work in the copyright law of the United States is a work that contains the works of several authors assembled and published into a collective whole. The owner of the work has the property rights in the collective work, but the authors of the individual works may retain rights in their contributions. Electronic reproduction of the whole work is allowed, but electronic reproduction of the individual works on their own, outside the context of the work as a whole, may constitute an infringement of copyright.

== Definition ==
The Copyright Act of 1976, section 101, defines a collective work as "a work, such as a periodical issue, anthology, or encyclopedia, in which a number of contributions, constituting separate and independent works in themselves, are assembled into a collective whole". It is protected as long as the "author" can show that the selection and organization of the contributions is original, and that these contribution can themselves be protected, as opposed to being mere facts such as statistical data. The act makes a clear distinction between the collective work and the individual contributions,

Copyright in each separate contribution to a collective work is distinct from copyright in the collective work as a whole and vests initially in the author of the contribution. In the absence of an express transfer of the copyright or of any rights under it, the owner of copyright in the collective work is presumed to have acquired only the privilege of reproducing and distributing the contribution as part of that particular collective work, any revision of that collective work, and any later collective work in the same series.

The United States Copyright Office says,

A compilation or a collective work may be registered with the U.S. Copyright Office, provided that it constitutes copyrightable subject matter. As discussed in Section 307, compilations and collective works are a subset of the subject matter categories set forth in Section 102(a) of the Copyright Act, rather than separate and distinct categories of works. ... Thus, a compilation or a collective work must qualify as a literary work; a musical work; a dramatic work; a pantomime or choreographic work; a pictorial, graphic or sculptural work; a motion picture or audiovisual work; a sound recording; and/or an architectural work.

Because a collective work is a form of compilation, the U.S. Copyright Office will apply the criteria for compilations to determine whether the author’s selection, coordination, and/or arrangement satisfies the originality requirement. Thus a website will be protected only if the author used creativity or subjective judgement to select and arrange the material. Ordinarily, the Office will not examine the preexisting material that appears in a derivative work, a compilation, or a collective work to determine whether that material is protected by copyright or whether it has been used in a lawful manner.

== History ==
The first copyright law in the United States, the Copyright Act of 1790, covered maps, charts or books. The printed work was protected for 14 years from registration of its title with the district court, and could be renewed for another 14 years by the author, if still alive. It did not provide for the copyright to be vested initially in an individual or employee who ordered or commissioned a map, chart or book. The work only covered American authors, allowing publishers to flood the market with cheap reprints of British books. The first major revision was the Copyright Act of 1831, which extended the initial term to 28 years with the option to renew for another 14 years, and granted widows and children of deceased authors the right of renewal.

The Copyright Act of 1909, which became Pub. L. 60–349 on March 4, 1909, covered books, including composite and cyclopaedic works, directories, gazetteers, and other compilations; periodicals, including newspapers; and other works such as lectures, sermons, musical compositions, works of art and maps. Copyright was secured by publication with a notice of copyright. The owner was also required to deposit copies of the work with the copyright office. Copyright protection was for 28 years from date of publication, with the option to renew for a further 28 years. Copyright could be registered and renewed for a contribution to a periodical or to a cyclopaedic or other composite work. Section 6 of the act specified:

That compilations or abridgements, adaptations, arrangements, dramatizations, translations, or other versions of works in the public domain, or of copyrighted works when produced with the consent of the proprietor of the copyright in such works, or works republished with new matter, shall be regarded as new works subject to copyright under the provisions of this Act; but the publication of any such new works shall not affect the force or validity of any subsisting copyright upon the matter employed or any part thereof, or be construed to imply an exclusive right to such use of the original works, or to secure or extend copyright in such original works.

The 1909 Act was repealed and superseded by the Copyright Act of 1976, but remains effective for copyrighted works created before the Copyright Act of 1976 went into effect in 1978. The Copyright Act of 1976 created a static seventy-five-year term (dated from the date of publication) for anonymous works, pseudonymous works, and works made for hire. The extension term for works copyrighted before 1978 that had not already entered the public domain was increased from twenty-eight years to forty-seven years, giving a total term of seventy-five years. The Copyright Renewal Act of 1992 Pub. L. 102–307, 106 Stat. 264, enacted June 26, 1992 amended the 1976 Copyright Act, and affected works copyrighted between January 1, 1964 and December 31, 1977. Renewal registration for these works was made optional, and a second term was automatically secured. In 1998 the Copyright Term Extension Act further extended copyright protection to the duration of the author's life plus seventy years for general copyrights and to ninety-five years from date of publication or 120 years from date of creation, whichever comes first, for works made for hire.

== Divisibility of copyright ==
The 1909 Copyright Act was confused in its discussion of the relationship between copyright in the collective work and that in the individual works. Under the 1909 Act a copyright could only be transferred to another owner in whole, and not in part. Thus an author could not transfer the rights for their work to be published as part of a collective work without transferring all rights in their work. Goodis v. United Artists Television, Inc., 425 F.2d 397 concerned the rights of the author of the novel Dark Passage, first published as a serial in The Saturday Evening Post. The United States Court of Appeals for the Second Circuit held on 9 March 1970 that the doctrine of indivisibility could not wholly deprive an author of his copyright in a case like this.

The doctrine of indivisibility was expressly eliminated in the Copyright Act of 1976. Section 106 of the act lists the exclusive rights that the copyright owner has in a copyrighted work, which are the rights of reproduction; preparation of derivative works; distribution; public performance; public display; and digital performance in sound recordings. Each of these exclusive rights may be divided to any number of recipients, and each may be limited to a specified time or place.

== Property rights ==
The compiler, or author of the collection, owns copyright in the expression he or she contributed, which is primarily the selection and arrangement of the separate contributions, but may include such things as a preface, advertisements, etc., that the collective author created. The contributions remain the property of the authors by default, but the property may be passed to the owner of the collective work by a copyright transfer agreement. They may also obtain ownership of the contributions if they are works made for hire. The Copyright Act of 1976 says a work is considered a "work made for hire" as either,

(1) a work prepared by an employee within the scope of his or her employment; or (2) a work specially ordered or commissioned for use as a contribution to a collective work, as a part of a motion picture or other audiovisual work, as a translation, as a supplementary work, as a compilation, as an instructional text, as a test, as answer material for a test, or as an atlas, if the parties expressly agree in a written instrument signed by them that the work shall be considered a work made for hire. (17 U.S.C. § 101)

It there is no contract transferring ownership and the contributions are not work for hire, the owner has the right to reproduce, distribute and revise the collective work, but does not have the rights to the individual contributions.

== Classroom use ==
Multiple copies of works for classroom use may be made subject to conditions that include "not more than one short poem, article, story, essay, or two excerpts may be copied from the same author, not more than three from the same collective work or periodical volume during one class term.

== Websites ==
The websites of daily or weekly magazines or journal such as The New York Times or Time magazine are collective works and qualify for group registration with the Copyright Office. Electronic journals that are published one article at a time are not collective works. To defeat the "innocent infringer" rule (Note: See Online Copyright Infringement Liability Limitation Act), a collective work website must contain a copyright notice for the work as a whole. It does not need to have a copyright notice for the individual works. Advertisements are not covered by this notice, and require a separate notice to be protected. If a website contains material from the United States government, which is in the public domain, the copyright notice should indicate to readers which parts of the content are public domain and which are not. If the notice does not do so it will be found invalid, and the innocent infringer defense may be used.

Metropolitan Regional Information System, Inc. v. American Home Realty Network, Inc. [722 F.3d 591] was a United States Court of Appeals for the Fourth Circuit case in which a court held that the copyright owner of a collective work such as an automated database was not required by a pre-suit copyright registration requirement to identify names of creators and titles of individual work. Also, clicking yes to the term of use and uploading a photograph, is sufficient to writing component in assignment of right under 17 U.S.C. § 204.

== Electronic reproduction ==
The Supreme Court case of New York Times Co. v. Tasini (2001) concerned free-lance journalists who had been paid for their contributions to paper editions of newspapers and magazines, but their contracts had not covered digital rights for reproduction on CD-ROMs or publication on the Internet. When the articles were distributed in electronic form a few years later, the court ruled that this did not constitute a revision of the work, because the articles could be accessed individually. The court also discussed how the work was presented and visible to the user on the Lexis online periodical database. The databases "present articles to users clear of the context provided either by the original periodical editions or by any revision of those editions ... without the graphics, formatting, or other articles with which the article was initially published. (Note: The New York Times argued without success that it had the right to reproduce issues in Braille, in microform or translated into a foreign language, even though these versions would have a very different look and feel, so should have the right to reproduce issues electronically. The court disagreed. Another point that may be made in favor of the judgement is that the newspaper's editorials and opinion section are not shown along with the individual article, and these are essential parts of the collective work and communicate a political perspective with which the authors are associated. The authors may be instead associated in the online work with unwelcome discussion threads that cause them to lose credibility.)

In Faulkner v. National Geographic Enterprises Inc. (2005), a court of appeal ruled that an electronic version of a newspaper was a revision of the collective work if it reproduced the paper version identically, including advertisements and photographs. In the late 1990s National Geographic had begun publishing The Complete National Geographic, a digital compilation of all the past issues of the magazine. It was then sued over copyright of the magazine as a collective work in Greenberg v. National Geographic and other cases, and temporarily withdrew the availability of the compilation. On June 30, 2008, the Eleventh Circuit held that National Geographic had the right to publish faithful copies of its print magazine electronically. The ruling noted,

In the light of the Supreme Court’s holding in Tasini that the bedrock of any § 201(c) analysis is contextual fidelity to the original print publication as presented to, and perceivable by, the users of the revised version of the original publication, we agree with the Second Circuit in Faulkner and find that National Geographic is privileged to reproduce and distribute the CNG under the "revision" prong of § 201(c).

An online database that contains copyrightable works may be considered a collective work, where the owner of the database has a "thin" copyright over the selection and arrangement of the works in the database. The individual works may be covered by separate copyrights.

== Sources ==
- 425 F. 2d 397 - Goodis v. United Artists Television Inc, vol. F2d, United States Court of Appeals, Second Circuit., 9 March 1970, p. 397
- An act to amend and consolidate the acts respecting copyright (PDF), Congress, 1909
- Barrett, Margreth (19 September 2012), Emanuel Law Outlines for Intellectual Property, Wolters Kluwer Law & Business, ISBN 978-1-4548-0431-4
- Bracha, Oren (2008), L. Bently; M. Kretschmer (eds.), "Commentary on the U.S. Copyright Act 1831", Primary Sources on Copyright (1450-1900), www.copyrighthistory.org
- Bruguiere, Jean-Michel (12 May 2017), "The collective work in the American copyright and the question of its revision by the right holder", L'ACTUALITÉ DDG
- Copyrightable Authorship: What Can Be Registered (PDF), U.S. Copyright Office
- D'Agostino, Giuseppina (1 January 2010), Copyright, Contracts, Creators: New Media, New Rules, Edward Elgar Publishing, ISBN 978-1-84980-520-9
- Fishman, Stephen, J.D (26 October 2007), Legal Guide to Web & Software Development, Nolo, ISBN 978-1-4133-1516-5
- Fountain, Jennifer L., "Indivisibility and Divisibility of Copyright: Copyright Act of 1909 and 1976", Findlaw
- Greenberg v. National Geographic Society 533 F.3d 1244 (PDF), 11th Circuit, 2008
- DeGeeter, Melvin Joseph (2004), Technology Commercialization Manual: Strategy, Tactics, and Economics for Business Success, Med-Launch, Inc., ISBN 978-1-58961-162-7
- Leaffer, Marshall A. (18 May 2010), Understanding Copyright Law, LexisNexis, ISBN 978-1-4224-8636-8
- McJohn, Stephen M. (2006), Copyright: Examples and Explanations, Aspen Publishers Online, ISBN 978-0-7355-5287-6
- Metro. Reg'l Info. Sys., Inc. v. Am. Home Realty Network, Inc. 722 F.3d 591
- Patry, William F. (1994), "1 – Introduction: The First Copyright Act", Copyright Law and Practice, The Bureau of National Affairs, Inc.
- Works Made for Hire (PDF), United States Copyright Office
