= Howard Coble =

American politician (1931–2015)

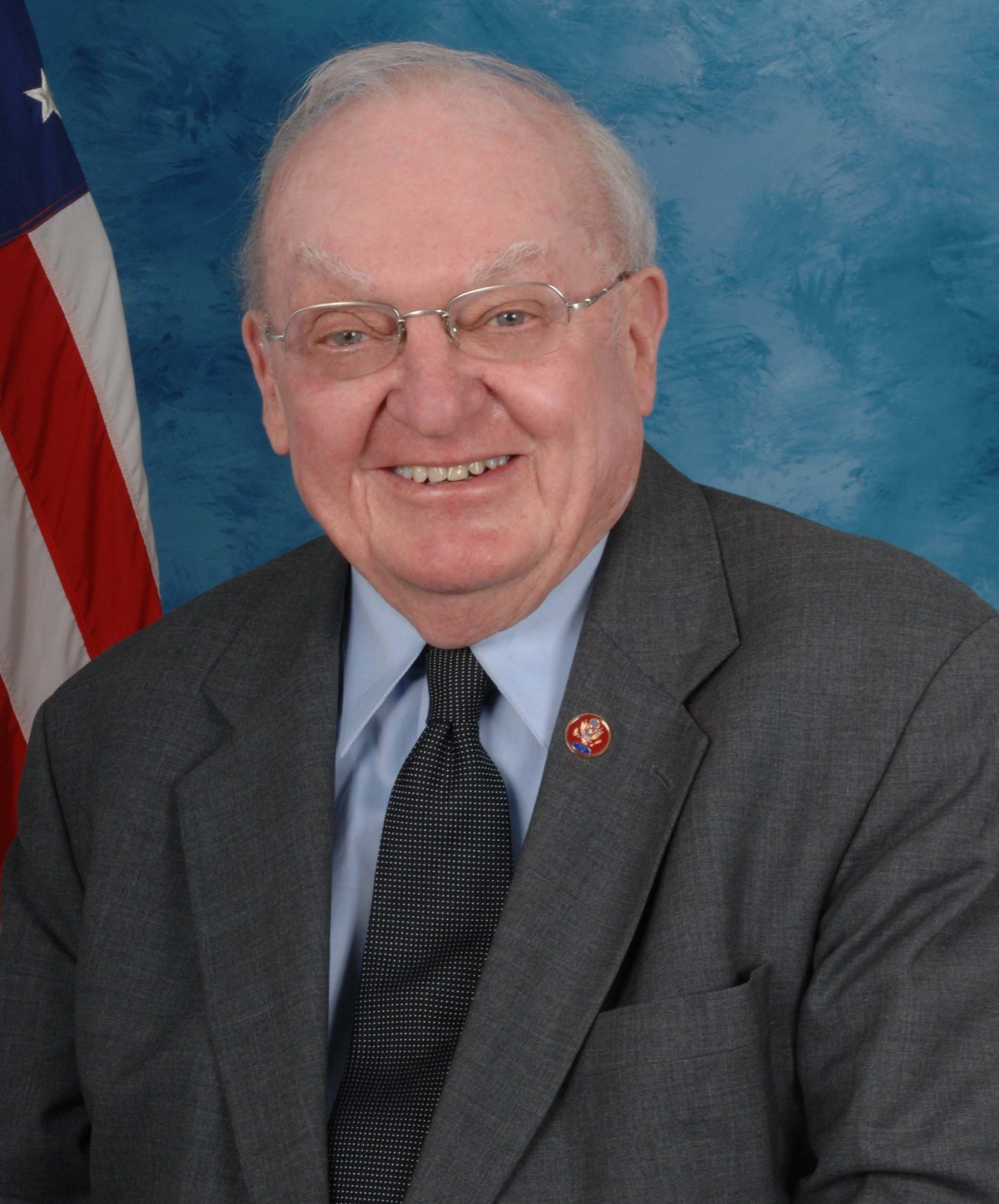

Member of the U.S. House of Representatives from North Carolina's 6th district
- In office January 3, 1985 – January 3, 2015
- Preceded by: Robin Britt
- Succeeded by: Mark Walker

Member of the North Carolina House of Representatives from the 27th district
- In office 1983–1985
- Preceded by: Thomas Bell Hunter
- Succeeded by: Albert S. Lineberry; Frank Julian Sizemore, III

Member of the North Carolina House of Representatives from the 23rd district
- In office 1979–1983
- Preceded by: Henry E. Frye; Thomas Odell Gilmore; Thomas B. Sawyer; William Marcus Short; Charles Edward Webb
- Succeeded by: George W. Miller Jr. William Paul Pulley, Jr. Kenneth Bridgeforth Spaulding

Secretary of the North Carolina Department of Revenue
- In office 1973–1977
- Governor: James Holshouser
- Preceded by: Gilmer Andrew Jones, Jr.
- Succeeded by: Mark G. Lynch

Member of the North Carolina House of Representatives from the 26th district
- In office 1969–1971
- Preceded by: Hargrove Skipper Bowles, Jr. Elton Edwards; James Gooden Exum, Jr. Charles Wesley Phillips; Daniel P. Whitley, Jr.
- Succeeded by: Clifton Tredway Hunt, Jr. John McNeill Smith, Jr.

Personal details
- Born: John Howard Coble; March 18, 1931 Greensboro, North Carolina, U.S.
- Died: November 3, 2015 (aged 84) Greensboro, North Carolina, U.S.
- Party: Republican
- Education: Appalachian State University; Guilford College (AB); University of North Carolina, Chapel Hill (JD)
- Occupation: Lawyer

Military service
- Branch/service: United States Coast Guard
- Years of service: 1952–1956; 1977–1978; 1960–1982 (USCGR)
- Rank: Captain
- Battles/wars: Korean War
- Howard Coble's voice Coble speaks in support of the Digital Millennium Copyright Act, which he sponsored Recorded August 4, 1998

John Howard Coble (March 18, 1931 – November 3, 2015) was an American politician who was the U.S. representative for North Carolina's 6th congressional district, serving from 1985 to 2015. He was a member of the Republican Party. The district includes all or portions of ten counties in the northern-central part of the state, including portions of Greensboro and Durham.

== Early life, education, and pre-political career ==
Coble was born in Greensboro, North Carolina, the son of Johnnie E. (Holt) and Joseph Howard Coble. After high school, he initially attended Appalachian State University, but after a year joined the United States Coast Guard, serving for over 5 years and staying on as a reservist for an additional 18 years. Upon discharging from military service, he attended Guilford College, from which he received a history degree. He was a member of the Epsilon Iota chapter of Pi Kappa Phi fraternity at the University of North Carolina at Greensboro. Coble then moved on to the University of North Carolina at Chapel Hill and earned a degree in law.

After graduating from college, Coble first worked as an insurance agent. He then spent nearly 20 years as a practicing attorney, and he was also Secretary of Revenue under North Carolina Governor James Holshouser. In 1979, Coble was elected to the North Carolina House of Representatives, serving until his election to Congress.

== U.S. House of Representatives ==
=== Elections ===
Coble was first elected to Congress in 1984, narrowly defeating Walter Cockerham in the primary 51%–49%. In the general election, he defeated one-term Democratic incumbent Robin Britt 51%–49%. Coble was likely the beneficiary of long coattails from Ronald Reagan, who carried the district by a nearly 2-to-1 margin. In 1986, he defeated Britt in a rematch, which was an even closer 50.03%–49.97% and Coble won by only 79 votes (closest margin of victory that year). He would never face another contest nearly that close, and would be reelected 13 more times with 61% or more of the vote. In July 2008, Coble won the Republican primary unopposed and became North Carolina's longest-serving Republican U.S. congressman, surpassing former U.S. Congressman Jim Broyhill (who was also elected to 12 terms but left the House in July 1986 to fill a vacant U.S. Senate seat). Coble announced in 2013 that he would not run for another term in 2014, and would retire after 30 years in Congress.

=== Tenure ===
In the 105th United States Congress Coble moved to suspend the rules and pass the NET Act on November 4, 1997, which removed the requirement of financial gain for criminal prosecution of copyright violation. The NET Act was passed only after the House suspended the rules.

Coble was a strong supporter of agriculture and had voted in favor of bills to protect agriculture. Coble opposed further regulation of tobacco because he believed it would hurt North Carolina tobacco planters.

Coble took a hard-line position on illegal drugs, and co-sponsored a resolution to oppose the legalization and use of medical marijuana. He also voted for an amendment to authorize drug testing on federal employees. However, he authored a resolution to celebrate the passage of the Twenty-first Amendment, which repealed the Prohibition of alcoholic beverages in the United States. Coble was also a member of the Tea Party Caucus, joining Sue Myrick and Walter B. Jones as the sole members of the North Carolina Congressional delegation to join the group.

In June 2013, Coble announced introduction of new legislation to reform the congressional pension program. He stated that reforming congressional pensions was long overdue and that the bill would lengthen the time of service required before a member would be eligible for participation in the pension program. Coble himself pledged not to receive any pension from the United States government. He told CBS Up to the Minute, "I figured taxpayers pay my salary – not a bad salary, and I figure that's sufficient. Let me fend for myself after the salary's collected." He also stated to CBS, "I've pledged my assurance I won't take the pension. That's between my constituents and me. As far as convicted felons, I guess that's between their constituents and themselves." He was one of two congressmen, with Ron Paul, to have pledged to decline his pension.

However, during the government shutdown in October 2013, Coble said that although 800,000 federal workers are furloughed and not receiving a paycheck, he would still collect his salary as a requirement of law. Coble was one of 87 Republicans who voted to end the shutdown.

=== Legislation sponsored ===
A bill to extend the Undetectable Firearms Act of 1988 for 10 years (H.R. 3626; 113th Congress) was introduced in the House on December 2, 2013, by Coble. The bill would extend the Act but would not expand any of its provisions (related to plastic guns). It passed the House on December 3, 2013.

Coble also sponsored the Digital Millennium Copyright Act (DMCA), in 1997, a bill fundamental to the foundation of internet law. It would come into effect in the year 2000.

In addition, Coble sponsored the Work Made for Hire and Copyright Corrections Act of 2000, which excluded sound recordings from being considered works made for hire under U.S. copyright law. That provision consequently enabled recording artists to terminate copyright transfer agreements after 35 years.

=== Committee assignments ===
- Committee on the Judiciary
  - Subcommittee on Courts, Commercial and Administrative Law (Chair)
  - Subcommittee on Intellectual Property, Competition, and the Internet
- Committee on Transportation and Infrastructure
  - Subcommittee on Aviation
  - Subcommittee on Coast Guard and Maritime Transportation
  - Subcommittee on Highways and Transit

=== Caucus memberships ===
- Congressional Fire Services Caucus
- Congressional Caucus on Turkey and Turkish Americans
- International Conservation Caucus
- Republican Study Committee
- Sportsmen's Caucus
- Tea Party Caucus

== Personal life ==
As a young man, Coble frequently enjoyed eating a breakfast of Rose brand pork brains in milk gravy and eggs. According to a quote from Coble appearing alongside his family recipe for "Breakfast Brains N' Eggs," the breakfast was "fairly regular" and "not at all unusual".

Coble was a member of the Guilford College Board of Visitors and of the U.S. Coast Guard Academy Board of Visitors.

He was a Freemason and member of Guilford Lodge number 656 in Greensboro.

Coble had skin cancer for many years among other ailments. He was admitted to intensive care in a Greensboro hospital in September 2015 after complications from skin cancer surgery, and died in the hospital from those complications on November 3, 2015, at age 84.

== Electoral history ==
North Carolina's 6th congressional district: Results 1984–2012
| Year | Republican | Votes | % | Democratic | Votes | % | Third Party | Party | Votes | % | Third Party | Party | Votes | % |
|---|---|---|---|---|---|---|---|---|---|---|---|---|---|---|
| 1984 | Howard Coble | 102,925 | 51% | Robin Britt | 100,263 | 49% | | | | | | | | |
| 1986 | Howard Coble | 72,329 | 50% | Robin Britt | 72,250 | 50% | | | | | | | | |
| 1988 | Howard Coble | 116,534 | 62% | Tom Gilmore | 70,008 | 38% | | | | | | | | |
| 1990 | Howard Coble | 125,392 | 67% | Helen Allegrone | 62,913 | 33% | | | | | | | | |
| 1992 | Howard Coble | 162,822 | 71% | Robin Hood | 67,200 | 29% | | | | | | | | |
| 1994 | Howard Coble | 98,355 | 100% | No candidate | | | | | | | | | | |
| 1996 | Howard Coble | 167,828 | 73% | Mark Costley | 58,022 | 25% | Gary Goodson | Libertarian | 2,693 | 1% | | | | |
| 1998 | Howard Coble | 112,740 | 89% | No candidate | | | Jeffrey Bentley | Libertarian | 14,454 | 11% | | | | |
| 2000 | Howard Coble | 195,727 | 91% | No candidate | | | Jeffrey Bentley | Libertarian | 18,726 | 9% | | | | |
| 2002 | Howard Coble | 151,430 | 90% | No candidate | | | Tara Grubb | Libertarian | 16,067 | 10% | | | | |
| 2004 | Howard Coble | 207,470 | 73% | William Jordan | 76,153 | 27% | | | | | | | | |
| 2006 | Howard Coble | 108,433 | 71% | Rory Blake | 44,661 | 29% | | | | | | | | |
| 2008 | Howard Coble | 221,008 | 67% | Teresa Bratton | 108,873 | 33% | | | | | | | | |
| 2010 | Howard Coble | 156,252 | 75% | Sam Turner | 51,507 | 25% | | | | | | | | |
| 2012 | Howard Coble | 222,116 | 61% | Tony Foriest | 142,467 | 39% | Hugh Chauvin | Libertarian | 4,847 | 2% | Brandon Parmer | Green | 2,017 | 1% |

Party political offices
| Preceded by Theodore C. Conrad | Republican nominee for North Carolina State Treasurer; 1976 | Vacant Title next held by Nancy L. Coward |
U.S. House of Representatives
| Preceded by Robin Britt | Member of the U.S. House of Representatives from North Carolina's 6th congressional district 1985–2015 | Succeeded by Mark Walker |
