= Loan-out corporation =

Type of US business entity

A loan-out corporation, also known as a loan-out company, or personal service corporation, is a form of US business entity in which the creator is an 'employee' whose services are loaned out by the corporate body. The creator of the corporation is typically the sole shareholder, and thus the corporation is used as a means to reduce their personal liability, protect their assets and exploit taxation advantages. Loan-out corporations are especially prominent in the entertainment and professional sports industries, as the creator's services are typically performed on individual contract basis, and receive large, irregular sums of income throughout the year.

The corporate body is engaged by external third parties to fulfill services, rather than the individual directly. Consequently, it is the creator's loan-out corporation that is referred to and liable in contracts to perform the services required.

== History ==
The OECD Model Income Tax treaty of 1930, lies as the foundation by which loan-out corporation structures may be used. Under Article 17, the model outlines the manner in which athletes, celebrities, or artists operating across numerous countries, and therefore earning income under numerous taxation systems, may only be taxed in their home jurisdiction's source of income, even without an established corporate body. This rationale was initiated due to the difficulties of taxing individuals who operate on numerous contracts, such as professional sportspeople or artists.

Major changes have come into effect as of 2017, increasing the benefits and incentivizing the exploitation of the loan-out corporation structure. The predominant change that has come into place through the passing of the Tax Cuts and Jobs Act 2017 lies in end of the itemized tax deduction for unreimbursed employee expenses. The consequence of this legislation is that all individuals representing themselves, operating on a contract-by-contract basis, will be able to deduct almost all reasonable, business related expenses from their taxable income whilst operating under the loan-out corporate body. This legislation has sparked a rejuvenation of the concept of operating under a corporate body, which facilitates all payments, with the individual creator of the corporation loaning out their services, while allowing for expense deduction and asset protection.

== Benefits ==
When a corporation loans out the services of an individual, the borrowing party pays a contractual amount for the services, and therefore pays a salary to the individual performing the services, via the corporation. The borrowing entity may pay a token dividend or provide additional fringe benefits to cover insurances, medical, or retirement plans. An effective use of the corporation status over that of an individual employment contract, may minimise the corporation's taxable income to near zero, even in the case of a C corporation. The key benefits of creating a loan-out corporation business entity are expense deductions, asset protection and tax deferral.

=== Expense deductions ===
The loan-out corporation is considered a separate tax entity to that of the creator, and thus, the creator may take advantage on the minimization of taxable income, through tax-deductible expenses. The creator's business expenses may be processed through the loan-out corporation, so treated as corporate expenses rather than personal employee expenses. This entitles the creator to deduct more expenses than otherwise applicable. Prior to the introduction of the new Tax Cuts and Jobs Act, employees were only able to deduct their unreimbursed business expenses up to a value of 2% of their gross income. But under the new legislation, employees are no longer able to deduct unreimbursed business expenses at all. Consequently, there is no limit to the value of corporate expense deductions, and can therefore deduct almost all reasonable business expenses, and thus minimize their taxation liability.

=== Asset protection ===
Limited liability companies (LLC) offer personal liability protection, ensuring that a financial loss or incident that occurs to the corporation does not impact shareholder's own finances or assets. The loan-out corporate structure is therefore ideal as it forms a separate legal entity to the creator, and thus the creator is not liable for external claims against the corporation's assets in the event of a legal dispute, or the repayment of debt. That is, if the company is sued or required to pay substantial debt that it is unable to honour, the assets of the creator are not subject to liquidation; Only the corporate body's asset's are liable.

=== Tax deferral ===
Loan-out corporations are able to defer their taxable income to the following taxable year. This is a result of the corporation being able to select its taxable year of income, from any fiscal year. However, the loan-out corporation must select a fiscal year that ends between September and December. The advantage of this, is that the creator of the corporation may use a fiscal year that ends earlier than that of the U.S. Personal income tax period, which ends December 31. The corporation must pay its shareholder(s) compensation as bonuses equal to or less than the payment made in the prior tax year, or 95% of the corporations taxable income earned in the taxable year ended December 31. Consequently, a loan-out corporation experiencing increasing revenues will benefit from the use of fiscal year tax deferral.

== Common law ==
=== Section 269A of the Internal Revenue Code: Personal service corporations formed or availed of to avoid or evade income tax ===
Section 269A of the Internal Revenue Code defines the conditions upon which the creator's of a loan-out corporation body must satisfy, for the official recognition of a loan-out corporation business entity structure. The corporate structure must satisfy the following two conditions to render the entity as an official loan-out corporate structure:

1. "Substantially all of the services of a personal service corporation are performed for (or on behalf of) 1 other corporation, partnership, or other entity, and"
2. "the principal purpose for forming, or availing of, such personal service corporation is the avoidance or evasion of Federal income tax by reducing the income of, or securing the benefit of any expense, deduction, credit, exclusion, or other allowance for, any employee-owner which would not otherwise be available," "then the Secretary may allocate all income, deductions, credits, exclusions, and other allowances between such personal service corporation and its employee-owners, if such allocation is necessary to prevent avoidance or evasion of Federal income tax or clearly to reflect the income of the personal service corporation or any of its employee-owners."

In the given context, employee-owner refers to an employee of the company that at any given point in time, holds greater than 10% of the loan-out corporation's outstanding stock.

Therefore, it is essential for the potential creators of loan-out corporations, to ensure that all services performed are on behalf of the loan-out corporation, purely as a means for avoiding U.S. federal taxation.

=== Section 482 of the Internal Revenue Code: Reallocation of Income ===
Section 482 of the Internal Revenue Code allows for a reallocation of income from the loan-out corporation to the individual, if necessary to avoid unintended tax evasion, or to more reasonably reflect the genuine revenues generated by the corporation.

In the case of athletes, their services or talents are considered to be a business in their own right, and the sportsperson may therefore be recognised as multiple operating entities. This can be avoided by athletes if they only perform services through the loan-out corporation, not forming additional contracts with other external parties for their athletic services.

== Drawbacks for creators ==
Although loan-out corporations are typically established to exploit taxation benefits and asset protection, there is risk associated with the poor formation and management of loan-out corporations. Poor management of the loan-out corporate structure, may result in the costs of incorporation exceeding the benefits received through the separation of legal entity between the creator and the corporate structure.

=== Double taxation ===
In a general corporate setting, the corporation pays tax on profits made from generating business revenues, and pays out a dividend to shareholders. Subsequently, these shareholders pay tax on the income received in the form of dividend. However, in the loan-out corporation format, the creator of the corporation is typically the sole shareholder. To avoid paying tax twice, at the corporate and personal income tax levels, the loan-out corporation will pay out its profits to the sole shareholder as a salary or bonus. Since the payment is treated as a salary expense, it is tax deductible as it is a typical part of business operations, rather than the elective payment of a dividend, minimising company profit to or near zero.

=== Unreasonable compensation ===
Employers may be denied a tax deduction on salaries, if the compensation paid to the sole shareholder is seen as unreasonable. The 'reasonable' level of compensation faces scrutiny and controversy, as there is no definitive or quantitative measurement of what is, or is not reasonable. Consequently, the only bases for comparison are other incomes seen in the industry, on similar circumstances. As a result, if a portion of the payable salary is denied, due to being deemed as unreasonable and objectionable, both the corporation, and the creator, will be subject to taxation.

=== Copyright termination ===
The U.S. Constitution, Article 1, Section 8, ensures the progression of artistic, and scientific endeavours by instilling a time limit for exclusive rights on works created. The currently standing Copyright Act of 1976, permits that all works created after January 1, 1978, endures exclusive copyright protection from creation, to 70 years after the original author, or creator of the work passes. However, section 201(b) clearly identifies that copyright ownership becomes void for works made for hire. Consequently, the entity receiving the work, (e.g. the producing or directing company of a film, rather than the actor loaning their services), is deemed the author of the work, and thus the exclusive owner of all the copyright, negating the creator of the loan-out corporation exclusive rights to their own work.

== Complications for non-U.S. residents ==
Nonresidents are subject to U.S. taxation to the extent of the services that they perform within the United States, whereas U.S. residents are subject to U.S. taxation for the gross income they receive globally. The determination of whether an individual is a permanent or predominate resident of the United States and thus classified under the United States taxation requirements is essential in planning for tax minimisation advantages. This residency is an essential establishment as corporate entities not deemed to have permanent establishment in the United States, may be eligible to apply taxation treaty provisions existing between their primary nation of residence and the U.S., and thus avoid double taxation on income received via the loan-out corporate entity.

This difficulty is often faced by athletes performing in the major U.S. sporting codes such as the NBA, NFL, and NHL, as athletes living globally are involved, and teams compete across Canada and the U.S. This is especially prominent as athletes often compete in the U.S., or Canada for a period of 8 months or more, and therefore determining the athletes primary country of residence and therefore their corporate tax liability.
