= Work Made for Hire and Copyright Corrections Act of 2000 =

U.S. federal statute passed by the 106th United States Congress

- Long title: An Act to make certain corrections in copyright law.
- Enacted by: the 106th United States Congress
- Effective: October 27, 2000 (partially retrospective to November 29, 1999)

Citations
- Public law: Pub. L. 106–379 (text) (PDF)

Codification
- Acts amended: Copyright Act of 1976
- Titles amended: 17
- U.S.C. sections amended: 17 U.S.C. ch. 1 (§§ 101, 121(a)) 17 U.S.C. ch. 7 (§§ 705(a), 708(a)–(b), 710)

Legislative history
- Introduced in the House of Representatives as H.R. 5107 by Howard Coble (R‑NC) on September 6, 2000; Passed the House of Representatives on September 19, 2000 (voice vote); Passed the Senate on October 12, 2000 (unanimous consent); Signed into law by President Bill Clinton on October 27, 2000

The Work Made for Hire and Copyright Corrections Act of 2000 is a U.S. federal statute passed by the 106th United States Congress primarily redefining which works can be considered works for hire under U.S. copyright law. It also clarifies the recordkeeping duties of the Register of Copyrights and authorized fees of the United States Copyright Office. The law removes sound recordings as being considered works for hire as a standalone category, even if a rights holder agrees that their work will be for hire in a contract, but leaves ambiguous whether they could qualify as works for hire through other means. The law was primarily a reaction to a 1999 law that rendered sound recordings as eligible works for hire on their own.

The law is significant because it enables sound recording artists to reclaim transfers of their copyright after 35 years have passed under existing provisions in the Copyright Act of 1976, a right which is not available to works for hire. The position of the Recording Industry Association of America (RIAA) with regard to the law and the prior 1999 amendments is debated. Shortly after the 1999 changes were adopted, the RIAA had hired a legislative counsel who may have helped draft them, but the law was eventually supported by RIAA, the National Academy of Recording Arts & Sciences, and other recording industry groups.

== Background ==
=== Status of sound recordings pre-1999 ===
Under U.S. copyright law, works for hire are considered the intellectual property of the employer and not the creator. However, at the time the Copyright Act of 1976 was enacted, works for hire were restricted to an enumeration of certain categories—works made during the course of employment, contributions to a collective work, parts of a motion picture or other audiovisual work, translations, supplementary works, compilations, instructional texts, answer materials for tests, and atlases. Notably, sound recordings were excluded from the definition of works for hire.

The exclusion of sound recordings as works for hire was intended to balance the rights of creators and employers. Federal courts had repeatedly affirmed that sound recordings were excluded from the enumeration of eligible works for hire, with all three cases arising before 1999 ruling in favor of their exclusion. Only one case ever reached a Court of Appeals for a precedential ruling. In 1997, the United States Court of Appeals for the Fifth Circuit ruled in Lulirama Ltd v. Axcess Broadcast Services, Inc. that while audiovisual works may be considered works for hire, they must have a visual component and pure sound recordings were excluded.

=== Transfer termination right ===
The definition of works for hire primarily had importance in the termination of copyright transfers. Section 203 of the Copyright Act of 1976 allows rights holders to terminate transfer agreements after 35 years for all works except works for hire. This right cannot be waived by contract. The origin of this right, as noted by the House Committee on the Judiciary, was based in the "unequal bargaining position of authors" and the inability to determine the worth of a work "until it has been exploited." Because of the 35-year waiting period and the two-year post-notification waiting period, the first terminations could not be executed until 2013.

=== 1999 amendments ===
==== Definitional changes ====
On November 29, 1999, the Intellectual Property and Communications Omnibus Reform Act of 1999 was enacted as Appendix I of the Consolidated Appropriations Act, 2000. That law amended the Copyright Act of 1976 to include sound recordings in the enumeration of eligible works for hire.

==== Accusations of RIAA support ====
Mike Greene, then-president of the National Academy of Recording Arts and Sciences (NARAS), accused the RIAA of having influenced the passage of the 1999 changes by hiring legislative counsel associated with the drafting of the 1999 law. Greene stressed that the 1999 law was not merely a procedural change, but rather a substantive one that was not in line with standard industry practice. The accusations were supported by the RIAA's hiring of Mitch Glazier, the chief counsel of the intellectual property subcommittee within the House Committee on the Judiciary, as a lobbyist three months after the 1999 changes were added into the Consolidated Appropriations Act, 2000. A Billboard report in January 2000 also revealed that the 1999 redefinition was suggested by a staffer at the request of the RIAA.

RIAA denied having ever supported the Intellectual Property and Communications Omnibus Reform Act of 1999 and stated that any changes were only technical amendments that reflected the industry standard, yet Register of Copyrights Marybeth Peters stated that the amendment was substantive. On August 8, 2000, RIAA, NARAS, and other recording industry groups released a joint statement supporting the exclusion of sound recordings from eligible works for hire.

== Provisions ==
=== Redefinition of works for hire ===
==== Exclusion of sound recordings from eligibility ====
Sound recordings were excluded from being a standalone category of works for hire, restoring the definition of works for hire to the original enumeration under the Copyright Act of 1976. However, the law left ambiguous whether they could qualify as works for hire through the other categories.

==== Retrospectivity ====
The redefinition of works for hire was given retrospective effect from November 29, 1999, the date of enactment of the Intellectual Property and Communications Omnibus Reform Act of 1999, which had added sound recordings as eligible works for hire.

==== Mandated judicial nonconsideration of amendments ====
In cases arising under a dispute of whether a work should be considered a work for hire, courts could not consider the fact that the Intellectual Property and Communications Omnibus Reform Act of 1999 was enacted and later had its works for hire redefinition provision effectively repealed as a statement of legislative intent.

=== Register of Copyrights recordkeeping responsibilities ===
The Register of Copyrights was required to keep records of "deposits, registrations, recordations, and other actions taken" under the Copyright Act of 1976.

=== Changes to fees ===
The Register of Copyrights was authorized to charge fees for the following categories:

1. Filing of a copyright claim;
2. Filing of a renewal of a subsisting copyright claim;
3. Issuance of a receipt for a deposit;
4. Recording a transfer of copyright ownership;
5. Filing of a notice of intention to obtain a compulsory license;
6. Recording a statement revealing the identity of an anonymous or pseudonymous work or relating to the death of an author;
7. Issuance of an additional certificate of registration;
8. Issuance of any other certification; and
9. Making and reporting of a search, and for any related services.

== Legislative history ==
=== House of Representatives ===
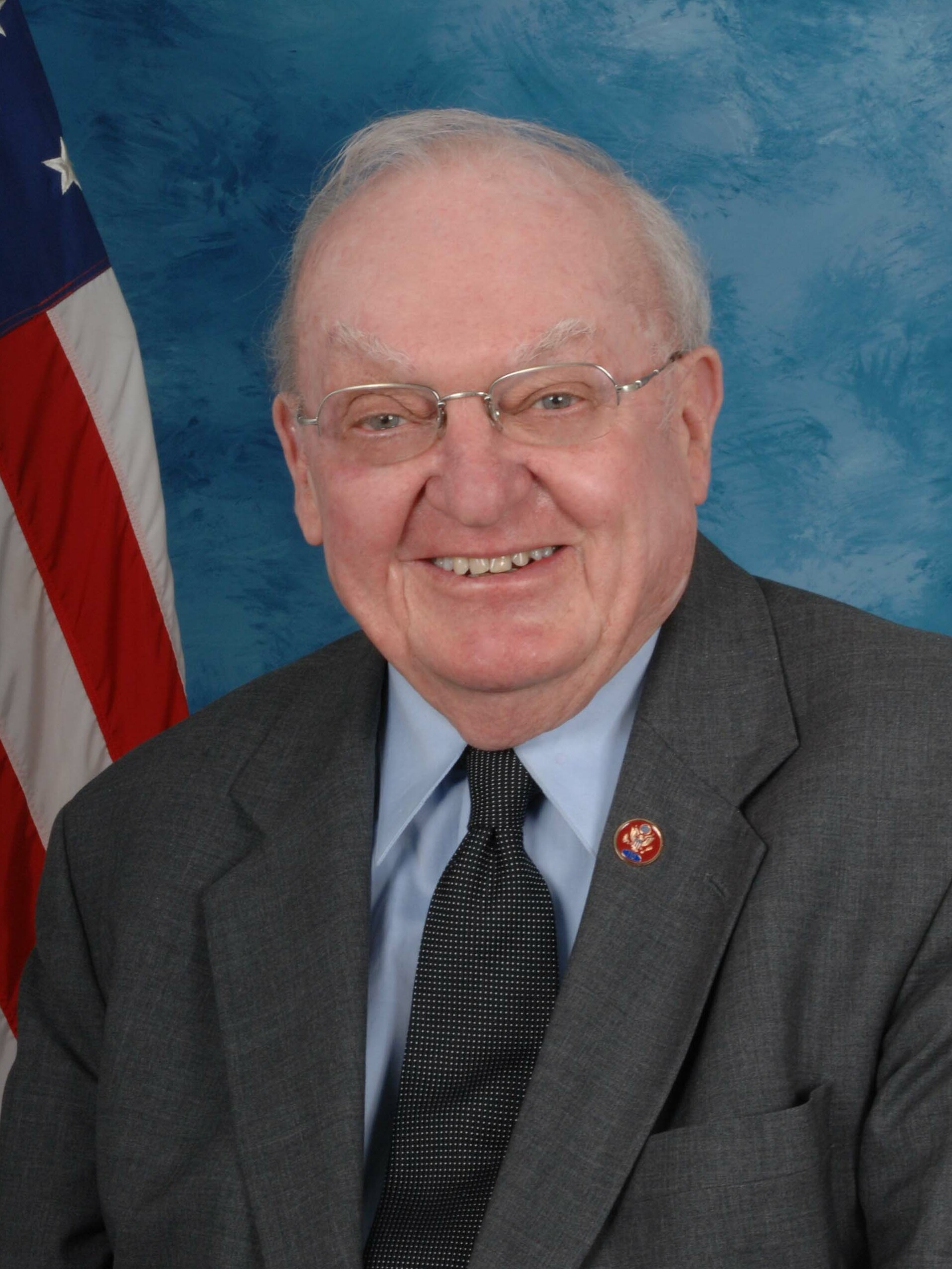
Howard Coble (R‑NC) introduced the bill in the House of Representatives.

Howard Coble, a Republican from North Carolina's 6th congressional district, introduced the bill on September 6, 2000, and a motion to suspend the rules and pass the bill was agreed to by voice vote on September 19, 2000.

==== Testimony of the Register of Copyrights ====
Register of Copyrights Marybeth Peters gave testimony to the House Committee on the Judiciary on May 25, 2000 relating to sound recordings and works made for hire shortly before the September introduction of the bill. Peters criticized the 1999 amendments as violating the "basic principle" of copyright law that artists should have the right to terminate copyright transfers. However, she acknowledged the fact that excessive terminations may impair the ability of record labels to profit from the recording, especially on recordings authored by multiple individuals. She proposed a compromise where sound recordings would be included in the list of eligible works for hire, yet key contributors to a recording would retain the right to terminate while lesser contributors would not.

=== Senate ===
On October 12, 2000, the Senate passed the bill without amendment by unanimous consent.

=== Enactment ===
President Bill Clinton signed the law on October 27, 2000.

== Impact ==
=== Recording artists' rights ===
The law enabled recording artists to terminate transfers of copyright over their recordings. Notable examples of artists exercising this right include John Waite and Joe Ely, who successfully terminated their copyright transfers to Capitol Records after a legal battle. While record labels may still include contractual clauses defining an artist's recordings as works for hire, the law renders these clauses generally unenforceable.

=== Legal landscape ===
While the law excluded sound recordings on their own from constituting works for hire, it left ambiguous whether they could qualify under another category enumerated as an eligible work for hire. Litigation has ensued over the treatment of recording artists as employees, and thus their works as works for hire, or as contributors to collective works. In an opinion issued by the United States District Court for the Southern District of New York relating to Waite and Ely's termination case, District Judge Lewis A. Kaplan remarked that the determination of recording artists as employees is highly dependent on the facts of the case and is unique to each artist. Nevertheless, there has not yet been a precedential ruling from a Court of Appeals or the Supreme Court of the United States on the issue of whether sound recordings can qualify as works for hire under another category of the definition.
