= Diversey v. Schmidly =

Diversey v. Schmidly, 738 F. 3d 1196 (10th Cir. 2013) is an American federal copyright case from the United States Court of Appeals for the Tenth Circuit. The case addresses several important issues in U.S. copyright law, including the three-year statute of limitations, the making available right, the doctrine of fair use, and contributory infringement.

Diversey v. Schmidly is the first U.S. copyright case to explicitly recognize a making available right under § 106(3) of the Copyright Act by having relied on the proposition from Nimmer on Copyright that "[n]o consummated act of actual distribution need be demonstrated... to implicate the copyright owner's distribution right".

In "The Tenth Circuit Discovers Copyright’s Lost Ark: Section 106(3) Encompasses a 'Making Available' Right", Professor Peter Menell of the UC Berkeley School of Law wrote:

"[T]he Diversey case squarely holds that making a copyrighted work available to the public without authorization violates Section 106(3) of the Copyright Act. Hence, no proof of actual receipt by the public is required. Although the Diversey case did not involve Internet file-sharing, its invocation of the legislative history underlying the distribution right would apply equally to file-sharing cases. Furthermore, the court’s conception of “lending” a copy also supports a broad understanding of the distribution right."
