= Work for hire =

Concept in copyright law

In copyright law, a work made for hire (work for hire or WFH) is a work whose copyright is initially owned by an entity other than the actual creator as a result of an employment relationship or, in some cases, a commission. It is an exception to the general rule that the person who actually creates a work is the legally-recognized author of that work.

In the United States, United Kingdom, and several other jurisdictions, if a work is created by an employee as part of their job duties, the employer is considered the legal author or first owner of copyright. In some countries, this is known as corporate authorship. The entity serving as an employer may be a corporation or other legal entity, an organization, or an individual.

The work for hire doctrine originated in United States copyright law, but other countries have adopted similar legal principles. In the jurisprudence of the United Kingdom and India, the hiring party is referred to as the first owner of copyright.

== In the United States ==
=== Definition ===
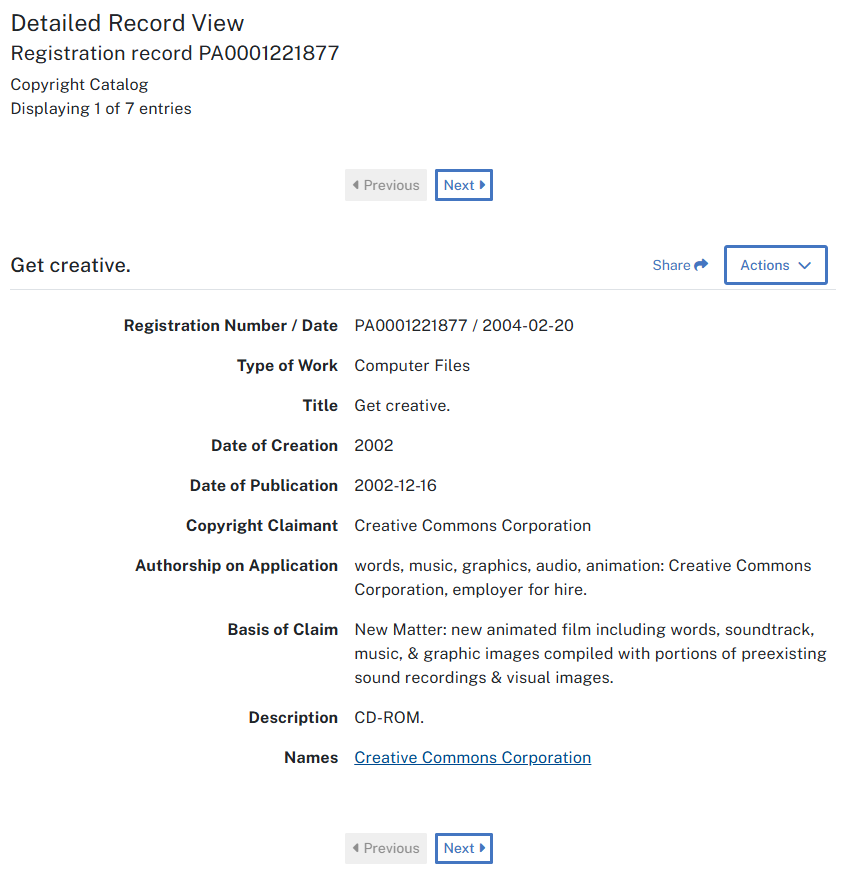
U.S. copyright registration identifying "Creative Commons Corporation, employer for hire" as the author of a work

Since the passage of the Copyright Act of 1976, a "work made for hire" has been defined in the copyright statute as either:

(1) a work prepared by an employee within the scope of his or her employment; or

(2) a work specially ordered or commissioned for use as a contribution to a collective work, as a part of a motion picture or other audiovisual work, as a translation, as a supplementary work, as a compilation, as an instructional text, as a test, as answer material for a test, or as an atlas, if the parties expressly agree in a written instrument signed by them that the work shall be considered a work made for hire.

— 17 U.S.C. § 101

The United States Copyright Office refers to the person or entity for whom the work is created as the hiring party. On copyright registrations, the hiring party may be referred to as an "employer for hire".

Although the work for hire doctrine allows an artificial person such as a company to be identified as the statutory "author" of a work, the Copyright Office has clarified that the doctrine presupposes that the work was actually created by a human. Thus, for example, a work generated by artificial intelligence cannot be a "work made for hire" if it lacks human authorship.

=== History ===
==== Early doctrine and the Copyright Act of 1909 ====
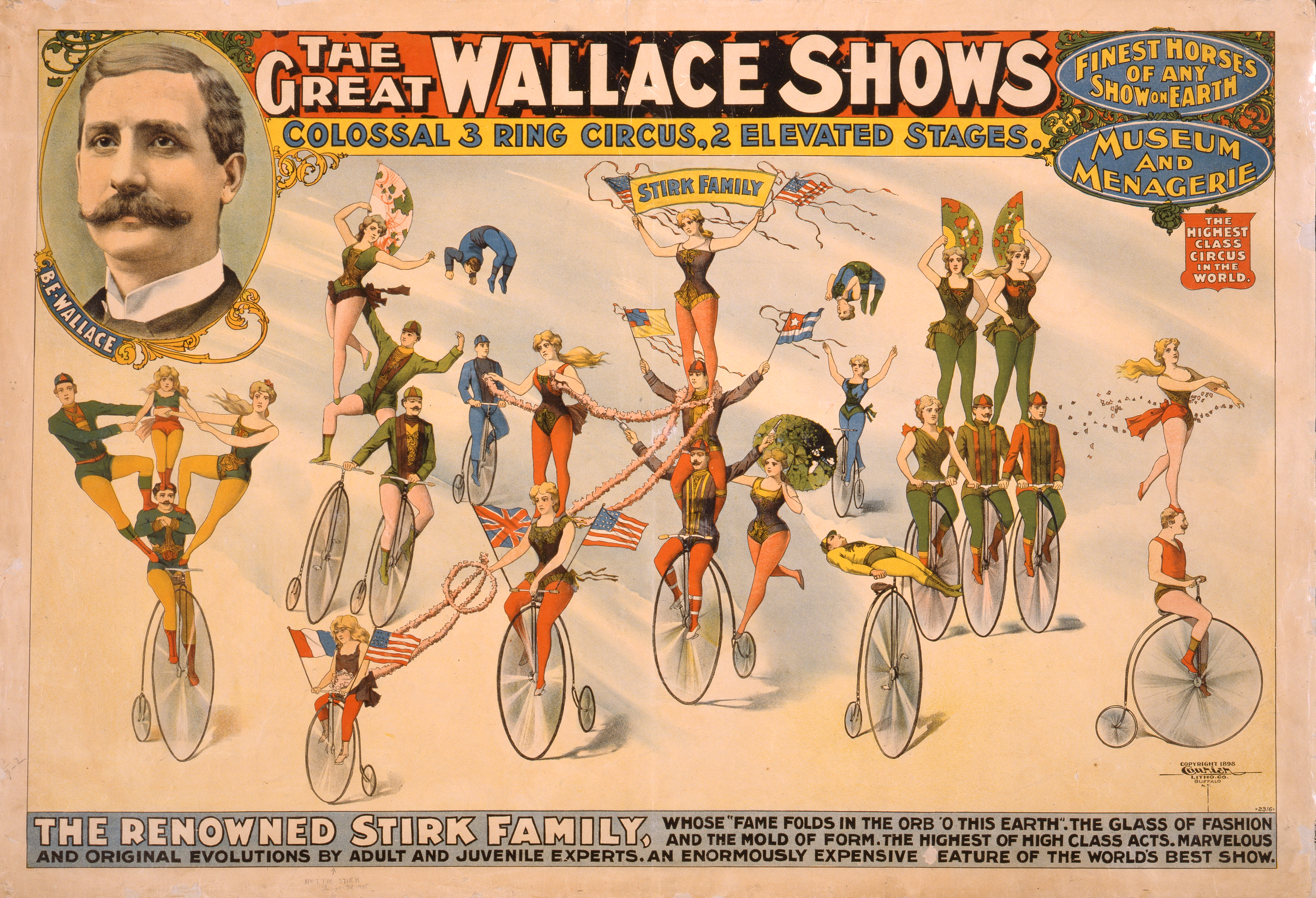
Bleistein v. Donaldson Lithographing Co. (1903), a case regarding the copyright status of advertisements such as this one, is cited as an early example of the work for hire doctrine.

The work for hire doctrine was first recognized by the Supreme Court of the United States in Bleistein v. Donaldson Lithographing Co. (1903), a case regarding the copyrightability of advertisements created by employees of a lithography company. The Court upheld the employer's ownership of the works, implicitly recognizing that works created by employees in the course of their duties could be owned by the employer. The doctrine was later codified in the Copyright Act of 1909: "...the word 'author' shall include an employer in the case of works made for hire."

One controversy under the 1909 Act was the work-for-hire status of commissioned works created by independent contractors. Although the Act was silent on this matter, a series of court cases held that the copyright in a commissioned work could vest in the hiring party rather than the person who created the work. In Yardley v. Houghton Mifflin Co. (1939), Judge Thomas Walter Swan of the Second Circuit wrote that when a patron commissions a work of art, the patron is presumed to own the copyright even without a written agreement, "unless by the terms of the contract, express or implicit, the artist has reserved the copyright to himself." In Brattleboro Publishing Co. v. Winmill Publishing Corp. (1966), the Second Circuit extended the work-for-hire doctrine to cover commissioned works, provided that they were produced at the "instance and expense" of the hiring party. A later case clarified that the commissioner must also have "had the right to exercise control over the manner in which the artist executed the work" to be considered an "employer" under this standard.

The "teacher exception", an exception to the work-for-hire doctrine for faculty members at colleges and universities, was articulated in a series of court cases under the 1909 Act. For example, in Williams v. Weisser (1969), UCLA anthropology professor B.J. Williams successfully asserted common-law copyright in the content of his lectures against a company that was selling lecture notes to his students. In justifying Williams's copyright ownership of the lecture contents, the court explained: "No reason has been suggested why a university would want to retain ownership in a professor's expression. Such retention would be useless except possibly... for making it difficult for the teacher to give the same lectures, should he change jobs." It also cited precedent from the English court system, including the cases Abernethy v. Hutchinson and Caird v. Sime, establishing that professors and lecturers held common-law copyright to their lecture materials.

Under the 1909 Act, copyrights lasted for an initial term of 28 years, but could be renewed for another 28 years. For most works, even if an author had assigned all of their rights to another entity, such as a publisher or record company, during the first term, the copyright would automatically revert to the author at the beginning of the renewal term. In the case of works made for hire, there was no automatic reversion, and the renewal copyright vested in the current owner of the copyright, whether the original hiring party or someone who had obtained the copyright from them.

==== 1960s–70s copyright law revision ====
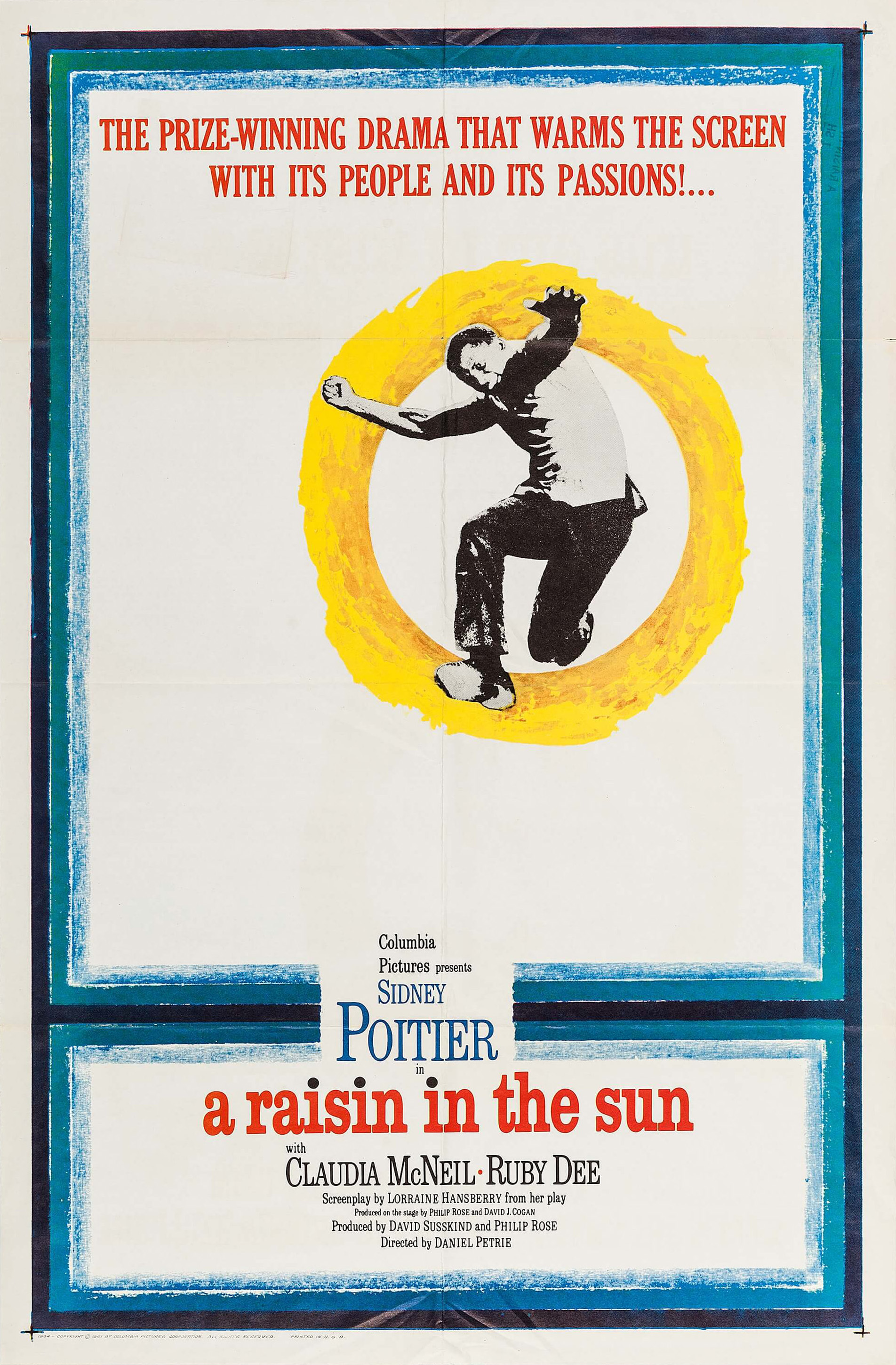
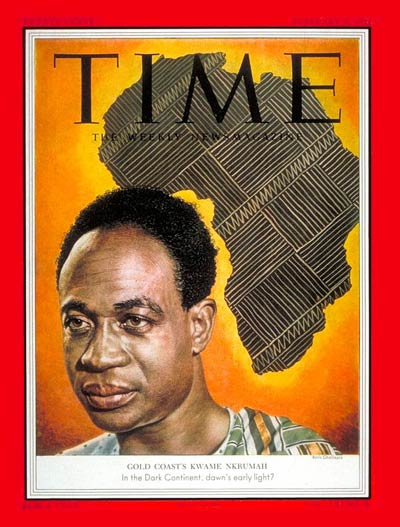
Films and collective works such as periodicals were among the kinds of works proposed to be eligible under the specially-commissioned prong of the revised work-for-hire definition, owing to the large numbers of people involved in their creation.

The work-for-hire doctrine was revamped during the copyright law revision efforts of the 1960s, which culminated in the Copyright Act of 1976. After extensive negotiations supervised by Congress and the Copyright Office, representatives of authors, composers, book and music publishers, and motion picture studios settled on the two-pronged approach now enshrined in the 1976 Act, which encompasses both works made by employees and certain types of specially ordered and commissioned works:

- contributions to collective works, such as periodicals, anthologies, and encyclopedias;
- parts of motion pictures and other audiovisual works;
- translations;
- supplementary works, such as forewords, afterwords, and illustrations for books;
- compilations;
- "instructional texts", including any "literary, pictorial, or graphic work prepared for publication and with the purpose of use in systematic instructional activities";
- tests and associated answer material; and
- atlases.

The question of whether each type of work should be eligible to be commissioned as a work made for hire hinged on the benefits and drawbacks of making them subject to the author's right to terminate a transfer of copyright. Introduced in the 1976 Act as a spiritual successor to the automatic reversion of renewal copyright, the termination right allows authors to reclaim copyrights to their works if they originally owned the copyrights. This provision does not apply to works originally created under work-for-hire arrangements.

During these negotiations, each of the nine categories was proposed by a particular copyright-based industry. Works in these categories tended to be done by freelance authors at the instance, direction, and risk of a publisher or producer, and it was argued that it would be unfair to allow such authors to terminate assignments of rights. Additionally, motion pictures and collective works were customarily created by large groups of people, and companies argued that allowing rights in these works to revert to individual contributors would risk fragmenting ownership and jeopardizing the companies' long-term ability to commercialize the works.

==== Sound recording debate ====
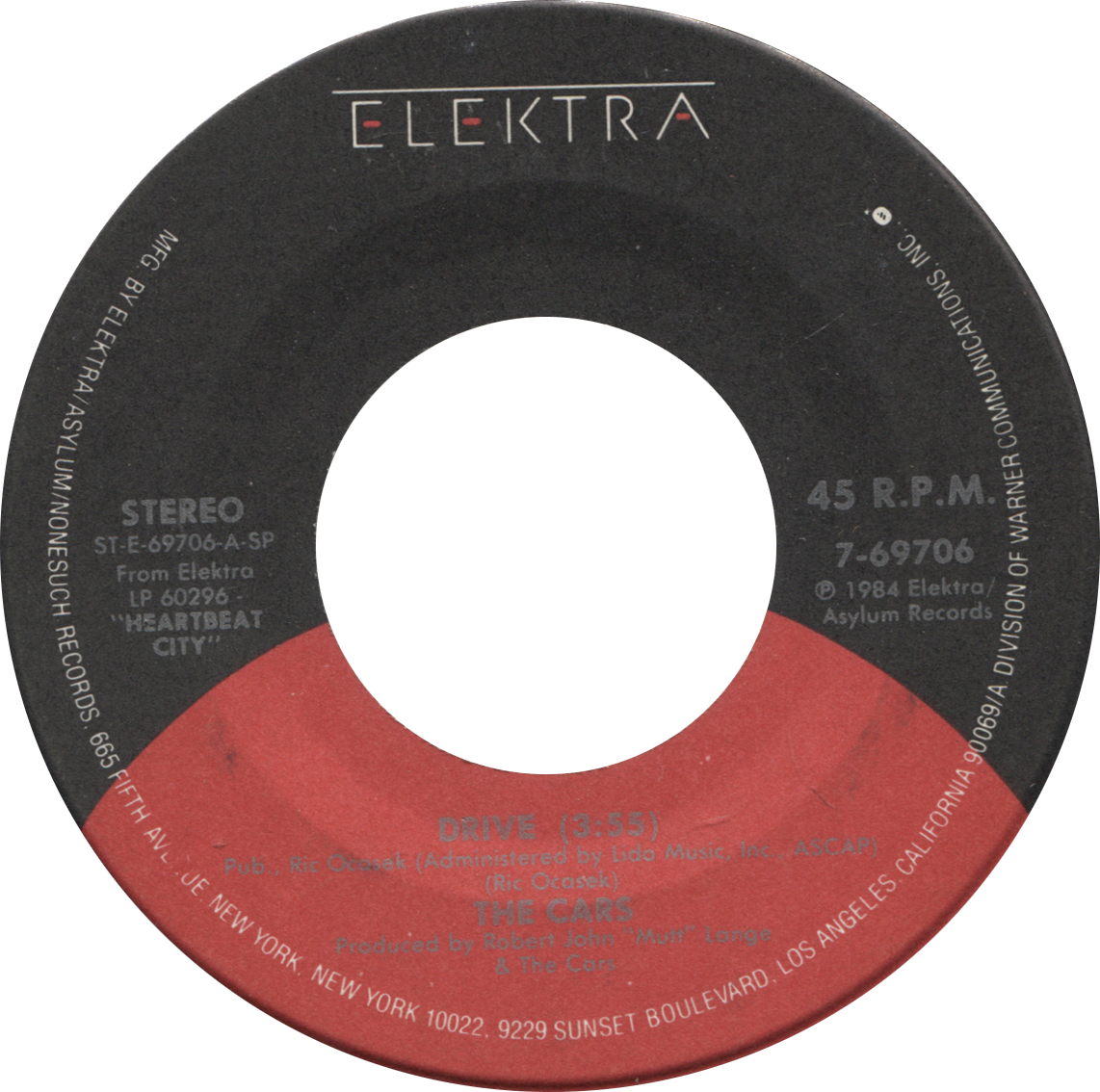
The passage of an amendment classifying sound recordings as subject matter eligible to be works made for hire in 1999 sparked a debate over artists' rights in their recorded music.

Although copyright protection for sound recordings was being contemplated contemporaneously with the mid-1960's debate over works made for hire, they were never proposed or considered for inclusion as a category in the specially ordered or commissioned work made for hire provision. Former Register of Copyrights Marybeth Peters speculated that "record companies did not seek to include sound recordings" among these categories because they were typically produced in recording studios where record companies exercised considerable control over the production process. This allowed record companies to assert that featured artists were "employees" creating the sound recordings in the course of an employment relationship, satisfying the first prong of the 1976 work-for-hire definition.

In November 1999, a work for hire–related amendment was inserted into the Satellite Home Viewer Improvement Act of 1999, adding sound recordings to the list of categories that could qualify as specially commissioned works made for hire. This resulted in backlash from recording artists, who voiced concern that the amendment would strip them of their termination rights in sound recordings transferred to record labels. Record companies argued that it was a technical amendment that merely clarified how existing law applied to industry practice, since the majority of sound recordings would have already qualified as contributions to collective works (i.e. albums). However, in a 2000 testimony before the House Judiciary Committee, Peters predicted that the amendment might "prove to be anything but technical" if the music industry shifted to newer distribution models in which individual tracks could be unbundled from albums and downloaded separately.

In August 2000, the Recording Industry Association of America, representing record labels, and the Recording Artists' Coalition and other groups representing recording artists jointly agreed to recommend the repeal and retroactive cancellation of the work-for-hire amendment. Congress passed the Work Made for Hire and Copyright Corrections Act of 2000, which repealed the prior amendment and directed the courts and the Copyright Office to interpret the law as if neither the amendment nor its repeal had ever happened.

=== Works created by employees ===
This 2-D artwork of "Bugdroid", created by Irina Blok as the mascot of Google's Android operating system, has been registered as a work for hire.

If a work is created by an employee, the first prong of the work-for-hire definition applies. The determination of whether an individual is an employee for the purposes of the work made for hire doctrine is determined under the common law of agency, in which a court looks to a multitude of factors to determine whether an employer-employee relationship exists. To help determine who is an employee, the Supreme Court in Community for Creative Non-Violence v. Reid identified certain factors that characterize an employer–employee relationship as defined by agency law:

1. Control by the employer over the work (e.g., the employer may determine how the work is done, has the work done at the employer's location, and provides equipment or other means to create work)
2. Control by employer over the employee (e.g., the employer controls the employee's schedule in creating work, has the right to have the employee perform other assignments, determines the method of payment, and/or has the right to hire the employee's assistants)
3. Status and conduct of employer (e.g., the employer is in business to produce such works, provides the employee with benefits, and/or withholds tax from the employee's payment)

Furthermore, a work created by an employee can only be considered a work for hire if the employee did so while acting in the scope of their employment. This is determined by a three-step test.

==== Teacher exception ====
The application of the law to materials such as lectures, textbooks, and academic articles produced by teachers is somewhat unclear. The near-universal practice in education has traditionally been to act on the assumption that they were not work for hire.

A number of court cases under the 1909 Copyright Act established the "teacher exception", providing that works created by university faculty were not considered works made for hire, even though they were created within the scope of their employment. Whether the teacher exception has been preserved under the 1976 Act has been highly debated, however. According to Dave Hansen, "Despite the massive number of copyrighted works authored by university faculty after the 1976 Act (well over a hundred million scholarly articles alone, not to mention books and other creative works), we have seen very few cases addressing this particular issue."

Professor Elizabeth Townsend-Gard argues that the teacher exception has been "subsumed by a work-for-hire doctrine that the Supreme Court's definition of employment in CCNV v. Reid places teachers' materials under the scope of employment." However, many universities continue to treat works created by faculty as the intellectual property of their individual creators as a matter of academic tradition. Some universities, such as Yale, acknowledge that federal law makes these scholarly writings works for hire by default, but disclaim ownership of them with some exceptions.

==== Separated rights in film and television ====
The Writers Guild of America, East and West have negotiated for a system of "separated rights" for screenwriters employed under WGA contracts. Even though screenplays and teleplays created under union contracts are legally works made for hire, certain rights may be transferred to the screenwriter under certain conditions.

==== Business owners and startups ====
In Woods v. Resnick (2010), the Western District of Wisconsin found that a business owner is neither an employee nor an independent contractor for copyright purposes. Since "an owner has an inherent right to control the business", the owner cannot be considered an agent, let alone an employee, so the work for hire doctrine does not apply to them. By contrast, the Compendium of U.S. Copyright Office Practices states that "senior officers or owners of organizations may be considered employees if they prepared a work while acting within the scope of their duties," so such works could be considered works made for hire.

Entertainers or artists who use loan-out corporations to provide services to clients classify themselves as employees of the loan-out company, which could result in their creative output being rendered works for hire, even though the loan-out company is owned by the artist themselves. One sample loan-out agreement relies on "express work-for-hire language" when the artist's work is considered a contribution to a collective work or a part of an audiovisual work.

Where startup technology companies are concerned, some courts have considered that the traditional factors for finding that an author is an "employee" can be less important than in more-established companies, for example if the employee works remotely and is not directly supervised, or if the employee is paid entirely in equity without benefits or tax withholding.

==== Volunteers and unpaid interns ====
The law firm Telios Law cautions that works created by unpaid volunteers and interns are generally not works made for hire, citing the case Hubay v. Mendez (2020). The case centered on the ownership of photographs taken by an unpaid volunteer during a trip organized by a nonprofit. In a judgment, the district court wrote:

...the inescapable fact is that the "work made for hire" doctrine does not apply here. Instead, that doctrine applies only to works produced by employees or, if a written contract exists, independent contractors. An unpaid volunteer for a nonprofit organization is neither. Alternatively, applying the familiar Reid factors, the Court finds that Mr. Losieniecki was not operating as the equivalent of an employee under the "work made for hire" doctrine, and so owns the photographs on that basis, as well.

The court emphasized that the Reid factors are used to "determine 'whether a hired party is an employee under the general common law of agency.'... At a minimum, courts have generally held that the concept of hiring includes an 'antecedent requirement of remuneration.'" The volunteer in this case, Robert Losieniecki, received free lodging paid for by the nonprofit, but the court held that this was "the sort of 'minor benefit associated with a volunteer position' that 'do[es] not constitute compensation, particularly when [it is] not related to career opportunities.'" Consequently, Losieniecki "was not a 'hired party' at all, and thus could not have been an 'employee' of MSTM for purposes of the 'work for hire' exception to the Copyright Act."

Nevertheless, the third edition of the Compendium of U.S. Copyright Office Practices claims that "a work created by an individual volunteer(s) may or may not be considered a work made for hire, depending on the facts and circumstances of the case."

==== Analogy to works of the United States government ====
Works created by officers and employees of the United States federal government as part of their official duties are not subject to copyright protection in the United States. House Report 94-1476, published in connection with the Copyright Act of 1976, explains that "although the wording of the definition of 'work of the United States Government' differs somewhat from that of the definition of 'work made for hire,' the concepts are intended to be construed in the same way." Cases regarding the status of works prepared by employees of the U.S. government have been cited in work-for-hire cases: for example, in Williams v. Weisser, a case establishing the teacher exception, the court discussed Sherrill v. Grieves, in which a book written by a professor at a U.S. Army officers' school for a course he was teaching was held not to be a "publication of the United States Government" under the Copyright Act of 1909.

=== Specially ordered or commissioned works ===
If a work is created by an independent contractor or freelancer, or by an employee outside the normal scope of their employment, the work may be considered a work for hire only if all of the following conditions are met:

- the work must be specially ordered or commissioned;
- the work must come within one of the nine enumerated categories of works: (1) a contribution to a collective work, (2) a part of a motion picture or other audiovisual work, (3) a translation, (4) a supplementary work, (5) a compilation, (6) an instructional text, (7) a test, (8) answer material for a test, (9) an atlas;
- there must be a written agreement between the parties specifying that the work is a work made for hire by use of the phrase "work for hire" or "work made for hire."

In Playboy Enterprises, Inc. v. Dumas, the Second Circuit Court of Appeals equated the phrase "specially ordered or commissioned" in the 1976 Act definition of work for hire to the "instance and expense" test that emerged under the 1909 Act. According to the court, a work is specially ordered or commissioned when "a hiring party pays an independent contractor for his or her work" (i.e. the work is made at the hiring party's "expense") and when "the hiring party has specifically asked the independent contractor for a work" (i.e. it is made at their "instance").

The "specially ordered or commissioned" prong of the work-for-hire definition is applicable not only to independent contractors but also to works prepared by employees outside the normal scope of their employment. The American Association of University Professors gives the example of a university commissioning an art history professor "under special contract to write a catalog for a campus art gallery"; the resulting work could be designated as a work made for hire if the other statutory conditions are satisfied.

Crucially, mutual agreement that a work is a work for hire is not enough. Any agreement not meeting all of the above criteria is not a valid work for hire agreement and all rights to the work will remain with the creator. Further, courts have held that the agreement must be negotiated, though not signed, before the work begins.

According to case law, retroactive contractual designation as a work for hire is not permitted. Furthermore, a valid work-made-for-hire agreement must be signed by both parties (the creator of the work and the commissioning party who is to be considered the author).

==== Commissioned works created by companies ====
Even works created on commission by one business entity for another can be recognized as works made for hire. In Brattleboro Publishing Co. v. Winmill Publishing Corp. (1966), the Second Circuit ruled that an advertisement created by a newspaper for its client was a work made for hire. The Compendium of U.S. Copyright Office Practices provides a modern example:

Lighthouse Books Inc. is the author of a textbook. The company hired Nous Traduisons Inc. to translate this work from English into French. Before Nous Traduisons began working on this project, the parties signed a written agreement stating that Nous Traduisons would translate the textbook for Lighthouse Books as a work made for hire. The work satisfies the second part of the statutory definition, because a translation is one of the nine categories of works that may be specially ordered or commissioned and because the parties signed a written agreement specifying that the work would be created for Lighthouse Books as a work made for hire. In the application to register this work, Lighthouse Books, Inc. should be named as the author of the translation and the work made for hire box should be checked “yes.”

=== Termination of copyright transfers ===
An author has the inalienable right to terminate a copyright transfer 35 years after agreeing to permanently relinquish the copyright. However, according to the US Copyright Office, Circular 9 "the termination provisions of the law do not apply to works made for hire." These restrictions, in both the work for hire doctrine and the right of termination, exist out of recognition that artists frequently face unequal bargaining power in their business dealings. Nonetheless, failure to secure a work-for-hire agreement by commissioning organizations can create difficult situations. One such example is the artist Raymond Kaskey's 1985 statue Portlandia, an iconic symbol of the city of Portland, Oregon. Unlike most works of public art, Kaskey has put strong prohibitions on the use of images of the statue, located atop the main entrance to the famous Portland Building. He sued Paramount Pictures for including shots of the statue in the Madonna motion picture Body of Evidence. As a result, it is nearly impossible to film portions of one of downtown Portland's most vibrant neighborhoods, and the city has lost out on the potential to create merchandise and souvenirs from one of its most iconic landmarks.

An author can grant his or her copyright (if any) to the hiring party. However, if not a work made for hire, the author or the author's heirs may exercise their right to terminate the grant. Termination of a grant cannot be effective until 35 years after the execution of the grant or, if the grant covers the right of publication, no earlier than 40 years after the execution of the grant or 35 years after publication under the grant (whichever comes first).

=== Benefits and drawbacks ===
When relying on agreements in which creators transfer rights to a hiring party (copyright transfer agreement), a hiring party often finds that it has only limited scope to alter, update, or transform the work. For example, a motion picture may hire dozens of creators of copyrightable works (e.g., music scores, scripts, sets, sound effects, costumes) any one of which would require repeated agreements with the creators if conditions for showing the film or creating derivatives of it changed. Failing to reach agreement with any one creator could prevent the showing of the film entirely. To avoid this scenario, producers of motion pictures and similar works require that all contributions by non-employees be works made for hire.

On the other hand, a work for hire agreement is less desirable for creators than a copyright transfer agreement. Under work for hire, the commissioning party owns all rights from the very start even if the contract is breached, whereas under a transfer of rights, the creator can hold back the rights until all terms of the contract are fulfilled. Holding back the rights can be a forceful tool when it is necessary to compel a commissioning party to fulfill its obligations.

=== Relationship to author accreditation ===
Accreditation has no impact on work for hire in the US. The actual creator may or may not be publicly credited for the work, and this credit does not affect its legal status. States that are party to the Berne Convention for the Protection of Literary and Artistic Works recognize separately copyrights and moral rights, with moral rights including the right of the actual creators to publicly identify themselves as such, and to maintain the integrity of their work.

For example, Microsoft hired many programmers to develop the Windows operating system, which is credited simply to Microsoft Corporation. By contrast, Adobe Systems lists many of the developers of Photoshop in its credits. In both cases, the software is the property of the employing company. In both cases, the actual creators have moral rights. Similarly, newspapers routinely credit news articles written by their staff, and publishers credit the writers and illustrators who produce comic books featuring characters such as Batman or Spider-Man, but the publishers hold copyrights to the work. However, articles published in academic journals, or work produced by freelancers for magazines, are not generally works created as a work for hire, which is why it is common for the publisher to require the copyright owner, the author, to sign a copyright transfer, a short legal document transferring specific author copyrights to the publisher. In this case the authors retain those copyrights in their work not granted to the publisher.

The performing rights organization Broadcast Music, Inc. (BMI) requires that the actual composers of a song be credited even if the song is produced as a work for hire. The copyright owner is entitled to claim the publisher's share of the composition royalties, but the writer's share remains with the composer unless a royalty assignment form is completed.

== In other countries ==
Many other countries have laws governing the copyright status of works created within the scope of an employee's duties. These provisions are sometimes equated to the American work for hire doctrine.

=== Commonwealth countries ===
==== United Kingdom ====
Under the copyright law of the United Kingdom, the first owner of copyright in a work may be the employer of the person who created it:

Where a literary, dramatic, musical or artistic work, or a film, is made by an employee in the course of his employment, his employer is the first owner of any copyright in the work subject to any agreement to the contrary.

— Copyright, Designs and Patents Act 1988, Section 11(2)

The expression "in the course of employment" is not defined in the Copyright, Designs and Patents Act, but in settling disputes, UK courts usually evaluate whether the employee created the work under a "contract of service" (e.g. as an employee) or a "contract for services" (e.g. as a freelancer or independent contractor). This statute has been compared to the work for hire doctrine in the United States.

There is currently no provision for initial ownership of copyright in commissioned works to vest in the hiring party; however, prior to 1 August 1989, "the copyright in photographs, portraits and engravings (and only those types of work) which were created as a result of a commission were owned by the commissioner." Under current law, the first owner of copyright in any commissioned work is the person or organization that created it, but there may be an implied non-exclusive license for the hiring party to use the work for the purpose for which it was commissioned.

==== Canada ====
Canadian copyright law does not have an equivalent to the American "work for hire" doctrine, and the individual creator of a work is always considered the author of the work. However, where a work is prepared by an employee in the course of their employment, the author's employer is the first owner of copyright in the work. If a work is prepared under commission by an independent contractor, the contractor is both the author and the first owner of copyright. This stands in contrast to United States law, in which the employer or commissioning party is considered both the "author" and the first owner of copyright in the work.

Section 13 of the Canadian Copyright Act provides that the first owner of the copyright in a work is typically the author, except that the copyright for a work made in the course of employment initially vests in the author's employer:

Where the author of a work was in the employment of some other person under a contract of service or apprenticeship and the work was made in the course of his employment by that person, the person by whom the author was employed shall, in the absence of any agreement to the contrary, be the first owner of the copyright, but where the work is an article or other contribution to a newspaper, magazine or similar periodical, there shall, in the absence of any agreement to the contrary, be deemed to be reserved to the author a right to restrain the publication of the work, otherwise than as part of a newspaper, magazine or similar periodical.

— R.S., 1985, c. C-42, s. 13(3)

Prior to June 29, 2012, Section 13(2) provided that the first owner of the copyright in commissioned engravings, photographs, and portraits was the person who paid for the works to be made:

Where, in the case of an engraving, photograph or portrait, the plate or other original was ordered by some other person and was made for valuable consideration, and the consideration was paid, in pursuance of that order, in the absence of any agreement to the contrary, the person by whom the plate or other original was ordered shall be the first owner of the copyright.

— R.S., 1985, c. C-42, s. 13(2)

This provision was repealed by the Copyright Modernization Act, which received royal assent on June 29, 2012.

==== India ====
As in the UK, the work for hire doctrine in India is based on the concept of the first owner of copyright. Under section 17 of the Copyright Act, 1957, the first owner of the copyright in a work is the author, except in the following cases:

- Copyright in a work made by an employee under a contract of service or apprenticeship vests in the employer, unless the employer and employee agree otherwise. Special rules apply for literary, dramatic, and artistic works created by an employee of a newspaper, magazine, or other periodical.
- If a photograph, painting, portrait, engraving, or film is made "for valuable consideration at the instance of" another person, that person is the first owner of copyright unless agreed otherwise.
- Generally, the first owner of copyright in a speech is the person delivering the speech. However, if that person is giving the speech on behalf of another person, that person is the first owner of the copyright.
- For works made by the government of India, any "public undertaking" of the Indian government, or an international organization, the first owner of copyright is the organization that produced the work.

=== Ethiopia ===
Under the Proclamation No. 410/2004 on Copyright and Neighboring Rights Protection, Article 21/4 (Federal Negarit Gazeta):

Where the work is a work created by an author employed or Commissioned by a person in the course of his employment or contract of service, unless agreed otherwise, the original owner of the rights shall be the employer or the person who commissioned the work.

=== Japan ===
Article 15 of the Japanese Copyright Act (Act No. 48 of May 6, 1970) provides that:

(1) For a work (except computer programming) that an employee of a corporation or other employers (hereinafter in this Article such a corporation or other employers are referred to as a "corporation, etc.") makes in the course of duty at the initiative of the corporation, etc., and that the corporation, etc. makes public as a work of its own authorship, the author is the corporation, etc., so long as it is not stipulated otherwise in a contract, in employment rules, or elsewhere at the time the work is made.

(2) For a work of computer programming that an employee of a corporation, etc. makes at the initiative of the corporation, etc. in the course of duty, the author is the corporation, etc., so long as it is not stipulated otherwise in a contract, in employment rules, or elsewhere at the time the work is made.

If a corporation (or other employer) is deemed the author of a work, the copyright, as well as the moral rights of the author, are vested in the corporation. For a work other than a computer program to be deemed a "work made for hire", it must be published in the name of the corporation, with the corporation identified as the author. This requirement does not apply to computer programs because many programs are created without the intention of being published.

=== The Netherlands ===
Articles 7 and 8 of the Dutch Copyright Act (Auteurswet) provide for an employer or organization to be considered the author of a work by default.

Article 7. Where labour carried out by an employee consists in the making of certain literary, scientific or artistic works, the employer shall be deemed the author thereof, unless otherwise agreed between the parties.

Article 8. A public institution, association, foundation or company which communicates a work to the public as its own, without naming any natural person as the author thereof, shall be regarded as the author of that work, unless it is proved that the communication to the public in such manner was unlawful.

=== Philippines ===
The copyright law of the Philippines provides for allocation of copyright ownership between employees and employers:

In the case of work created by an author during and in the course of his employment, the copyright shall belong to:

(a) The employee, if the creation of the object of copyright is not a part of his regular duties even if the employee uses the time, facilities and materials of the employer.

(b) The employer, if the work is the result of the performance of his regularly-assigned duties, unless there is an agreement, express or implied, to the contrary.

— 8293/2015 Section 178.3

However, when a work is "commissioned by a person other than an employer of the author", the law provides the client with ownership of the physical copy of the work, but the copyright to the work remains with the creator unless there is a written agreement to the contrary. (8293/2015 Section 178.4)

=== South Korea ===
The official English translation of the copyright law of South Korea uses the term "work made for hire" for works prepared by employees in the course of their employment:

The authorship of a work made for hire which is made by an employee of a legal person, etc. during the course of his duties and is made public under the name of such a legal person, etc. as the author shall be attributed to that legal person, etc., unless otherwise stipulated in the contract or work regulation, etc.: Provided, That in cases of a computer program work (hereinafter referred to as "program"), being made public is not required.

— Article 9 (Author of Works Made for Hire)

Article 41 provides that the copyright term of a work made for hire lasts for 70 years after it has been made public, or for 70 years after its creation if it was not made public within the first 50 years since its creation.

== Copyright duration ==
=== United States ===
In the United States a "work for hire" (published after 1978) receives copyright protection until 120 years after creation or 95 years after publication, whichever comes first. This differs from the standard U.S. copyright term, life of the author plus 70 years, because the "author" of a work for hire is often not an actual person, in which case the standard term would be unlimited, which is unconstitutional. Works published prior to 1978 have no differentiation in copyright term between works made for hire and works with recognized individual creators.

=== European Union ===
In the European Union, even if a Member State provides for the possibility of a legal person to be the original rightholder, then the duration of protection is in general the same as the copyright term for a personal copyright: i.e., for a literary or artistic work, 70 years from the death of the human author, or in the case of works of joint authorship, 70 years from the death of the last surviving author. If the natural author or authors are not identified, nor become known subsequently, then the copyright term is the same as that for an anonymous or pseudonymous work, i.e. 70 years from publication for a literary or artistic work; or, if the work has not been published in that time, 70 years from creation. (Copyright durations for works created before 1993 may be subject to transitional arrangements.)

An exception is for scientific or critical editions of works in the public domain. Per article 70 of the German copyright law, editions as the result of scholarly or scientific analysis have a copyright length of 25 years. Therefore, the editor of an urtext score of an opera by Beethoven would only receive 25 years of protection, but the arrangement of the full orchestral part for piano would receive a full 70 year protection – timed from the publication of the piano arrangement and not the death of the editor. Editing is a proper work-for-hire activity.

== See also ==
- Copyright Act of 1976 (U.S.)
- Copyright, Designs and Patents Act 1988 (CDPA; UK)
- Copyright law of the European Union
- Derivative work
- World Intellectual Property Organization (WIPO)
