= Collective work =

Compilation of multiple independent works

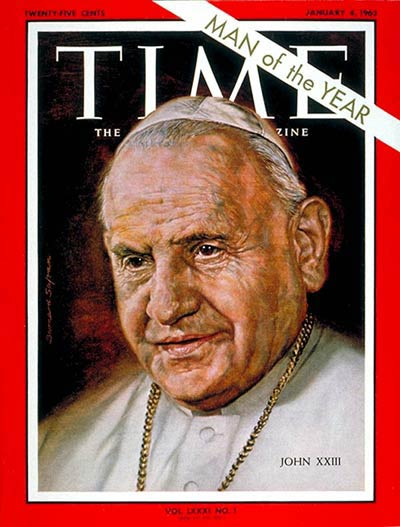
Time cover from 1963. Copyright was not renewed, so the collective work is in the public domain. The artist, Bernard Safran (1924–1995), created 73 covers for Time.

A collective work is a work that contains the works of several authors assembled and published under the direction of one natural or legal person who owns the copyright in the work as a whole. Definitions vary considerably from one country to another, but usually treat ownership of the work as a whole as distinct from ownership of the individual contributions, so the individual authors may retain the right to publish their work elsewhere. It is common for publication of articles on the Internet, when isolated from the context of the overall work, to be considered to be outside of the standard agreement between the author and the owner of the collective work.

== General ==
=== International agreements ===
Many countries have agreed to be bound by the terms of the Berne Convention and/or the TRIPS Agreement.

Article 2.5 of the Berne Convention for the Protection of Literary and Artistic Works (Paris Text 1971) specifies: "Collections of literary or artistic works such as encyclopaedias and anthologies which, by reason of the selection and arrangement of their contents, constitute intellectual creations shall be protected as such, without prejudice to the copyright in each of the works forming part of such collections."

Section 10.2 of the TRIPS Agreement, to which members of the World Trade Organization are bound, states, "Compilations of data or other material, whether in machine readable or other form, which by reason of the selection or arrangement of their contents constitute intellectual creations shall be protected as such. Such protection, which shall not extend to the data or material itself, shall be without prejudice to any copyright subsisting in the data or material itself."

=== Limitation on publisher rights ===
In general, the author of a contribution to a collective work retains the copyright, and the publisher does not have the right to reuse the contribution in some context other than the collective work without the express consent of the author. In England it has been held that exploiting the work of a freelance newspaper photographer in a back numbers website was a use that had not been contemplated in the original license and was not covered by the license. Such reuse would also infringe the journalist's copyright in the United States. In a 1997 case in the Netherlands it was held that reuse of newspaper articles on a website and CD-ROM went beyond the implied license. In Germany any attempt by the author to grant rights to exploit their work in a way that was unknown when the contract was made is null and void under the law. In France, online publication is considered fundamentally different from print publication.

=== Creative Commons ===
The Creative Commons legal code for Attribution-NonCommercial 2.0 (CC2.0) defines a collective work as:

"Collective Work" means a work, such as a periodical issue, anthology or encyclopedia, in which the Work in its entirety in unmodified form, along with a number of other contributions, constituting separate and independent works in themselves, are assembled into a collective whole. A work that constitutes a Collective Work will not be considered a Derivative Work (as defined below) for the purposes of this License.

The license for a CC2.0 work allows the user to incorporate the CC2.0 work in a collective work in all media and formats whether now known or hereafter devised. The collective work does not have to be released under a Creative Commons license, but access to the incorporated CC2.0 work must be consistent with the CC2.0 license, and the author must be credited.

== Common law countries ==
The British Statute of Anne (1710) was the first copyright law in the world. The statute is considered a "watershed event in Anglo-American copyright history ... transforming what had been the publishers' private law copyright into a public law grant". Under the statute, copyright was for the first time vested in authors rather than publishers; it also included provisions for the public interest, such as a legal deposit scheme. The statute was an influence on copyright law in several other nations, including the United States, and even in the 21st century is "frequently invoked by modern judges and academics as embodying the utilitarian underpinnings of copyright law".

=== Australia ===
In Australia a collective work is a work composed of separate parts that each attract their own copyright. An example would be a song in which the author of the music and the author of the lyrics each have copyright in their contribution. The authors have a moral right to be attributed, but only if they are author of a substantial part and it is reasonable to identify the author. It may be unreasonable to attribute each author in a collective work such as an encyclopedia.

=== Canada ===
Under Canadian copyright law, a collective work means:

(a) an encyclopaedia, dictionary, year book or similar work,
(b) a newspaper, review, magazine or similar periodical, and
(c) any work written in distinct parts by different authors, or in which works or parts of works of different authors are incorporated;

When the author of a work is the first owner of copyright, any rights granted by the author revert to his estate. However, this does not apply to the assignment of the copyright in a collective work or a licence to publish a work or part of a work as part of a collective work.

Robertson v Thomson Corp, [2006] 2 S.C.R. 363, 2006 SCC 43 is a 2006 Supreme Court of Canada decision on the ownership of copyright in published text that are stored in databases. The ruling held that though a newspaper held the copyright in the collection and the arrangement of freelance articles and in its newspaper, it could not publish the articles within a database. Publication within the database would remove the articles from the context of the collective work and therefore their publication as such was not within the rights held by the newspaper. Robertson decided that freelance journalists' copyright can stop the republication of their articles onto databases which display one article at a time but not onto CD-ROMs featuring whole newspapers. The court decided that a CD-ROM in which individual articles may only be viewed in the context of a whole newspaper is not a republication of an individual article as an individual work, but is rather a reproduction of the newspaper as a whole as a work.

=== United Kingdom ===
In the United Kingdom section 178 of the Copyright, Designs and Patents Act 1988 (CDPA) defines a collective work as either "(a) a work of joint authorship or (b) a work in which there are distinct contributions by different authors or in which works or parts of works of different authors are incorporated." The general principle is that authors who contribute to a collective work have the right to control future exploitation in their works unless this is expressly waived in the contract. The editor receives a separate copyright in the collective work for their efforts as long as they meet the originality standard set by the government. The copyright law related to collective works does not provide an exception to the general European term of protection of 70 years following death, which would apply to death of the last surviving author.

The Copyright Act 1842 stated that the authors of contributions to collective works did not retain full copyright control over their works. However, they had the right to be paid, the right to refuse consent for additional uses of their work, reversion of copyright after 28 years and (if agreed with the owner of the collective work) the ability to publish their own work. The 1911 Act, which replaced the 1842 Act, stated that the owner of a collective work would only gain ownership of the copyright of contributions where they had given or promised some valuable consideration and there was no agreement to the contrary. The author would retain copyright if this could be inferred from the mutual intention of the parties. Under the Copyright Act 1911 (1 & 2 Geo. 5. c. 46), no copyright vests in the proprietor of a collective work unless the author is employed under a contract of service or apprenticeship, or there is an assignment in writing; and when the copyright vests in the proprietor of a periodical by reason of a contract of service or apprenticeship, the author may restrain separate publication.

With the 1911 act the author of a contribution would regain copyright after 25 years, but this would be concurrent with the publisher's right in the collective work. It was argued that reversion of full rights to the author would have been "a great hardship to proprietors of collective works, particularly of those permanent in nature, such as ecyclopaedias, if they could not have acquired from the author an unfettered right to produce the work at any future time as part of the collective work." The author could, however, restrain the publisher from transferring or licensing their work to others. Under the Copyright Act 1956 employees retained copyright in their work unless there was an agreement to the contrary. The CDPA removed the waiver on employee rights.

=== United States ===
In the Copyright law of the United States, the Copyright Act of 1976, section 101, defines a collective work as "a work, such as a periodical issue, anthology, or encyclopedia, in which a number of contributions, constituting separate and independent works in themselves, are assembled into a collective whole". It is protected as long as the "author" can show that the selection and organization of the contributions is original, and that these contribution can themselves be protected, as opposed to being mere facts such as statistical data.

Article 201 (c) states, "Copyright in each separate contribution to a collective work is distinct from copyright in the collective work as a whole, and vests initially in the author of the contribution. In the absence of an express transfer of the copyright or of any rights under it, the owner of copyright in the collective work is presumed to have acquired only the privilege of reproducing and distributing the contribution as part of that particular collective work, any revision of that collective work, and any later collective work in the same series". The compiler, or author of the collection, owns copyright in the expression he or she contributed, which is primarily the selection and arrangement of the separate contributions, but may include such things as a preface, advertisements, etc., that the collective author created. The contributions remain the property of the authors by default, but the property may be passed to the owner of the collective work by contract. They may also obtain ownership of the contributions if they are works made for hire.

The Supreme Court case of New York Times Co. v. Tasini (2001) concerned free-lance journalists who had been paid for their contributions to paper editions of newspapers and magazines, but their contracts had not covered digital rights for reproduction on CD-ROMs or publication on the Internet. When the articles were distributed in electronic form a few years later, the court ruled that this did not constitute a revision of the work, because the articles could be accessed individually. A revision must maintain the articles in their context of origin. In Faulkner v. National Geographic Enterprises Inc. (2005), a Court of Appeal ruled that an electronic version of a newspaper was a revision of the collective work if it reproduced the paper version identically, including advertisements and photographs.

== European countries ==
"The New Renaissance", the report of the Comité des Sages Reflection Group on Bringing Europe's Cultural Heritage Online, published on 10 January 2011, stated that the public sector had a duty to digitize their cultural heritage. Under the heading of "Ensuring wide access to and use of digitised public domain material" the report stated:

- Cultural institutions should make public domain material digitised with public funding as widely available as possible for access and re-use. This cross-border access should be part of the funding conditions for digitisation across Europe. The use of intrusive watermarks or other means that limit the use of the material should be avoided.
- The European Commission should consider ways and means to eliminate the differences in the rights status of digitised material between the Member States in a context where cross-border access and use is the norm. In principle the mere digitisation process should not generate any new rights.

The Copyright Term Directive of 2006 was intended to address the second concern, but has not been effective in harmonizing the terms and definitions. It does state that the term of protection for works whose right-holder is a legal person, as well as for collective works, is 70 years after the work is made available to the public. It also states that where "the natural persons who have created the [collective] work are identified as such in the versions of the works which are made available to the public" the duration of protection is 70 years after the death of the last surviving author. However, there is no standard European definition of the terms "works of joint authorship" and "collective works", so each country must define laws and make legal decisions over when a work with multiple authors is a work of joint authorship, collective work or simply a collection of separate works.

=== Czech Republic ===
In the Czech Republic a collective work is a work that is created with the participation of more than one authors at the initiative and under the management of a natural person or of a legal entity and made available to the public under that person's or entity's name and where the individual contributions involved in the work are not capable of independent use. The work is protected for 70 years after it was made publicly available.

=== France ===
The concept of a collective work (œuvre collective) in the copyright law of France is complex, and case law and scholarly views do not always agree. Bernard Edelman, in his l'œuvre collective: une définition introuvable (1998), describes the legal definition of collective works as "obscure and tangled". However, all authorities agree that the concept of an oeuvre collective in France covers dictionaries, encyclopaedias and periodical works such as newspapers or magazines.

A "collective work" in France is a work created at the initiative of a natural or legal person who edits it, publishes it and discloses it under his direction and name and in which the personal contributions of the various authors who participated in its production are merged in the overall work for which they were conceived, without it being possible to attribute to each author a separate right in the work as created. "A collective work shall be the property, unless proved otherwise, of the natural or legal person under whose name it has been disclosed. The author's rights shall vest in such person." "In the case of ... collective works, the term of the exclusive right shall be 70 years from January 1 of the calendar year following that in which the work was published."

It does not matter whether the contributors are identified or remain anonymous. The maître takes all the ownership rights in a collective work, and these rights are directly vested in the maître rather than transferred from the contributors, as long as the maître directed the creative process enough for it to be considered a collective work. In a 22 March 2012 decision the French Supreme Court (Cour de cassation) stated that "the natural or legal person at the initiative of a collective work is vested with the author's rights over this work and, in particular, the moral rights prerogatives". Each contributor to the collective work retains the moral rights to their contribution.

The rise of the Internet has opened new questions about the rights of the authors of contributions to a collective work. When a newspaper is reproduced in its entirety the reproduction falls under the collective work regime. Publication in successive editions of a newspaper during the course of the day, each of which reproduces a large part of the previous edition, is not seen as publication in another newspaper. Electronic publication of the entire newspaper could therefore be seen as an edition of the same collective work. However, partial or selective reproduction may require the agreement of the contributors. Further, the contributors to a newspaper may have the right to separately publish a thematic selection of articles without infringing the rights of the owner of the collective work.

=== Germany ===
The main relevant law in Germany is the Copyright Act of 9 September 1965, the Gesetz über Urheberrecht und verwandte Schutzrechte (UrhG). German copyright law defines collective works as collections of works, data, or other independent elements, provided that the collection itself is a personal intellectual creation (UrhG, sec. 4 para 1), in other words: a work as defined by UrhG, sec. 2 para 2. The authors grant the rights of exploitation to a third party who decides what works to include in the collection. The difference from a work of joint authorship is that it is practical to separately exploit the parts of a collective work, while that cannot be done with parts of a work of joint authorship. It is possible to distinguish between the collection as a work and the parts as different works.

Since the authors retain copyright in their contributions, both the authors and the creator of the collective work must consent to its exploitation. The creator and the authors of the contributions may enforce their rights separately. The copyright term of each contribution is measured from the death of the author of the contribution. The collective work resembles a joint work in that the author of each contribution may require the consent to alteration or exploitation of all the contributors "if such consent may reasonably be demanded of them". Two years after granting an exploitation right to an editor, or after delivering the work to the editor, the author can revoke the grant if the work has not been published and the author has been harmed as a result.

=== Hungary ===
In Hungary a work shall be regarded as a collective work if the contributions of the authors co-operating in the creation of the work are combined in the product of joint creation in a manner which makes the separate determination of the individual authors' rights impossible. In the case of a collective work ... the copyright shall be transferred by legal succession to the natural or legal person, business company or legal entity at whose initiative and under whose instructions the work was created and who published it in his own name. The term of protection of a collective work shall be seventy years counted from the first day of the year following the first disclosure of the work.

=== Italy ===
Article 3 of the Italian Copyright Law defines collective works as formed by "the assembling of works or parts of works possessing the character of a self-contained creation resulting from selection and coordination with a specific literary, scientific, didactic, religious, political or artistic aim, such as encyclopaedias, dictionaries, anthologies, magazines and newspapers". The collective work as a whole is protected for 70 years from publication. For magazines, newspapers and other periodical works, each individual part or issue is given an independent term. The collective works shall be protected as original works, independently and without prejudice to the copyright on the works or parts of works of which they are composed."

Article 7 of the Copyright Law considers the author as the one who organizes and directs the creation of the work: "The author of a collective work is considered to be the person who organizes and directs its creation itself." What characterizes the collective work is not so much the structural element as the creative coexistence of two levels: that of individual contributions that make up the work and the total ideation of the work and the choice and coordination of contributions or of organization and direction of creative activity carried out by employees.

The individual parts of the collective work are deemed creative works, so the rights to them are retained by their individual creators. This is stated in paragraph 2 of Article 38 of the Copyright Law stating: "The right to use their own contributions separately is reserved for the individual employees of the collective work, in compliance with the agreed terms, and failing that, the following standards." Moreover, the Article 38 also provides that: "With a collective work, unless otherwise agreed, the right to economic use is with the publisher of the same" where "publisher" means the natural or legal person who assumes the economic risk and bear the costs imposed by the creation and publication of the work.

As part of these works we must therefore distinguish three distinct holders of rights: the author (who organizes and directs its creation), the publisher (who owns only the economic rights) and individual authors. Article 42 allows the use of a fragment from the collective work by the author provided it indicates the collective work from which it was taken, and the date of publication: "The author of the article or other work that is reproduced in a collective work shall be entitled to reproduce it in separate publications or collected in a volume, provided that it indicates the collective work from which it is taken and the date of publication."

=== Kosovo ===
In Kosovo the copyright in the collective work lasts for seventy years after the lawful disclosure of the work, unless the natural persons who have created the work are identified as such in the versions of the work which are disclosed to the public. In case of identification of the authors, copyright will last for seventy years from the date of death of the last surviving author. Property rights and other copyrights pertaining to a database or collective work created during employment are considered to have passed to the employer exclusively and without limitations, unless the contract provides otherwise,

A collective copyright work is a work created by collaboration of several authors, by combining their contribution separately into a whole such as encyclopedias, lexicons, databases, computer programs, collections and similar works at the initiative and under the direction of a natural or legal person as the ordering party. It is considered that the authors transfer unlimited and exclusive rights to all the material and other copyright in the collective work, unless otherwise provided by contract. The principal of the collective copyright work has the right to publish and use the work in its own name, but every copy of the work must contain a list of authors participating in the creation of collective work.

=== Netherlands ===
Under Dutch copyright law Article 5 states that "if a literary, scientific or artistic work consists of separate works by two or more persons, the person under whose guidance and supervision the work as a whole has been made or, if there is no such person, the compiler of the various works, shall be deemed the author of the whole work, without prejudice to the copyright in each of the works separately". This could apply to works such as anthologies or encyclopedias. The term of protection is not specified, so by default the collective work may be assumed to be protected until 70 years after the death of the person deemed to be author of the whole work. If this person is a legal person, protection would be for 70 years after publication.

=== Norway ===
In Norway a work is protected for 70 years following the year of death of the author. In a collective or joint work, this is counted from the death of the longest surviving author. For a motion picture, the following are considered authors: main director, scriptwriter, dialogue author, and composer of original musical score.

=== Spain ===
Under the 1987 copyright law of Spain collections of other works, such as anthologies, and other elements or data that by the selection or arrangement of materials constitute intellectual creations, are considered protected works without prejudice to the rights of the authors of the original works. A collective work is a work created by the initiative and under the coordination of a natural or legal person who edits and publishes it under their name and consists of the collection of contributions from different authors whose personal contributions are based on autonomous creation, and for whom it is not possible to attribute separately a right over the whole of the work. Unless otherwise agreed, the rights to the collective work belong to the person who publishes and disseminates it under their name. The duration of rights over a collective work shall be sixty years from the date of its disclosure. Article 28 of the 1996 revision to this law grants collective works protection for 70 years following lawful disclosure of the work.

== Other countries ==
=== Algeria ===
In Algeria a collective work is protected for 50 years from publication, 50 years from the time it was made accessible to the public if unpublished, or 50 years from the time it is realized that it has not been made available to the public within 50 years of creation.

=== China ===
Chinese law is in some ways closer to that of common law countries than to European civil law. It follows the general principle that ownership is originally vested in the author, but makes an exception with collective works. Article 11 of the Chinese copyright code states that when a legal entity or organization directs creation of a work and bears responsibility for the work, that entity is considered the author of the work. All rights vest in the organizational author.

=== Philippines ===
Under the copyright law of the Philippines, a "collective work" is a work which has been created by two or more natural persons at the initiative and under the direction of another with the understanding that it will be disclosed by the latter under his own name and that contributing natural persons will not be identified. When an author contributes to a collective work, his right to have his contribution attributed to him is deemed waived unless he expressly reserves it.

=== Vanuatu ===
In Vanuatu a "collective work" is a work created by two or more individuals at the initiative and under the direction of another person on the understanding that (a) the work will be disclosed by that other person under that person's own name; and (b) the identity of the contributing individuals will not be indicated. The person who initiated and directed the creation of a collective work is the original owner of the economic rights. A "work of joint authorship" is a work created by two or more authors and in which the contribution of each author is not separate from the contribution of the other author or the contributions of the other authors, but does not include a collective work. For a collective work (other than an work of applied art) and an audiovisual work protection extends for 50 years on and after the date on which the work: was made; or first made available to the public; first published; whichever date is the latest.

== Sources ==
- Act No. LXXVI of 1999 on copyright (PDF), Republic of Hungary, 1 January 2007
- Ader, Basile (1997), "La cession des droits d'auteur des journalistes", Legicom (in French), 2 (14), Victoires éditions: 35–41, doi:10.3917/legi.014.0035
- Angelopoulos, Christina (15 September 2012), "The Myth of European Term Harmonisation: 27 Public Domains for the 27 Member States", IViR, archived from the original on 23 February 2017
- Agreement on Trade-Related Aspects of Intellectual Property Rights (PDF), WTO: World Trade Organization
- Alexander, Isabella (2010), Copyright Law and the Public Interest in the Nineteenth Century, Hart Publishing, ISBN 978-1-84113-786-5
- Attribution-NonCommercial 2.0, Creative Commons
- Barrett, Margreth (19 September 2012), Emanuel Law Outlines for Intellectual Property, Wolters Kluwer Law & Business, ISBN 978-1-4548-0431-4
- Bermann, George A.; Picard, Etienne (2008), Introduction to French Law, Kluwer Law International, ISBN 978-90-411-2466-1
- "Bernard Safran: Paintings", safran-arts.com
- Berne Convention for the Protection of Literary and Artistic Works (Paris Text 1971), Cornell University Law School
- Bouche, Nicolas (2011), Intellectual Property Law in France, Kluwer Law International, ISBN 978-90-411-3434-9
- Bretonnière, Jean-François (25 July 2012), "International report - Moral rights in collective works: Supreme Court takes economic view", iam, archived from the original on 9 July 2017
- Bruguiere, Jean-Michel (12 May 2017), "The collective work in the American copyright and the question of its revision by the right holder", L'ACTUALITÉ DDG
- Caenegem, William van (2010), Intellectual Property Law in Australia, Kluwer Law International, ISBN 978-90-411-3300-7
- Copyright Act (R.S.C., 1985, c. C-42) (PDF), Minister of Justice, Canada, 1985
- Copyright and Related Rights Act 2000 (PDF), Republic of Vanuatu, 8 February 2011
- Copyright, Designs and Patents Act 1988, United Kingdom, 1988
- D'Agostino, Giuseppina (1 January 2010), Copyright, Contracts, Creators: New Media, New Rules, Edward Elgar Publishing, ISBN 978-1-84980-520-9
- Ordinance No. 03-05 of 19 Joumada El Oula 1424 corresponding to July 19, 2003, on Copyright and Related Rights, Algeria, Algeria, 1 May 2008
- Engelhardt, Tim; Jaeger, Till, Introduction to Software Protection Under German Law, IFOSS Law Book)
- European Union; Comité des Sages (2011), The New Renaissance, Report of the 'Comité des Sages' Reflection group on bringing Europe's Cultural Heritage online, Brussels: European Union
- "France: Industrial Relations: Copyright Laws and the Status of Journalists", Press Reference
- Goldstein, Paul; Hugenholtz, P. Bernt (6 December 2012), International Copyright: Principles, Law, and Practice, OUP USA, ISBN 978-0-19-979429-4
- Hannemyr, Gisle (11 June 2009), Copyright, etc. terms in Norway (PDF), archived from the original (PDF) on 10 March 2016
- "Literary and Artistic Property" (PDF), Intellectual Property Code, legifrance
- Intellectual Property Code of the Philippines - Part Four, Philippines, 1 January 1998
- Jacobacci Avocats (11 February 2014), "The headache for author employers in French law following the VAN CLEEF & ARPELS and LALIQUE cases", Lexology
- Juan Carlos I (17 November 1987), 25628 LEY 22/1987, de 11 de noviembre de Propiedad Intelectual (in Spanish), Spain
- Law No. 04/L-065 of 30 November 2011, Republic of Kosovo
- Macgillivray, E. J. (1912), The copyright act, 1911, annotated
- Patterson, L. Ray; Joyce, Craig (2003), "Copyright in 1791: An Essay Concerning the Founders' View of Copyright Power Granted to Congress in Article 1. Section 8, Clause 8 of the U.S. Constitution", Emory Law Journal, 52 (1), Emory University School of Law, ISSN 0094-4076
- Spanish Republic, Consolidated Text of the Law on Intellectual Property, Regularizing, Clarifying and Harmonizing the Applicable Statutory Provisions (approved by Royal Legislative Decree No. 1/1996 of April 12, 1996, and amended up to Royal Decree-Law No. 6/2022 of March 29, 2022), Spain (in Spanish)
- Robertson v. Thomson Corp., [2006] 2 SCR 363, 2006 SCC 43 (CanLII), 12 October 2006
- Sainsbury, Maree (2003), Moral Rights and Their Application in Australia, Federation Press, ISBN 978-1-86287-474-9
- Stokes, Simon (30 January 2014), Digital Copyright: Law and Practice, Bloomsbury Publishing, ISBN 978-1-84946-983-8
- Sutherland Asbill & Brennan LLP (2004), Analysis of International Work-for-Hire Laws (PDF)
- Tallmo, Karl-Erik (2014), The History of Copyright: A Critical Overview With Source Texts in Five Languages
- Vaver, David (2011), Intellectual Property Law: Copyright, Patents, Trade-Marks (2nd ed.), Toronto: Irwin Law Inc., ISBN 978-1-55221-209-7
