= Copyright transfer agreement =

Contract to become rightholder of a creative work

A copyright transfer agreement or copyright assignment agreement is an agreement that transfers the copyright for a work from the copyright owner to another party. This is one legal option for publishers and authors of books, magazines, movies, television shows, video games, and other commercial artistic works who want to include and use a work of a second creator: for example, a video game developer who wants to pay an artist to draw a boss to include in a game. Another option is to license the right to include and use the work, rather than transferring the copyright.

In some countries, a transfer of copyright is not legally allowed, and only licensing is possible. In some countries like the United States and the United Kingdom, copyright transfer agreements generally must be in writing and must be signed by the person transferring the copyright. In many countries, if an employee is hired for the purpose of creating a copyrightable work for an employer, that employer is by default the owner of the copyright, so no copyright transfer agreement is necessary. In many countries that recognize the moral rights of creators, those rights cannot be transferred, and copyright transfer agreements only transfer economic rights.

In academic publishing, copyright transfer agreements do not normally involve the payment of remuneration or royalties. Such agreements are a key element of subscription-based academic publishing, and have been said to facilitate the handling of copyright-based permissions in print-only publishing. In the age of electronic communication, the benefits of copyright transfer agreements have been questioned, and while they remain the norm, open licenses as used in open access publishing have been established as an alternative.

== History ==
Copyright transfer agreements became common in the publishing business after the Copyright Act of 1976 in the United States and similar legislation in other countries redefined copyright as accruing to the author from the moment of creation (rather than publication) of a work. This required publishers to acquire copyrights from the author in order to sell the works or access to it, and written statements signed by the rights owner became necessary in order for the copyright transfer to be considered valid.

== Purpose ==
The situation in which authors hold the copyright usually involves considerable effort in the form of correspondence and record keeping and often leads to unnecessary delays. Although this may appear to be trivial for a few requests, a good scholarly journal publishing exciting papers can expect several hundred requests per year; a task of this magnitude can become onerous. On the other hand, if the Journal holds the copyright, requests, value judgements, and permissions can be handled expeditiously to the satisfaction of all concerned.

— J. Lagowski (1982)

Granting publishers the permission to copy, display and distribute the work is necessary for publishers to act as such, and publishing agreements across a wide range of publishers have such provisions. The reach of copyright transfer agreements can go well beyond that, and "[s]ome publishers require that, to the extent possible, copyright be transferred to them." This means that no one, including the authors, can reuse text, tables, or figures in other publications without first getting permission from the new copyright owner.

Copyright transfer agreements also ask that the authors confirm that they actually own the copyright for all the materials pertaining to a given act of publishing, and, in many agreements, that the item for which the copyright is to be transferred has not been previously published and is not under consideration to be published elsewhere, to limit the frequency of duplicate publication and plagiarism.

== Criticisms ==
Critics have said that the copyright transfer agreement in commercial scholarly publishing is "as much about ensuring long–term asset management as it is about providing service to the academic community" because the practice seems to grant favor to the publisher in a way that does not obviously benefit the authors. Copyright transfer agreements often conflict with self-archiving practices or appear to do so due to ambiguous language.

In 2017, the 9th Circuit Court of Appeals in Johnson v. Storix upheld a copyright transfer involving no written assignment. In that case, the Author, Anthony Johnson, sold software as a sole proprietor and incorporated his company in 2003 as Storix, Inc. The court upheld a jury decision that Johnson transferred the copyright to the corporation upon its formation based on an annual report he wrote and signed stating that he had transferred "all assets" from his sole proprietorship. The jury rejected Johnson's claim he intended only to transfer the license to sell the software, and further decided that Johnson became a work for hire upon forming the corporation, thereby also forfeiting all rights to his derivative works. This is the first case in which a document, not itself a contract or agreement and containing no reference to the copyrights, was considered a "note or memorandum" of copyright transfer, and the first time a sole owner of a company was designated a work for hire for copyright ownership purposes. This serves as a lesson that a "writing" required by the Copyright Act need not necessarily be "clear", but may contain ambiguous language which can be interpreted by course of dealing by third parties to the alleged transaction.

=== Prevalence of copyright assignment to publishers ===
Traditional methods of scholarly publishing require complete and exclusive copyright transfer from authors to the publisher, typically as a precondition for publication. This process transfers control and ownership over dissemination and reproduction from authors as creators to publishers as disseminators, with the latter then able to monetise the process. The transfer and ownership of copyright represents a delicate tension between protecting the rights of authors, and the interests – financial as well as reputational – of publishers and institutes. With OA publishing, typically authors retain copyright to their work, and articles and other outputs are granted a variety of licenses depending on the type.

The timing of the process of rights transfer is in itself problematic for several reasons. Firstly, copyright transfer usually being conditional for publication means that it is rarely freely transferred or acquired without pressure. Secondly, it becomes very difficult for an author to not sign a copyright transfer agreement, due to the association of publication with career progression (publish or perish/publication pressure), and the time potentially wasted should the review and publication process have to be started afresh. There are power dynamics at play that do not benefit authors, and instead often compromise certain academic freedoms. This might in part explain why authors in scientific research, in contrast to all other industries where original creators get honoraria or royalties, typically do not receive any payments from publishers at all. It also explains why many authors seem to continue to sign away their rights while simultaneously disagreeing with the rationale behind doing so.

It remains unclear if such copyright transfer is generally permissible. Research funders or institutes, public museums or art galleries might have over-ruling policies that state that copyright over research, content, intellectual property, employs or funds is not allowed to be transferred to third parties, commercial or otherwise. Usually a single author is signing on behalf of all authors, perhaps without their awareness or permission. The full understanding of copyright transfer agreements requires a firm grasp of "legal speak" and copyright law, in an increasingly complex licensing and copyright landscape, (Note: "Seven Things Every Scholarly Publisher Should Know about Researchers". 2016-08-30., Alice Meadows and Karin Wulf, The Scholarly Kitchen. (2016)) (Note: "Guest Post — Academics and Copyright Ownership: Ignorant, Confused or Misled?". 2017-10-31., Elizabeth Gadd, The Scholarly Kitchen. (2017)) and for which a steep learning curve for librarians and researchers exists. Thus, in many cases, authors might not even have the legal rights to transfer full rights to publishers, or agreements have been amended to make full texts available on repositories or archives, regardless of the subsequent publishing contract.

This amounts to a fundamental discord between the purpose of copyright (i.e., to grant full choice to an author/creator over dissemination of works) and the application of it, because authors lose these rights during copyright transfer. Such fundamental conceptual violations are emphasised by the popular use of sites such as ResearchGate and Sci-Hub for illicit file sharing by academics and the wider public. Factually, widespread, unrestricted sharing helps to advance science faster than paywalled articles, thus it can be argued that copyright transfer does a fundamental disservice to the entire research enterprise. It is also highly counter-intuitive when learned societies such as the American Psychological Association actively monitor and remove copyrighted content they publish on behalf of authors, (Note: "Monitoring of Unauthorized Internet Posting of Journal Articles"., American Psychological Association.) as this is seen as not being in the best interests of either authors or the reusability of published research and a sign of the system of copyright transfer being counterproductive (because original creators lose all control over, and rights to, their own works).

Some commercial publishers, such as Elsevier, engage in "nominal copyright" where they require full and exclusive rights transfer from authors to the publisher for OA articles, while the copyright in name stays with the authors. The assumption that this practice is a condition for publication is misleading, since even works that are in the public domain can be repurposed, printed, and disseminated by publishers. Authors can instead grant a simple non-exclusive license to publish that fulfils the same criteria. However, according to a survey from Taylor and Francis in 2013, almost half of researchers surveyed answered that they would still be content with copyright transfer for OA articles.

Therefore, critics argue that in scientific research, copyright is largely ineffective in its proposed use, but also wrongfully acquired in many cases, and goes practically against its fundamental intended purpose of helping to protect authors and further scientific research. Plan S requires that authors and their respective institutes retain copyright to articles without transferring them to publishers; something also supported by OA2020. (Note: "Final conference statement"., Berlin 14th Open Access conference.) Researchers failed to find proof that copyright transfer is required for publication, or any case where a publisher has exercised copyright in the best interest of the authors. While one argument of publishers in favor of copyright transfer might be that it enables them to defend authors against any copyright infringements, publishers can take on this responsibility even when copyright stays with the author, as is the policy of the Royal Society.

== Other models ==
Copyright transfer agreements are one way to govern permissions based on copyright. Since the advent of digital publishing, various commentators have pointed out the benefits of author-retained copyright, and publishers have started to implement it using license agreements, wherein the author of the work retains copyright and gives the publisher the permission (exclusive or not) to reproduce and distribute the work. A third model is the so-called "browse-wrap" or "click-wrap" license model that is becoming more and more popular in the form of the Creative Commons licenses: it allows anyone (including the publisher) to reproduce and distribute the work, with some possible restrictions. Creative Commons licenses are used by many open access journals. NFTs can allow the transfer of copyright in the asset by way of the metadata on the blockchain.

== Author addenda ==
Copyright transfer agreements are usually prepared by the publisher, and some print journals include a copy of the statement in every issue they published. If authors wish to deviate from the default phrasing – e.g., if they want to retain copyright or would not like to grant the publisher an exclusive right to publish – they can specify desired modifications, either by editing the document directly or by attaching an addendum to a copy of the default version. Publisher policies on the acceptance of such addenda vary, though. Some institutions offer instructions and assistance for staff in creating such addenda.

== See also ==
- Berne Convention for the Protection of Literary and Artistic Works
- Committee on Publication Ethics
- ETBLAST
- Fair use
- Fraud
- Intellectual property
- Scientific misconduct
