= Copyright Act of 1976 =

United States law

- Long title: An Act for the general revision of the Copyright Law, title 17 of the United States Code, and for other purposes
- Enacted by: the 94th United States Congress
- Effective: January 1, 1978

Citations
- Public law: Pub. L. 94–553
- Statutes at Large: 90 Stat. 2541

Codification
- Acts amended: Copyright Act of 1909
- Titles amended: 17 (Copyright)
- U.S.C. sections created: 17 U.S.C. §§ 101-810
- U.S.C. sections amended: 44 U.S.C. §§ 505, 2113; 18 U.S.C. § 2318

Legislative history
- Introduced in the United States Senate as S.22 by John Little McClellan (D–AR) on January 15, 1975; Committee consideration by House Judiciary Committee (Subcommittee on Courts, Civil Liberties, and the Administration of Justice); Senate Judiciary Committee; Passed the Senate on February 19, 1976 (97-0); Passed the House on September 30, 1976 (316-7); Reported by the joint conference committee on September 29, 1976; agreed to by the Senate on September 30, 1976 and by the House on September 30, 1976; Signed into law by President Gerald Ford on October 19, 1976

Major amendments
- Berne Convention Implementation Act of 1988; Visual Artists Rights Act; Copyright Renewal Act of 1992; Audio Home Recording Act; No Electronic Theft Act; Copyright Term Extension Act; Digital Millennium Copyright Act; Work Made for Hire and Copyright Corrections Act of 2000; Family Entertainment and Copyright Act; Unlocking Consumer Choice and Wireless Competition Act; Music Modernization Act; Copyright Alternative in Small-Claims Enforcement Act of 2020

The Copyright Act of 1976 is a United States copyright law and remains the primary basis of copyright law in the United States, as amended by several later enacted copyright provisions. The Act spells out the basic rights of copyright holders, codified the doctrine of "fair use", and for most new copyrights adopted a unitary term based on the date of the author's death rather than the prior scheme of fixed initial and renewal terms. It became Public Law number 94-553 on October 19, 1976; most parts of the law went into effect on January 1, 1978.

U.S. Register of Copyrights Barbara Ringer and Congressman Robert Kastenmeier took central roles in drafting the statute.

== History and purpose ==
Before the 1976 Act, the last major revision to statutory copyright law in the United States occurred in 1909. In deliberating the Act, Congress noted that extensive technological advances had occurred since the adoption of the 1909 Act. Television, motion pictures, sound recordings, and radio were cited as examples. The Act was designed in part to address intellectual property questions raised by these new forms of communication. Barbara Ringer, who later became US Register of Copyrights in 1973, began taking an active role in advocating for and drafting a new copyright act, particularly to protect the rights of authors with the advent of new technologies.

Aside from advances in technology, the other main impetus behind the adoption of the 1976 Act was the development of and the United States' participation in the Universal Copyright Convention (UCC) (and its anticipated participation in the Berne Convention). While the U.S. became a party to the UCC in 1955, Congress passed Public Law 743 in order to modify copyright law to conform to the Convention's standards.

In the years following the United States' adoption of the UCC, Congress commissioned multiple studies on a general revision of copyright law, culminating in a published report in 1961. A draft of the bill was introduced in both the House and Senate in 1964, but the original version of the Act was revised multiple times between 1964 and 1976. The bill was passed as S. 22 of the 94th Congress by a vote of 97–0 in the Senate on February 19, 1976. S. 22 was passed by a vote of 316–7 in the House of Representatives on September 22, 1976. The final version was adopted as title 17 of the United States Code on October 19, 1976, when President Gerald Ford signed it into law. The law went into effect on January 1, 1978. At the time, the law was considered to be a fair compromise between publishers' and authors' rights.

Ringer called the new law "a balanced compromise that comes down on the authors' and creators' side in almost every instance." The law was almost exclusively discussed in publishers' and librarians' journals, with little discussion in the mainstream press. The claimed advantage of the law's extension of the term of subsisting copyrights was that "royalties will be paid to widows and heirs for an extra 19 years for such about-to-expire copyrights as those on Sherwood Anderson's Winesburg, Ohio". The other intent of the extension was to protect authors' rights "for life plus 50 years—the most common term internationally and the one [Mark] Twain fought for in his lifetime". Further extensions of both term and scope had been desired by some, as outlined in a Time article.

== Significant portions of the Act ==
The 1976 Act, through its terms, displaces all previous copyright laws in the United States insofar as those laws conflict with the Act. Those include prior federal legislation, such as the Copyright Act of 1909, and extend to all relevant common law and state copyright laws.

=== Subject matter of copyright ===
Under section 102 of the Act, copyright protection extends to "original works of authorship fixed in any tangible medium of expression, now known or later developed, from which they can be perceived, reproduced, or otherwise communicated, either directly or with the aid of a machine or device". The Act defines "works of authorship" as any of the following:

1. literary works,
2. musical works, including any accompanying words,
3. dramatic works, including any accompanying music,
4. pantomimes and choreographic works,
5. pictorial, graphic, and sculptural works,
6. motion pictures and other audiovisual works, and
7. sound recordings.

An eighth category, architectural works, was added in 1990.

The wording of section 102 is significant mainly because it effectuated a major change in the mode of United States copyright protection. Under the last major statutory revision to U.S. copyright law, the Copyright Act of 1909, federal statutory copyright protection attached to original works only when those works were 1) published and 2) had a notice of copyright affixed. State copyright law governed protection for unpublished works before the adoption of the 1976 Act, but published works, whether containing a notice of copyright or not, were governed exclusively by federal law. If no notice of copyright was affixed to a work and the work was, in fact, "published" in a legal sense, the 1909 Act provided no copyright protection and the work became part of the public domain. Under the 1976 Act, however, section 102 says that copyright protection extends to original works that are fixed in a tangible medium of expression. Thus, the 1976 Act broadened the scope of federal statutory copyright protection from "published" works to works that are "fixed".

Section 102(b) excludes several categories from copyright protection, partly codifying the concept of idea–expression distinction from Baker v. Selden. It requires that "in no case does copyright protection for an original work of authorship extend to any idea, procedure, process, system, method of operation, concept, principle, or discovery, regardless of the form in which it is described, explained, illustrated, or embodied in such work."

==== Sound recordings and musical compositions ====
There are separate copyright protections for musical compositions and sound recordings. Composition copyright includes lyrics and unless self-published, is usually transferred under the terms of a publishing contract. Many record companies will also require that sound recording copyright be transferred to them as part of the terms of an album release; however, the owner of the composition copyright is not always the same as the owner of the sound recording copyright.

=== Exclusive rights ===
Section 106 granted five exclusive rights to copyright holders, all of which are subject to the remaining sections in chapter 1 (currently, sections 107–122):

1. the right to reproduce (copy) the work into copies and phonorecords,
2. the right to create derivative works of the original work,
3. the right to distribute copies and phonorecords of the work to the public by sale, lease, or rental,
4. the right to perform the work publicly (if the work is a literary, musical, dramatic, choreographic, pantomime, motion picture, or other audiovisual work), and
5. the right to display the work publicly (if the work is a literary, musical, dramatic, choreographic, pantomime, pictorial, graphic, sculptural, motion picture, or other audiovisual work).

==== Reproduction, adaptation, and distribution ====
The first three enumerated rights apply to all kinds of copyrighted works and have been "characterized as rights of copying, recording, adaptation, and publishing." The reproduction right encompasses the right to create a new fixation of a work, i.e. any material object in which its embodiment is "sufficiently permanent or stable to permit it to be perceived, reproduced, or otherwise communicated for a period of more than transitory duration." Visually perceptible "copies" and "phonorecords" both fall under the reproduction right, and the right is implicated when a work is copied "in whole or in any substantial part," and when a work is imitated rather than duplicated exactly.

The term derivative work was coined in the early 1960s, during the early stages of the copyright law revision process, to unify the provisions of the 1909 Act specifying (1) the types of adaptations of an existing work that should be eligible for their own copyright protection and (2) the types of adaptations that should require permission from the copyright owner of the existing work.

A 1963 draft bill defined the term "derivative work" within the subject-matter provision clarifying that such adaptations were eligible for copyright as long as they were original. However, it subsumed the adaptation right under the reproduction right, conceived of as a broad right to make copies or recordings of a work, including "translations, adaptations and other derivative works." However, a subsequent draft in 1964 reintroduced the derivative work right as a separate right to make clear that adaptation, and not just verbatim copying, is within the scope of the author's exclusive rights. The same definition of "derivative work" was used to specify both the scope of the derivative work right and what types of transformations of existing works were eligible for independent copyright protection.

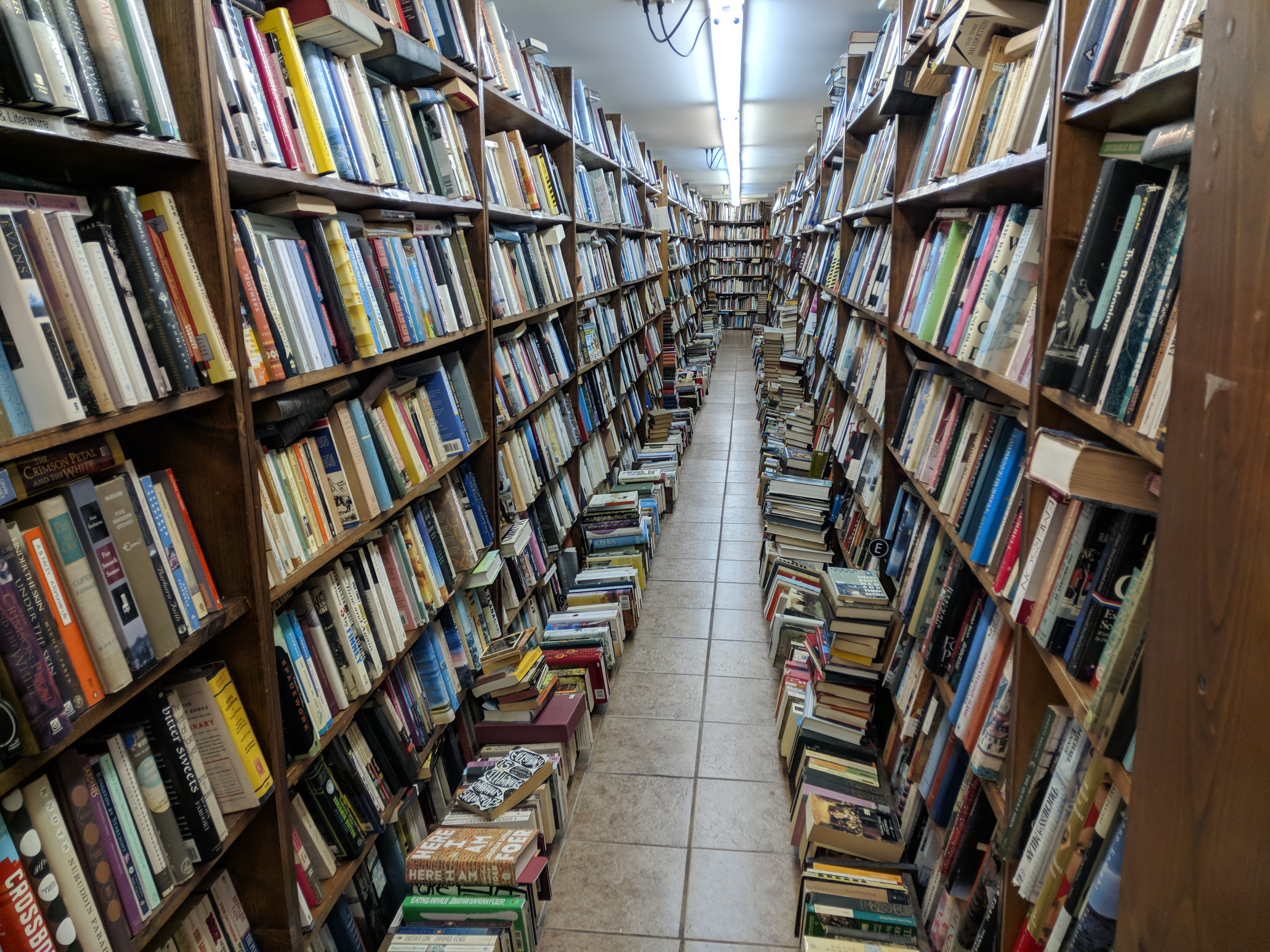
The first-sale doctrine allows persons other than the copyright owner, such as this used bookstore, to resell copies of works.

The relationship between the reproduction right and the derivative work right has been the subject of debate. The House Report accompanying the 1976 Act clarifies that "wide departures or variations from the copyrighted work would still be an infringement" of the reproduction right provided that a portion of the copyrightable expression in the work is reproduced and not just the ideas. However, Rebecca Tushnet has argued that non-literal copying should implicate the derivative work right, whereas the reproduction right should be limited to "exact or near-exact copying."

The distribution right encompasses the author's right to control the first publication of a work. The first-sale doctrine limits the scope of this right: once the copyright owner has parted with ownership of a particular copy or phonorecord of a work, the present owner of that item is free to sell, give away, or otherwise dispose of it. However, distribution of infringing copies or phonorecords would be an infringement of the distribution right. Reselling stolen copies of the work would likewise be an infringement. More generally, merely possessing a copy of a work acquired through rental, lease, or lending does not give the person in possession of it the right to distribute or dispose of it.

==== Public performance and display ====
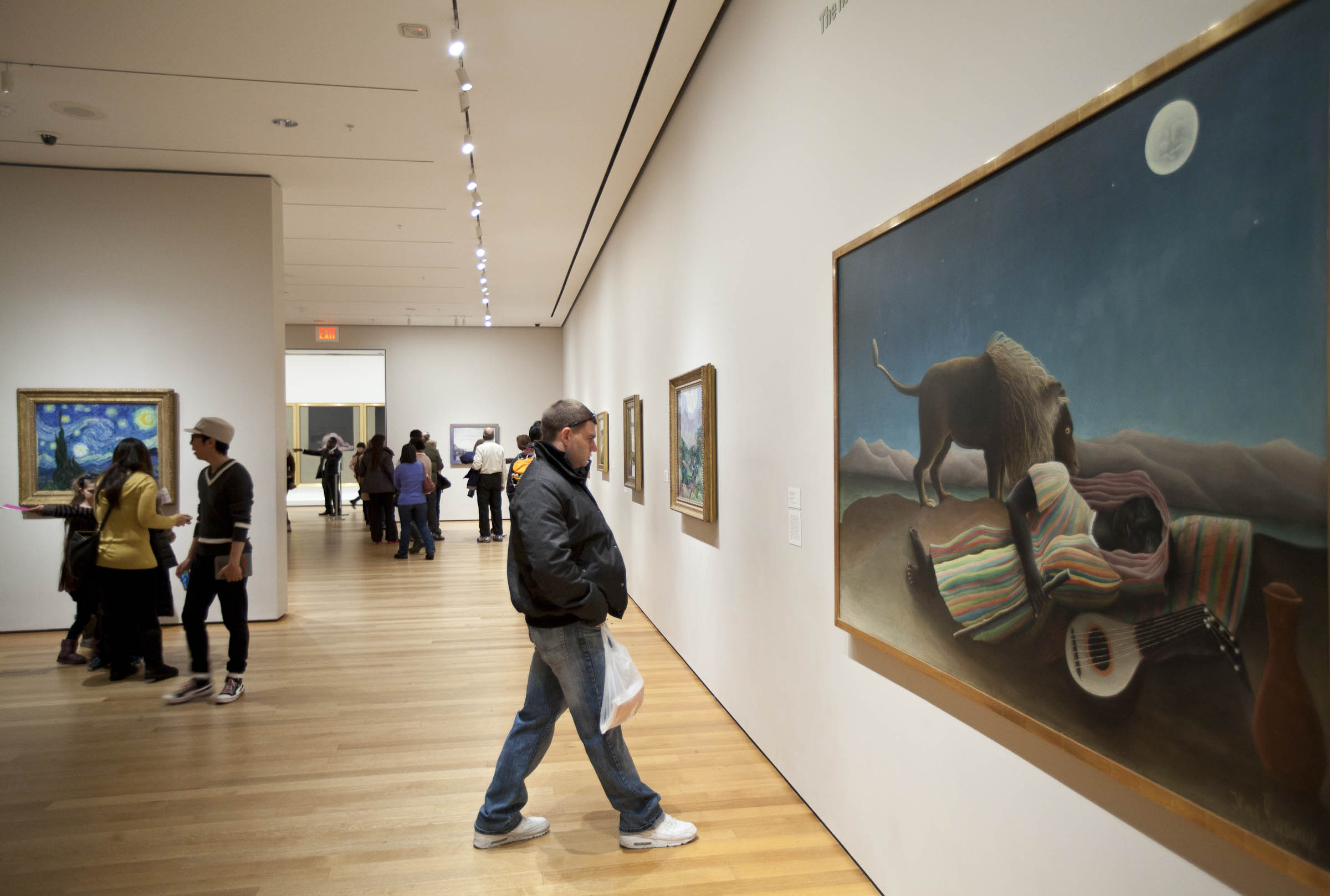
Exhibition of copyrighted artwork in a gallery generally does not infringe the public display right. (The paintings in this photograph are in the public domain.)

The public performance and public display rights both encompass transmissions of a copyrighted work to members of the public via telecommunication technologies such as radio and television broadcasts and the Internet. The public display right was introduced to cover transmissions of works that were not covered by the public performance right, particularly pictorial, graphic, and sculptural works. Under 17 U.S.C. § 109(c), public displays of a copyrighted work by the owner of a copy "to viewers present at the place where the copy is located" are exempt from the copyright owner's exclusive right. Thus, for example, an art gallery could display a copyrighted painting to viewers at the gallery without infringing this right, but it would be an infringement to transmit an image of the painting to members of the public located elsewhere.

A sixth exclusive right was later included in 1995 by the Digital Performance Right in Sound Recordings Act: the right to perform a sound recording publicly by means of digital audio transmission.

=== Fair use ===
Additionally, the fair use defense to copyright infringement was codified for the first time in section 107 of the 1976 Act. Fair use was not a novel proposition in 1976, however, as federal courts had been using a common law form of the doctrine since the 1840s (an English version of fair use appeared much earlier). The Act codified this common law doctrine with little modification. Under section 107, the fair use of a copyrighted work is not copyright infringement, even if such use technically violates section 106. While fair use explicitly applies to use of copyrighted work for criticism, news reporting, teaching, scholarship, or research purposes, the defense is not limited to these areas. The Act gives four factors to be considered to determine whether a particular use is a fair use:

1. the purpose and character of the use (commercial or educational, trans-formative or reproductive, political);
2. the nature of the copyrighted work (fictional or factual, the degree of creativity);
3. the amount and substantiality of the portion of the original work used; and
4. the effect of the use upon the market (or potential market) for the original work.

The Act was later amended to extend the fair use defense to unpublished works.

=== Compulsory licenses ===
The Copyright Act of 1976 included provisions for four types of compulsory licenses:

- Section 111 established a compulsory license of certain cable television retransmissions of over-the-air broadcasts permitted under FCC regulations.
- Section 115 provides for a compulsory mechanical license to make and distribute phonorecords of copyrighted nondramatic musical works.
- Section 116 replaced the 1909 Act's "jukebox exemption" with a statutory license for the public performance of nondramatic musical works via "coin-operated phonorecord players".
- Section 118 established a compulsory license for public broadcasters to use published nondramatic musical works and published pictorial, graphic, and sculptural works in the course of certain non-commercial broadcasting activities, but also encourages them to negotiate voluntary licenses without incurring antitrust liability.

The Act also established a Copyright Royalty Commission "for the purpose of periodically reviewing and adjusting statutory royalty rates for use of copyrighted materials" under these four categories of compulsory licenses. The system was ultimately replaced by the present Copyright Royalty Board under the Copyright Royalty and Distribution Reform Act of 2004.

The statute was later amended, by the Digital Performance Right in Sound Recordings Act in 1995 and Title IV of the DMCA in 1998, to establish compulsory licenses under sections 112 and 114 for non-interactive digital transmissions of sound recordings.

=== Term of protection ===
Expansion of U.S. copyright law (assuming authors create their works at age 35 and die at age 70).

Previous copyright law set the duration of copyright protection at 28 years with a possibility of a 28 year extension, for a total maximum term of 56 years. The 1976 Act, however, substantially increased the term of protection. Section 302 of the Act extended protection to "a term consisting of the life of the author and fifty years after the author's death". In addition, the Act created a static 75-year term (dated from the date of publication) for anonymous works, pseudonymous works, and works made for hire. Under section 304, the extension term for works copyrighted before 1978 that had not already entered the public domain was increased from 28 years to 47 years, giving a total term of 75 years.

In 1998, the Copyright Term Extension Act further extended copyright protection to the duration of the author's life plus 70 years for general copyrights and to 95 years from date of publication or 120 years from date of creation, whichever comes first, for works made for hire. Works copyrighted before 1978 have a duration of protection that depends on a variety of factors.

=== Transfer of copyright ===
Section 204 of the Act governs the transfer of ownership of copyrights. The section requires a copyright holder to sign a written instrument of conveyance that expressly transfers ownership of the copyright to the intended recipient for a transfer to be effective. Prior case law on this issue was conflicting, with some cases espousing a rule similar to section 204 and others reaching a quite different conclusion.

In the 1942 New York case Pushman v. New York Graphic Society, for example, the court held that although a copyright in a work is distinct from a property right in a copy of the work, where the only existing copy of the work is transferred, the copyright is transferred along with the copy, unless expressly withheld by the author. Section 202 of the 1976 Act retains the property right/copyright distinction, but section 204 eliminates the inconsistent common law by assuming that the copyright is withheld by the author unless it is expressly transferred.

The Act also codified the ability for writers and other artists who transfer or license their copyrights to others to act on termination rights, other than for works made for hire, 35 years after the publication of the work. This was intended to allow these people to renegotiate licensing or transfer agreements at the later period if the value of the work was not apparent at the time of creation. The law requires the creator to issue notice of termination at least 2 years prior to the 35-year date, giving the rights holder time to prepare. Terminations of grants executed on or after January 1, 1978, are governed by section 203 of the Act, while terminations of pre-1978 are governed by section 304, preserving authors' rights under the old renewal system.

In 1999, the Intellectual Property and Communications Omnibus Reform Act of 1999 was enacted, amending the definition of works made for hire in the Act to explicitly include sound recordings, thus barring recording artists from exercising their termination rights. However, less than a year later, the Work Made for Hire and Copyright Corrections Act of 2000 was enacted, restoring the definition to the status quo in the 1976 Act where sound recordings were not mentioned as a category of works made for hire.

=== Registration and deposit ===
According to section 408 of the Act, registration of a work with the Copyright Office is not a prerequisite for copyright protection. The Act does, however, allow for registration, and gives the Copyright Office the power to promulgate the necessary forms. Aside from Copyright Office paperwork, the Act requires only that one copy, or two copies if the work has been published, be deposited with the Office to accomplish registration. Though registration is not required for copyright protection to attach to a work, section 411 of the Act does require registration before a copyright infringement action by the creator of the work can proceed. Even if registration is denied, however, an infringement action can continue if the creator of the work joins the Copyright Office as a defendant, requiring the court to determine the copyrightability of the work before addressing the issue of infringement.

Section 407 of the Act, which required authors and publishers to deposit a copy of each work with the Library of Congress but did not grant copyright protection, was determined to be unconstitutional in Valancourt Books v. Garland.

== Industry-specific provisions ==
=== Music industry ===
The 1976 Act revised and clarified the existing compulsory license for mechanical reproductions of copyrighted nondramatic musical works.Additionally, the Intellectual Property and Communications Omnibus Reform Act of 1999 defined sound recordings as eligible works made for hire, but those provisions were effectively abrogated by the Work Made for Hire and Copyright Corrections Act of 2000, which reversed the 1999 amendment.

=== Broadcasting ===
The Copyright Act of 1976 also contained a number of provisions specific to the broadcasting industry, including public broadcasting entities. First, it extended copyright protection to live broadcasts such as news and sports programs by stipulating that the sounds and images being transmitted are considered "fixed" for the purposes of copyright as long as the program is being recorded and transmitted simultaneously.

== Legacy ==
=== Impact on internet radio ===
Streaming music on a portable device is mainstream today, but digital radio and music streaming websites such as Pandora are fighting an uphill battle when it comes to copyright protection. 17 USC 801(b)(1)(D) of the Copyright Act states that Copyright Royalty Judges should "minimize any disruptive impact on the structure of the industries involved and on generally prevailing industry practices". "Much of the initial drafting of the '76 Act was by the Copyright Office, which chaired a series of meetings with prominent industry copyright lawyers throughout the 1960s". Some believe that Section 106 was designed with the intent to maximize litigation to the benefit of the legal industry, and gives too much power and protection to the copyright holder while weakening fair use.

Critics of the Copyright Act say that Pandora will never be profitable if something does not change because "services like Pandora already pay over 60 percent of their revenue in licensing fees while others pay far less for delivering the same service. As a result, services like Pandora have been unable to see profitability and sustainability is already in question." An increase in subscription fees would likely be an end to Pandora's business.

=== Impacts of termination rights ===
The termination right clause only started taking effect in 2013, with notably Victor Willis terminating rights on the songs he had written for The Village People. A lawsuit resulted from this action Scorpio Music, et al. v. Willis in 2012 (after Willis had filed notice of termination to Scorpio Music, the music distributor, and which the court upheld Willis' termination rights). Subsequently, other songwriters began seeking termination rights. This has also become an issue in the film industry, as the rights to many iconic 1980s film franchises are being terminated by their original writers, such as by the family of Roderick Thorp whose novel Nothing Lasts Forever was adapted into Die Hard.

=== Impact on innovation ===
One of the functions of the Copyright Royalty Judges defined by the Copyright Act is to "minimize any disruptive impact on the structure of the industries involved and on generally prevailing industry practices". Critics of the law have questioned this aspect of it, as it discourages innovation and perpetuates older businesses.

== See also ==
- United States copyright law
- Digital Millennium Copyright Act
- Copyright Term Extension Act
- Music Modernization Act
