= List of Cosmos Club members =

The Cosmos Club is a private social club in Washington, D.C., that was founded in 1878. Following is an incomplete list of its notable members.

Name	Class and range	Notability	Reference
Cleveland Abbe	1883–1884	professor of meteorology with the U.S. Weather Bureau	
Cleveland Abbe Jr.	1895–1899	professor of geography and biology at Western Maryland College	
Truman Abbe	1903	surgeon	
Philip Abelson	1953	physicist	
Henry Adams	1878	historian and Pulitzer Prize recipient	
Henry Carter Adams	1889	professor of political economy at the University of Michigan	
James Truslow Adams		writer, historian, and Pulitzer Prize winner	
Leason Adams		geophysicist and researcher at the Carnegie Institute	
Alvey A. Adee	1887–1889	United States Secretary of State	
Jesse C. Adkins		judge of the United States District Court for the District of Columbia	
Cyrus Adler	1890	Educator, librarian	
Fred C. Ainsworth	1887–1888	U.S. Army surgeon and adjutant general	
Clyde Bruce Aitchison		Interstate Commerce Commissioner	
Charles Henry Alden	1893–1897	first president of the Army Medical School	
Asa O. Aldis	1880–1884	Judge and diplomat	
John Merton Aldrich		associate curator of insects at the United States National Museum	
Dean C. Allard		naval historian, archivist, director of the United States Navy's Naval Historical Center	
Charles Herbert Allen	1888–1890	Governor of Puerto Rico, Assistant Secretary of the Navy, member of Congress	
Eugene Thomas Allen		pioneer of geochemistry, worked at the Geophysical Laboratory of the Carnegie Institution	
Harvey J. Alter	1970	medical researcher, co-winner of the Nobel Prize in Physiology or Medicine	
Benjamin Alvord	1878	mathematician, soldier, U.S. Army paymaster	
Henry Elijah Alvord	1895	Professor of agriculture, chief of the dairy division of the U.S. Department of Agriculture	
Nicholas Longworth Anderson	1886–1887	U.S. Army brigadier general and major general of volunteers	
Eliphalet F. Andrews	1880–1896	painter, director of the Corcoran School of Art	
Lincoln Clark Andrews		U.S. Army brigadier general, Assistant Secretary of the Treasury	
Earl C. Arnold		attorney, academic, college administrator	
William Harris Ashmead	1892	Entomologist, assistant curator Smithsonian	
John Vincent Atanasoff	1957	computer pioneer, built the first digital computer	
Wilbur Olin Atwater	1899	professor of chemistry, U.S. Department of Agriculture nutritionist	
Albert William Atwood	1928	author, journalist, and writer for National Geographic and The Saturday Evening Post	
James Percy Ault		Geodetic surveyor, geophysicist, geomagnetic researcher	
Louis Winslow Austin		Physicist U.S. Bureau of Standards	
Michael Auslin		writer	
Cyrus Cates Babb	1892	civil engineer and hydrographer with U.S. Geological Survey	
Ernest Adna Back		Entomologist, U.S. Department of Agriculture	
Henry Bacon	1888	architect	
Barbara A. Bailar	1988	mathematical statistician; executive director of the American Statistical Association	
Jennings Bailey		judge of the United States District Court for the District of Columbia	
Vernon Orlando Bailey		Mammologist with the Bureau of Biological Survey, United States Department of Agriculture	
H. Foster Bain		geologist, director of the U.S. Bureau of Mines.	
George Washington Baird	1895	Chief engineer and rear admiral in the U.S. Navy	
Spencer Fullerton Baird	1878	ornithologist, ichthyologist, herpetologist, first curator and Secretary of the Smithsonian	
Marcellus Bailey	1878–1885, 1866–1890	patent lawyer	
Frank Baker	1882	physician and superintendent of the National Zoo	
Marcus Baker	1884	cartographer with U. S. Geological Survey; assistant secretary of Carnegie Institution	
Aram Bakshian Jr.		Author and speechwriter for three presidents	
Albertus H. Baldwin	1899	commissioner U.S. Tariff Commission	
Carleton Roy Ball		botanist, in charge of the U.S. Bureau of Plant Industry	
John Chandler Bancroft	1890–1898	sculptor	
Orion M. Barber		politician and associate judge of the United States Court of Customs and Patent Appeals	
Edward Chester Barnard	1899	topographer, U.S. Geological Survey; chief topographer, U.S. and Canada boundary survey	
Job Barnard	1903	associate justice of the U.S. Supreme Court	
John Russell Bartlett	1886–1897	oceanographer and U.S. Navy Admiral	
Paul Wayland Bartlett	1914	sculptor	
Henry Askew Barton		first director of the American Institute of Physics	
Paul Bartsch		malacologist, carcinologist, curator of the division of mollusks U.S. National Museum	
Carl Barus	1885–1895	physicist with U.S. Geological Survey and Smithsonian Institution, professor at Brown University	
Ray S. Bassler		geologist and paleontologist with the U.S. National Museum	
Frederick John Bates		physicist, chief of polarimetric and carbohydrate section, Bureau of Standards; supervisor of the Government Sugar Laboratories, Treasury Department	
Newton Lemuel. Bates	1878–1881, 1884	surgeon general of the U.S. Navy	
Louis Agricola Bauer	1899	geophysicist, chief of the terrestrial magnetism division of the United States Coast and Geodetic Survey.	
Nathan D. Baxter		bishop of the Episcopal Church	
Clifton Bailey Beach	1896	member of the U.S. Congress	
George Ferdinand Becker	1890	geologist with the U.S. Geological Survey	
George Beadle		geneticist who won the Nobel Prize in Physiology or Medicine	
Truxtun Beale	1902	diplomat	
Tarleton Hoffman Bean	1883	ichthyologist, curator of the department of fishes at the Smithsonian Institution	
Thomas M. Beggs	1955	painter	
Alexander Graham Bell	1880	scientist, engineer, and inventor of the first telephone; president, National Geographic Society	
Charles J. Bell	1883	co-founder of the National Geographic Society, secretary of the Bell Telephone Company	
Chichester Bell	1881–1887	chemist and inventor	
Samuel Flagg Bemis		historian, biographer, professor of history at George Washington University	
Marcus Benjamin	1896	chemist, editor for the U.S. National Museum	
Charles Bendire	1888	ornithologist, captain of infantry in the U.S. Army	
Arden L. Bement Jr.	1980	engineer, scientist, professor at Purdue University, director of the National Science Foundation	
Andrew H. Berding		journalist, United States Assistant Secretary of State for Public Affairs	
Patricia Wilson Berger		librarian, president of the American Library Association	
Emil Bessels	1878	zoologist, entomologist, and arctic researcher with the Smithsonian Institution	
John M. Bevan		university professor	
Albert Burnley Bibb	1892–1899	architect with United States Life-Savings Service, professor of architecture at Catholic University	
Ernest Percy Bicknell		director of the American Red Cross	
Julius Bien	1885	artist, publisher, lithographer	
Frank Hagar Bigelow	1890	professor of meteorology with the U.S. Weather Bureau	
John Bigelow Jr.		U.S. Army lieutenant colonel, teacher at MIT, superintendent of Yosemite National Park	
John Shaw Billings	1878	librarian of the New York Public Library, deputy of the US Army Surgeon General	
Henry H. Bingham	1881–1889	Congressman from Pennsylvania	
Theodore A. Bingham	1897–1898	U.S. Army General, superintendent of the public buildings and grounds at Washington	
Claude Hale Birdseye		chief topographic engraver, U.S. Geological Survey	
Rogers Birnie	1886	co-founder of National Geographic Society, United States Army officer, explorer of Death Valley	
William Herbert Bixby		U.S. Army brigadier general	
Henry Campbell Black	1892	lawyer, founder of Black's Law Dictionary	
William Murray Black	1897–1898	Commissioner of the District of Columbia, chief of the U.S. Army Corps of Engineers	
Harry Blackmun		U.S. Supreme Court Justice	
James P. Blair	1998	photographer with National Geographic	
William Bodde Jr.		U.S. Ambassador to the Marshall Islands, Fiji, Tonga, Tuvalu, and Kiribati	
Ernest L. Bogart		economist and academic, president of the American Economic Association	
Henry Carrington Bolton	1888	chemist	
Robert Whitney Bolwell		professor at George Washington University, pioneer of American studies	
Stephen Bonsal		journalist, war correspondent, author, and diplomat, won the Pulitzer Prize for History	
Daniel J. Boorstin		Librarian of Congress and winner of the Pulitzer Prize	
William A. Boring	1901	architect	
Clement Lincoln Bouvé		attorney, Register of Copyrights in the United States Copyright Office	
John Wesley Bovee	1902	gynecology professor at George Washington University, founder American College of Surgeons	
Adam Giede Böving		entomologist and zoologist, U.S. National Museum	
Norman L. Bowen		geologist, Geophysical Laboratory, Carnegie Institution of Washington	
William Bowie		geodetic engineer, chief of the division of geodesy, United States Coast and Geodetic Survey	
Francis Tiffany Bowles	1882–1901	chief naval constructor and youngest Rear Admiral in the history of the U.S. Navy	
Alpheus Henry Bowman		brigadier general U.S. Army	
George Lothrop Bradley	1883	artist	
Frank B. Brady		engineer, executive director of the Institute of Navigation	
Charles John Brand		chief of the Bureau of Markets at the United States Department of Agriculture	
Louis Brandeis	1915–1932	U.S. Supreme Court Justice	
Gregory Breit		Mathematical physicist, academic	
Lyman James Briggs		Physicist and engineer	
David Brinkley		journalist	
Alfred Hulse Brooks	1895	geologist with the U.S. Geological Survey	
Glenn Brown	1888	architect	
Henry Billings Brown	1897	U.S. Supreme Court Justice	
Joseph Stanley Brown	1881–1885, 1894	assistant geologist, U. S. Geological Survey; private secretary to President James A. Garfield	
Lester R. Brown		environmental analyst	
Stimson Joseph Brown	1900	professor of mathematics, astronomical director of the United States Naval Observatory	
John Mills Browne	1883–1884	surgeon general of the U.S. Navy	
Arnold W. Brunner	1902	Architect and historian	
Kirk Bryan		Geologist, U.S. Geological Survey, professor at Harvard University	
Wilhelmus Bogart Bryan		journalist, author, editor of The Washington Star	
Albert H. Bumstead		cartographer	
William E. Bunney Jr.	1982	Psychiatrist, academic	
Horatio C. Burchard	1879–1886	director of the U.S. Mint, congressman, father of the consumer price index	
George K. Burgess		physicist	
Swan Moses Burnett	1879	surgeon, pioneering ophthalmologist at the Georgetown University School of Medicine	
Arthur F. Burns		economist, U.S. Ambassador to West Germany	
Vannevar Bush		electrical engineer	
Henry Kirke Bush-Brown		sculptor	
Charles Henry Butler		lawyer, reporter of decisions of the United States Supreme Court	
Robert W. Cairns	1954	chemist, executive director of the American Chemical Society	
Edgar B. Calvert		Principal meteorologist and chief of the Forecast Division, U.S. Weather Bureau	
Charles R. Cameron		U.S. Foreign Service	
Frank Kenneth Cameron	1895	soil chemist with U.S. Department of Agriculture, professor at University of North Carolina	
Edward Kernan Campbell		chief judge of the Court of Claims	
Marius Robinson Campbell	1896	geologist with the U.S. Geological Survey	
Henry W. Cannon	1884	Comptroller General of the United States	
Stephen Capps		geologist, U.S. Geological Survey	
Horace Capron	1879	United States Commissioner of Agriculture	
David Carliner		attorney with JAG Office Army, lecturer at the Harvard University Foreign Service Institute	
Frances Carpenter		Folklorist and photographer	
Wilbur J. Carr		assistant secretary of State, diplomat	
William George Carr		educator, executive secretary (chief administrator) of the National Education Association	
William Kearney Carr	1903	Philosopher, physician, author	
John Merven Carrère	1905	architect	
Henry A. P. Carter	1881	businessman, politician, and diplomat in the Kingdom of Hawaii	
Philip L. Cantelon	1984	academic, historian, co-founder and CEO of History Associates Incorporated	
Thomas Lincoln Casey Jr.	1894	major with the Army Corps of Engineers and entomologist	
James McKeen Cattell	1902	first professor of psychology in the U.S., editor of Science and Popular Science Monthly	
Bruce Catton		historian, author, and winner of the Pulitzer Prize for History	
Joan R. Challinor		chairperson of the National Commission on Libraries and Information Science	
Thomas Chrowder Chamberlin	1883–1889	geologist, president University of Wisconsin, founder of The Journal of Geology	
Steve Charnovitz		Legal scholar, writer, educator	
Hobart Chatfield-Taylor	1902	author, novelist	
Victor King Chesnut	1896	botanist. U.S. Department of Agriculture; expert in poisonous and Native American plants	
Colby Mitchell Chester		U.S. Navy admiral	
John White Chickering	1878–1880	Botanist, professor at Columbian Institution for Deaf and Dumb	
George B. Chittenden	1881	Chief topographer for the San Juan division and director of the White River division of the U.S. Geological Survey	
Hong-Yee Chiu		astrophysicist at NASA/Goddard Space Flight Center	
Martha E. Church	1988	geographer and president of Hood College	
Earle H. Clapp		forester	
Alonzo Howard Clark	1889	naturalist, author, historian, secretary American Historical Association, Smithsonian Institution	
Austin Hobart Clark		zoologist, curator U.S. National Museum	
Edgar E. Clark		attorney	
William Bullock Clark	1895	professor of geology at Johns Hopkins University	
William Mansfield Clark		chemist, academic, chief of the division of chemistry, U.S. Public Health Service	
Bruce C. Clarke	1968	U.S. army general	
Frank Wigglesworth Clarke	1883	chemist with the U.S. Geological Survey	
Stanwood Cobb		educator	
Theodore I. Coe		architect	
Roberta Cohen		executive director, International League for Human Rights; senior fellow Brookings Institution	
William Colby		CIA director	
Charles Cleaves Cole	1894–1895	associate justice Supreme Court of the District of Columbia	
William Byron Colver		chairman, Federal Trade Commission; general editorial director, Scripps-Howard newspapers	
Rita R. Colwell	1988	microbiologist	
Arthur Compton		physicist and winner of the Nobel Prize in Physics	
Karl Taylor Compton		physicist and president of Massachusetts Institute of Technology	
Wilson Martindale Compton		lawyer, president of the State College of Washington	
Charles Arthur Conant	1899	assistant secretary of the U.S. Treasury, journalist, economist	
James B. Conant		chemist	
David H. Condon	1967–1996	architect	
Willis Conover		radio producer, host of Voice of America's Music USA Jazz Hour	
Holmes Conrad	1895–1900, 1903	attorney, Solicitor General of the United States	
Nancy Conrad		teacher, author	
Joseph A. Conry	1935	consul of Russia; director of the Port of Boston; special attorney, U.S. Maritime Commission	
Orator F. Cook		botanist	
Luis Felipe Corea	1890–1902	minister to the United States from Nicaragua, E. E. and M. P. of Nicaragua	
Frederic René Coudert Sr.	1897–1899	lawyer	
Elliott Coues	1879	ornithologist, secretary of the U.S. Geological and Geographical Survey of the Territories	
Frederick Vernon Coville	1892	chief botanist with the U.S. Department of Agriculture	
J. Harry Covington		politician, Chief Justice of the Supreme Court of the District of Columbia	
Allyn Cox	1973	painter	
Thomas Craig	1879–1890	mathematician at Johns Hopkins University	
William Crentz	1962–2002	Engineer and a national authority on fossil fuels	
Oscar Terry Crosby	1896	electrician, assistant secretary of the U.S. Treasury, president of the World Federation League	
Charles Whitman Cross	1888	geologist and petrologist with U.S. Geological Survey	
George Crossette		Chief of the geographic research division of the National Geographic Society	
Barbara Culliton		science journalist, news editor at Science, and deputy editor of Nature	
Hugh S. Cumming		surgeon general, U.S. Public Health Service	
Harry F. Cunningham		architect	
Jabez Lamar Monroe Curry	1895	educator, diplomat, state politician, congressman	
George Edward Curtis	1889–1893	meteorologist with U.S. Weather Bureau, photographer	
William Eleroy Curtis	1886	journalist, author, director of the Bureau of the American Republics; Chief of the Latin American Department of the World's Columbian Exposition	
William Parker Cutter	1894	chemist, chief of the order division of the Library of Congress; director of the U.S. National Agricultural Library	
Charles William Dabney	1894	university president, assistant secretary at the U.S. Department of Agriculture	
William Healey Dall	1887	naturalist, curator of mollusks, U.S. National Museum of Natural History	
Joan Danziger	2003	sculptor	
Nelson Horatio Darton	1899	geologist with U.S. Geological Survey	
Joseph E. Davies		Lawyer and diplomat	
Arthur Powell Davis	1895	civil engineer and topographer with U. S. Geological Survey	
Bancroft Davis	1886–1892	attorney, judge of the Court of Claims, Reporter of Decisions of the Supreme Court of the U.S.	
Charles Henry Davis	1878	rear admiral of the U.S. Navy, worked on the United States Coast Survey	
George Whitefield Davis	1881–1885	engineer and major general in the U.S. Army, governor of the Panama Canal Zone	
James Cox Davis		director general of the Federal Railroad Administration	
John Davis	1886–1887	associate justice of the Court of Claims	
Arthur Louis Day		geophysicist; volcanologist; director Geophysical Laboratory, Carnegie Institution of Washington	
David Talbot Day	1889–1893, 1901	chief of mining and mineral division, U.S. Geological Survey	
Sara Day	2014	author of historical nonfiction	
Frederic Adrian Delano		railroad president, first Vice Chair of the Federal Reserve	
John Howard Dellinger		telecommunication engineer	
Laura DeNardis		endowed chair in technology, ethics, and society at Georgetown University	
Tyler Dennett		editor, writer, historian, recipient of the Pulitzer Prize for Biography or Autobiography	
Leon E. Dessez	1903	architect	
Dozier A. DeVane		attorney and judge, U.S. District Court for the Northern District of Florida and U.S. District Court for the Southern District of Florida.	
Arthur E. Dewey	2003	U.S. Assistant Secretary of State for Population, Refugees, and Migration	
Lyster Hoxie Dewey		botanist, U.S. Department of Agriculture	
Roscoe DeWitt		architect, one of the Monuments Men during World War II	
Edwin Grant Dexter		educator	
Joseph Silas Diller	1885	assistant geologist with the U.S. Geological Survey, academic	
Alvin E. Dodd		consulting engineer and president of the American Management Association	
Charles Richards Dodge	1894	Textile fiber expert, botanist with the Office of Fiber Investigation U.S. Department of Agriculture	
Edward W. Donn Jr.	1896	architect	
Marion Dorset	1902	chief, biochemical division of the Bureau of Animal Husbandry, U.S. Department of Agriculture	
George Amos Dorsey	1902	ethnographer, professor, curator of the Field Museum of Natural History	
Noah Ernest Dorsey		physicist	
Edward Morehouse Douglas	1887	geographer and topographer with the U.S. Geological Survey	
Alexander Wilson Drake	1884–1887	artist, art director of The Century Magazine	
Allen Drury		writer and winner of the Pulitzer Prize	
Horace Bookwalter Drury		Economist, academic, author	
Paul du Quenoy	2011	historian, professor, publisher, commentator, critic, Fulbright scholar	
Charles Benjamin Dudley	1900	chemist	
William Ward Duffield	1894–1897	superintendent, U. S. Coast and Geodetic Survey	
Arthur William Dunn		national director of the Junior American Red Cross, college lecturer	
Edward Dana Durand	1903	director of the United States Census Bureau	
Clarence Dutton	1878	geologist with the U.S. Geological Survey	
Theodore Frelinghuysen Dwight	1878–1882	librarian, archivist, and diplomat, a librarian with the U.S. Department of State	
William Sylvester Eames	1900	architect	
John Robie Eastman	1878	astronomer with Naval Observatory, professor of mathematics, U.S. Navy	
Edward D. Easton	1883–1902	founder and president of the Columbia Phonograph Company	
Burton Edelson		U.S. Navy officer, associate administrator of NASA	
Henry White Edgerton		attorney, academic, judge U.S. Court of Appeals for the District of Columbia Circuit	
John Joy Edson	1896–1898	president, Washington Loan & Trust Company	
Lawrence Edwards		innovator in aerospace and ground transportation	
Maurice F. Egan	1898	Professor, author, diplomat	
Edward Eggleston	1901	Novelist, historian	
William Snyder Eichelberger		astronomer, director of The Nautical Almanac, professor of mathematics U.S. Navy	
Churchill Eisenhart		mathematician; chief, Statistical Engineering Laboratory, National Bureau of Standards	
Milton Courtright Elliott		Lawyer and judge	
Samuel Franklin Emmons	1882–1892	geologist with the U.S. Geological Survey, president of the Geological Society of America	
Mordecai Thomas Endicott	1896	Civil engineer, chief of Yards and Docks Navy Department, father of the Civil Engineering Corps	
Carl Engel		pianist, composer, musicologist, chief of the music division of the Library of Congress	
William Phelps Eno		father of traffic safety	
Jesse Frederick Essary		journalist	
Edward Trantor Evans		senior topographer with the U.S. Geological Survey	
Robley D. Evans	1883–1901	U.S. Navy admiral	
Barton Warren Evermann	1898	ichthyologist, U. S. Commission of Fish and Fisheries	
William M. Ewing	1942	geophysicist at the University of Texas, National Medal of Science recipient	
David Fairchild	1898	Plant explorer and botanist, Bureau of Plant Industry U.S. Department of Agriculture	
Tom Farer		academic, author, and former president of the University of New Mexico	
Guy Otto Farmer		lawyer, chairman of the National Labor Relations Board	
Arthur Briggs Farquhar	1902	Businessman and writer	
John Barclay Fassett	1886–1887	Medal of Honor recipient	
Oliver Lanard Fassig	1893	meteorologist with the U.S. Weather Bureau, professor at Johns Hopkins University	
Clarence Norman Fenner		geologist	
Henry G. Ferguson		geologist with U.S. Geological Survey	
Thomas B. Ferguson	1879–1880	United States Ambassador to Sweden, assistant commissioner of Fish and Fisheries	
Alan Fern		scholar of American prints and photographs at the Library of Congress	
Bernhard Fernow	1887	director, New York State College of Forestry, Cornell University; chief, U.S. Division of Forestry	
Jesse Walter Fewkes		chief, Bureau of Ethnology, Smithsonian Institution	
George Wilton Field		biologist	
Albert Kenrick Fisher	1902	biologist, U.S. Department of Agriculture; ornithologist	
Walter Kenrick Fisher	1902	biologist, U.S. Department of Agriculture; zoologist, evolutionary biologist, illustrator, and painter	
John Fitterer	1973	educator and president of the Association of Jesuit Colleges and Universities	
J. A. Henry Flemer	1886–1888	architect	
James Milton Flint	1880	medical director, U. S. Navy; medical collection curator U.S. National Museum	
Allen Ripley Foote	1891	political economist, author, and founder of the National Tax Association	
Paul D. Foote		physicist, U.S. Assistant Secretary of Defense for Research and Engineering	
Kenneth M. Ford		computer scientist	
William H. Forwood	1903	surgeon general of the U.S. Army	
John W. Foster	1889	Secretary of State, jurist, diplomat	
William Dudley Foulke	1902	Civil service commissioner, literary critic, journalist, reformer	
Harry Crawford Frankenfield		senior meteorologist, U.S. Weather Bureau	
John Hope Franklin	1963	historian	
James E. Freeman		Bishop of the Episcopal Diocese of Washington	
Herbert Friedenwald	1894	author, historian, librarian, and secretary of the American Jewish Committee	
Daniel Mortimer Friedman		judge, U.S. Court of Appeals for the Federal Circuit; chief judge of the U.S.Court of Claims	
Paul L. Friedman		judge	
Ed Frost		sculptor	
Thomas James Duncan Fuller Jr.	1900	architect	
Ira Noel Gabrielson		entomologist	
Frank E. Gaebelein	1965	educator, author, editor of Christianity Today	
Arthur Burton Gahan		entomologist, U.S. Department of Agriculture	
John Kenneth Galbraith		economist	
Hugh Gregory Gallagher		disability advocate	
Edward Miner Gallaudet	1878	first president of Gallaudet University	
Beverly Thomas Galloway	1894	chief of Bureau of Plant Industry, Department of Agriculture	
Henry Gannett	1878	chief geographer-in-charge of topographic mapping U.S. Geological Survey	
Samuel Gannett	1891	geographer, U.S. Geological Survey	
Wilbur E. Garrett	1966	photographer, editor of National Geographic	
Hampson Gary		colonel, U.S. Army; lawyer, and diplomat	
Georgie Anne Geyer		journalist; syndicated columnist, television news analyst	
Tatiana C. Gfoeller		ambassador	
Riccardo Giacconi		astrophysicist and the winner of the Nobel Prize	
Cass Gilbert	1902	architect	
Grove Karl Gilbert	1878	geologist with the U.S. Geological Survey	
Joseph Bernard Gildenhorn	2013	attorney, U.S. Ambassador to Switzerland	
Theodore Gill	1878	Biologist, zoologist	
Daniel Coit Gilman	1878–1882, 1903	president, Johns Hopkins University; president, Carnegie Institution of Washington	
Charles C. Glover	1887–1891, 1903	treasurer, Corcoran Gallery of Art; banker	
Martin B. Gold	2000	lobbeyist	
Arthur J. Goldberg		U.S. Secretary of Labor, U.S. Supreme Court Justice, and Ambassador to the United Nations	
Joseph Goldberger		epidemiologist and surgeon, U.S. Public Health Service	
Edward Alphonso Goldman		biologist	
Frank Austin Gooch	1884–1886	chemist and engineer	
George Brown Goode	1881	ichthyologist and assistant secretary of the Smithsonian Institution	
Richard Urquhart Goode	1886	geographer and topographer with the U.S. Geological Survey	
Elliot Hersey Goodwin		vice president and secretary of the United States Chamber of Commerce	
James Howard Gore	1883	geodesist, author, and professor of mathematics at the Columbian University	
Carol Graham	2008	Economist, Leo Pasvolsky Senior Fellow at the Brookings Institution	
Henry S. Graves	1898–1901	chief of the United States Forest Service, co-founded the Yale Forest School	
Horace Gray	1882	U.S. Supreme Court justice	
John H. Gray		Economist, academic	
William B. Greeley		chief of the United States Forest Service	
Adolphus Greely	1887	polar explorer, brigadier general and chief signal officer in the U. S. Army	
William R. Green		congressman, judge of the Court of Claims	
Edward Lee Greene	1895–1902	professor of botany, Catholic University	
Charles Ravenscroft Greenleaf	1889–1903	assistant surgeon general and brigadier general, U. S. Army	
James Leal Greenleaf		Landscape architect and civil engineer	
Willis Ray Gregg		meteorologist and chief of the U.S. Weather Bureau	
Robert Fiske Griggs		botanist, academic, head of National Geographic Society	
Gilbert M. Grosvenor	1901	president and chairman of the National Geographic Society, editor of National Geographic	
Nathan Clifford Grover		chief hydraulic engineer, U.S. Geological Survey; academic	
John M. Grunsfeld		astronaut and astronomer	
Francis M. Gunnell	1878	Surgeon General U.S. Navy	
Alexander Burton Hagner	1883	associate justice Supreme Court District of Columbia	
Arnold Hague	1884	geologist, U. S. Geological Survey	
Benjamin F. Hake		geologist and general manager of Gulf Oil Company of Bolivia	
Asaph Hall Jr.	1890–1895	astronomer	
Henry Clay Hall		attorney and commissioner of the Interstate Commerce Commission	
Percival Hall		president of Gallaudet University	
William Hallock	1885–1886	physicist, U. S. Geological Survey	
Stefan Halper		Foreign policy scholar	
Walton Hale Hamilton		economist and professor at Yale Law School	
Charles Sumner Hamlin	1879	Assistant Secretary of the Treasury	
John Hays Hammond		Mining engineer, diplomat	
Hugh S. Hanna		president, The Capital Transit Company	
George Wallace William Hanger	1902	chief clerk, Department of Labor; U.S. Board of Mediation	
Norman Hapgood		writer, journalist, editor, critic, and an American minister to Denmark	
William Hard		Social reformist and journalist	
William Harkness	1878	astronomer, professor of mathematics for the U. S. Navy	
James S. Harlan		attorney	
Mark Walrod Harrington	1891–1898	chief of Weather Bureau, U.S. Department of Agriculture	
Albert L. Harris		architect	
William Torrey Harris	1890	commissioner of education, U.S. Department of Interior; educator, lexicographer	
Albert Bushnell Hart		academic, historian, writer, and editor	
Frederick Hart	1983	Sculptor, and designer of the soldiers at the Vietnam Veterans Memorial	
Thomas Hastings	1918–1919	architect	
George Wesson Hawes	1881	geologist, curator U.S. National Museum	
Joseph Roswell Hawley	1887–1890	congressman, senator, Governor of Connecticut	
William Perry Hay	1900	zoologist, professor of natural sciences at Howard University	
Edward Everett Hayden	1885	naval officer, meteorologist with the Smithsonian Institution and the US Geological Survey	
Charles Willard Hayes	1892	geologist, U. S. Geological Survey	
Harvey C. Hayes		pioneer in underwater acoustics, superintendent of Naval Research Laboratory Sound Division	
Helen Hayes	1988	actress	
John Fillmore Hayford	1898	assistant, U. S. Coast and Geodetic Survey	
William Babcock Hazen	1884	brigadier general, Chief Signal Officer, U. S. Army	
A. G. Heaton	1886	artist, painter	
Arthur B. Heaton		architect	
Nicholas H. Heck		geophysicist and officer of the United States Coast and Geodetic Survey Corps	
Carl Heinrich		entomologist, U.S. Department of Agriculture and U.S. National Museum	
Henry Henshaw	1878	ornithologist and ethnologist with the Bureau of American Ethnology	
Christian A. Herter Jr.		politician, vice president of Mobil Oil Company	
Charles M. Herzfeld		scientist and director of DARPA	
Donnel Foster Hewett		geologist, U.S. Geological Survey	
Francis J. Higginson	1883–1896	rear admiral in the U.S. Navy	
Julius Erasmus Hilgard	1882–1883	superintendent, United States Coast and Geodetic Survey	
Charles E. Hill		professor and administrator at George Washington University, international law expert	
David Jayne Hill	1898	Assistant Secretary of State, U. S. Minister to Switzerland	
James G. Hill	1893	architect, head of the Office of the Supervising Architect, U.S. Department of the Treasury	
Joseph Adna Hill	1900	statistician and chief of the division, U.S. Census Office	
Nathaniel P. Hill	1883	senator, professor of Brown University, mining engineer	
Samuel Hill	1895–1900	lawyer, railroad executive, president Minneapolis Trust Co.	
Robert Cutler Hinckley	1886–1887	artist	
A. S. Hitchcock		agrostologist and senior botanist with the U.S. Department of Agriculture	
Frank Harris Hitchcock	1901	chief, section of foreign markets, U.S. Department of Agriculture, U.S. Postmaster General	
William Hitz		associate justice, U.S. Court of Appeals for the District of Columbia and Supreme Court of the District of Columbia	
Frederick Webb Hodge	1898	international exchanges, Smithsonian Institution; anthropologist, archaeologist, and historian	
Howard Lincoln Hodgkins	1895	professor of mathematics, Columbian University	
Samuel B. Holabird	1887–1889	brigadier general, quartermaster general, U. S. Army	
Edward S. Holden	1878	astronomer and professor of mathematics for U. S. Navy	
William Jacob Holland	1900	zoologist' director, Carnegie Museum of Natural History; chancellor, University of Pittsburgh	
Herman Hollerith	1886	statistician, inventor	
Ned Hollister		biologist and superintendent of the National Zoological Park	
Joseph Austin Holmes	1902	geologist, first director of the U.S. Bureau of Mines	
Oliver Wendell Holmes		archivist and historian	
William Henry Holmes	1878	chief, Bureau of American Ethnology; illustrator, U.S. Geological Survey; archaeologist,Smithsonian Institution	
Judy Holoviak	1999	director of publications at the American Geophysical Union	
Calvin B. Hoover		Economist and academic	
Herbert Hoover	1921–1964	president of the United States	
Andrew Delmar Hopkins	1903	entomologist, investigator of foliage insects of the U.S. Department of Agriculture	
Stanley Hornbeck		Economist, author, professor, diplomat	
William Temple Hornaday	1888–1890	taxidermist, U. S. National Museum; zoologist; first director of the New York Zoological Park	
Joseph Coerten Hornblower	1883	architect	
George Horton		consul general, U.S. Foreign Service	
Walter Hough	1890	ethnologist, anthropologist, curator of anthropology at the U.S. National Museum	
Riley D. Housewright		microbiologist	
Richard Hovey	1893	poet	
Leland Ossian Howard	1886–1950	entomologist, chief of the Division of Entomology, Department of Agriculture	
Harrison E. Howe		chemical engineer, head of the Division of Research Extension, National Research Council,	
William Wirt Howe	1899	associate justice Louisiana Supreme Court	
Alfred Brazier Howell		comparative anatomist, zoologist	
Edwin E. Howell	1891	Geologist, relief map maker	
Henry W. Howgate	1878	U.S. Army Signal Corps officer and Arctic explorer	
Henry L. Howison	1883–1884	rear admiral, U.S. Navy; professor and department head, United States Naval Academy	
Richard L. Hoxie		brigadier general in the United States Army	
Gardiner Greene Hubbard	1883	lawyer, president of the National Geographic Society	
Henry Guernsey Hubbard	1884	entomologist, U.S. Department of Agriculture	
J. Stephen Huebner	1973	research geologist with the U.S. Geological Survey	
Edgar Erskine Hume		physician, a major general in the U.S Army medical corps	
Paul Hume		music critic	
Harry Baker Humphrey		botanist, pathologist with the U.S. Department of Agriculture	
Edward Eyre Hunt Jr.		academic, physical anthropologist and human biologist	
William Jackson Humphreys		Physicist and atmospheric researcher	
Gaillard Hunt	1894–1897	state department, author	
Thomas Sterry Hunt	1887	chemist, geologist, mineralogist	
Benjamin Hutto		musician specializing in writing, producing and directing choral music	
James A. Hyslop		entomologist, U.S. Bureau of Entomology and Plant Quarantine.	
Joseph P. Iddings	1885	professor of petrology, University of Chicago	
M. Thomas Inge		academic	
Ernest Ingersoll	1882	Naturalist, writer, explorer	
Ketanji Brown Jackson		U.S. Supreme Court justice	
William Henry Jackson		Photographer, painter	
Elaine Jaffe	1988	physician; pathologist; National Cancer Institute, National Institutes of Health	
A. Everette James Jr.	1981–2017	radiologist, academic, and founder of the Center for Medical Imaging Research	
J. Franklin Jameson		historian, director of the department of historical research, Carnegie Institution of Washington	
William Marion Jardine		United States Secretary of Agriculture, U.S. Minister to Egypt	
Jeremiah Jenks	1903	professor of economics at Cornell University	
Emory Richard Johnson	1900	economist, Isthmian Canal Commissioner	
Nelson T. Johnson		ambassador, diplomat	
Andrieus A. Jones		Senator, lawyer	
Ernest Lester Jones		Director of the United States Coast and Geodetic Survey, father of the Coast and Geodetic Survey Corps, which later became the NOAA Commissioned Corps	
H. McCoy Jones	1969	president of the International Hajji Baba Society, oriental rug collector	
Neil Judd		curator of American archaeology, U.S. National Museum	
Julius Kaplan	1983	art historian	
Walter Karig		Officer in charge of the Navy Narrative History Project, assistant director of Navy public relations	
Samuel Hay Kauffman	1881	publisher, editor of the Evening Star	
Rudolph Kauffmann		managing editor Evening Star, vice president Evening Star Company	
Thomas Henry Kearney	1901	botanist and agronomist, U.S. Department of Agriculture	
Robert V. Keeley	1985	diplomat	
Arthur Keith		geologist, U.S. Geological Survey	
Vernon Lyman Kellogg		secretary, National Research Council; entomologist	
Brian Kelly	2013	author, journalist, editor	
George Kennan	1879–1885	Explorer, author, lecturer	
George F. Kennan		Diplomat and historian	
Frederick C. Kenyon	1897	zoologist and anatomist	
Washington Caruther Kerr	1882–1884	State Geologist of North Carolina	
Mary Dublin Keyserling	1988	economist	
Jerome H. Kidder	1879	surgeon, astronomer with Smithsonian Institution and Naval Research Laboratory	
James J. Kilpatrick		Journalist, newspaper columnist	
Sumner Increase Kimball	1887	politician, superintendent United States Life Savings Service	
William Wirt Kimball	1879–1880	U.S. naval officer and an early pioneer in the development of submarines	
Albert Freeman Africanus King	1880	physician	
Clarence King	1878–1881	first director of the U.S. Geological Survey	
Henry Kissinger		United States Secretary of State and winner of the Nobel Prize	
Jacques Paul Klein		Senior Foreign Service Officer (Ret.); Under-Secretary-General of the United Nations (Ret.); Major General of the USAF (Ret.)	
Ernest Knaebel		lawyer, reporter of decisions of the United States Supreme Court	
Martin Augustine Knapp	1893	chairman, Interstate Commerce Commission; United States circuit judge	
Frank Knowlton	1890	paleontologist, U. S. Geological Survey	
John Jay Knox Jr.	1878	Comptroller of the Currency, U.S. Treasury Department	
Simmie Knox	2006	Painter, portraitist	
George M. Kober		physician, author, namesake of George M. Kober Medal and Lectureship	
John Oliver La Gorce		editor, National Geographic Society	
Carol C. Laise	1988	director of Georgetown University Institute for the Study of Diplomacy; Ambassador to Nepal	
Theodore Frederick Laist	1901	architect; chief architect central district, Interstate Commerce Commission	
Samuel Langley	1880	physicist, astronomer, Secretary of the Smithsonian	
Walter H. Larrimer		entomologist; chief, Bureau of Entomology, U.S. Department of Agriculture	
Carl. W. Larson		Chief, Bureau of Dairy Industry, U.S. Department of Agriculture; director, National Dairy Council	
James Laurence Laughlin		Economist, academic	
Thelma Z. Lavine		Philosopheracademic	
Luther Morris Leisenring		architect	
Levi Leiter	1883	capitalist, co-founded Marshall Field & Company	
Peter P. Lejins	1970	educator, criminologist, director of the National Institute of Criminal Justice and Criminology	
Waldo Gifford Leland		historian and archivist, Carnegie Institution and Library of Congress	
Samuel Conrad Lemly	1884–1890	Judge Advocate General of the Navy	
Harvey J. Levin	1986	economist	
Francis E. Leupp	1885–1894, 1902	journalist, New York Evening Post assistant editor, Commissioner of Indian Affairs	
David C. Levy		president and director of the Corcoran Gallery of Art and Corcoran College of Art and Design	
George W. Lewis		director, Aeronautical Research, National Advisory Committee for Aeronautics	
Sinclair Lewis		writer, playwright, and winner of the Nobel Prize	
William Mather Lewis		teacher, university president, state and national government official	
Manuel de Oliveira Lima		Brazilian writer, literary critic, diplomat, historian, and journalist	
Samuel C. Lind		radiation chemist, the father of modern radiation chemistry	
Waldemar Lindgren	1896	geologist, U. S. Geological Survey	
Michael C. Linn		Attorney and businessman	
Sol Linowitz	1994	lawyer	
Walter Lippmann		journalist and winner of the Pulitzer Prize winner	
George W. Littlehales	1900	hydrographic engineer, Navy Department	
Arthur H. Livermore		professor of biochemistry at Cornell University and Reed College	
Charles S. Lobingier		International judge, author, and law instructor	
Edwin Chesley Estes Lord	1895	geologist and petrologist with U.S. Geological Survey	
Max O. Lorenz		economist and statistician	
Alan David Lourie		U.S. circuit judge, chemist	
Alfred Maurice Low	1898	journalist	
Isador Lubin		head, U.S. Bureau of Labor Statistics	
Anthony Francis Lucas	1893	engineer, explorer	
Robert Luce		Congressman, writer,	
William Ludlow	1883–1888	major, U.S. Army Corps of Engineers; major general U.S. Army	
David Alexander Lyle	1887	major, Ordnance Department, U.S. Army; inventor of the Lyle gun	
Theodore Lyman III	1884–1885	Natural scientist, congressman	
Frank Lyon		lawyer, newspaper publisher, and land developer	
Arthur MacArthur Sr.	1888–1893	associate justice, Supreme Court District of Columbia; Governor of Wisconsin	
Alexander Mackay-Smith	1893–1903	bishop of the Episcopal Diocese of Pennsylvania	
Archibald MacLeish		poet, Librarian of Congress, and winner of a Pulitzer Prize	
Garrick Mallery	1878	ethnologist at the Smithsonian Institution	
Charles M. Manly	1899	engineer	
Charles A. Mann	1887	Lawyer and politician	
Parker Mann	1887–1890, 1894–1899	artist	
Van H. Manning	1893	director of the U.S. Bureau of Mines	
George Rogers Mansfield		geologist, U.S. Geological Survey	
Curtis F. Marbut		Director of the Soil Survey Division of the U.S. Department of Agriculture	
Deanna B. Marcum	1994	librarian, president of the Council on Library and Information Resources	
Hans Mark		professor of aerospace engineering, U.S. Secretary of the Air Force	
Ronald A. Marks		senior official with the Central Intelligence Agency	
Charles Lester Marlatt	1894	chief of the Bureau of Entomology	
Harry A. Marmer		engineer, mathematician, and oceanographer with the United States Coast and Geodetic Survey	
Fred Maroon		photographer	
Charles Dwight Marsh		botanist; physiologist, U.S. Department of Agriculture	
William Johnston Marsh	1895	architect	
James Rush Marshall	1883	architect	
H. Newell Martin	1878–1880	physiologist, professor of biology at Johns Hopkins University	
Robert S. Martin		librarian, archivist, administrator, and professor	
Susan K Martin	1988	librarian; executive director, National Commission on Libraries and Information Science	
Charles F. Marvin	1890	professor of meteorology; chief, U.S. Weather Bureau	
Otis Tufton Mason	1878–1898	ethnologist; curator, U.S. National Museum	
Stephen Mather		first director of the National Park Service	
François E. Matthes		geologist, U.S. Geological Survey	
Washington Matthews	1884–1900	surgeon in the United States Army, ethnographer, and linguist	
Philip Mauro	1894	lawyer	
George Hebard Maxwell	1899	lawyer, lobbyist, executive chairman National Irrigation Association	
O. Louis Mazzatenta	2011	photographer and editor with National Geographic	
Addams Stratton McAllister		Physicist, electrical engineer,	
John S. McCain Jr.		United States Navy admiral	
S. S. McClure	1892	co-founder and editor of McClure's	
Richard Cunningham McCormick	1896–1899	governor of Arizona Territory, congressman, journalist	
George Walter McCoy		director of the National Institute of Health	
Walter I. McCoy		chief justice of the D.C. Supreme Court	
Arthur Williams McCurdy	1898	inventor, astronomer	
William John McGee	1885	ethnologist, Smithsonian Institution	
John P. McGovern	1953–2007	allergist and philanthropist	
Gerald S. McGowan		lawyer, U.S. Ambassador to Portugal	
Jonas H. McGowan	1902	Lawyer, congressman	
Frederick Banders McGuire	1883–1901	director Corcoran Art Gallery	
Charles Follen McKim	1902	architect	
William B. McKinley		U.S. Senator, U.S. Representative	
Ann Dore McLaughlin	1988	U.S. Secretary of Labor	
Robert McNamara		U.S. Secretary of Defense	
Elwood Mead	1903	irrigation engineer, head of United States Bureau of Reclamation	
Milton Bennett Medary		architect	
Oscar Edward Meinzer		hydrogeologist	
Thomas Corwin Mendenhall	1885	superintendent U. S. Coast and Geodetic Survey; president Worcester Polytechnic Institute	
Walter Curran Mendenhall	1902	director of the US Geological Survey	
Clinton Hart Merriam	1886	chief U.S. Biological Survey, U.S. Department of Agriculture	
John Campbell Merriam		paleontologist	
William Rush Merriam	1899–1900	director of the U.S. Census, governor of Minnesota	
George Perkins Merrill	1893	curator, department of geology, U.S. National Museum	
Edmund Clarence Messer	1902	artist	
Balthasar H. Meyer		Interstate Commerce Commission, economist, academic	
Eugene Meyer		chairman of the Federal Reserve, publisher of The Washington Post	
Ellen Miles	2005	curator of the National Portrait Gallery	
Christine Odell Cook Miller		judge, U.S. Court of Federal Claims	
Eleazar Hutchinson Miller	1893–1899	artist	
Gerrit Smith Miller Jr.	1903	biologist, assistant curator of mammals, U.S. National Museum	
Warren L. Miller		chairman, U.S. Commission for the Preservation of America's Heritage Abroad	
John D. Millett		chancellor, Miami University; senior vice president, Academy for Educational Development	
Robert Andrews Millikan		physicist and recipient of the Nobel Prize in Physics	
Harry A. Millis		economist, educator, chairman of the National Labor Relations Board	
Arthur Millspaugh		Administrator general of the finance of Persia	
George Heron Milne		Librarian and chief of the Congressional Reading Room	
Cosmos Mindeleff	1887	journalist	
Charles Sedgwick Minot	1902	anatomist and a founding member of the American Society for Psychical Research	
Betty C. Monkman	2004	curator of the White House	
Charles Moore	1891	Journalist, historian, city planner, and clerk to the Senate Committee on the District of Columbia	
George Thomas Moore	1903	botanist, plant physiologist, algologist, U.S. Department of Agriculture	
John Moore	1887	Surgeon General of the U.S. Army	
John Bassett Moore	1887	judge, Assistant Secretary of State, professor of law and diplomacy at Columbia University	
Veranus Alva Moore	1895	professor of comparative pathology and bacteriology, Cornell University	
Willis Luther Moore	1895	chief of the weather bureau, U.S. Department of Agriculture	
George W. Morey		geochemist, physical chemist, mineralogist, and petrologist	
Sylvanus Morley		archaeologist	
Edward Lyman Morris		botanist, curator of the Brooklyn Institute of Arts and Sciences	
Edward Lind Morse	1902	artist	
Harold G. Moulton		economist	
Charles Edward Munroe	1882–1885, 1892	chemistry professor, Columbian University	
Denys Peter Myers	1977–2003	architectural historian with National Park Service, part of the Monuments Men team	
Charles Willis Needham	1894	president George Washington University; solicitor, Interstate Commerce Commission	
Charles P. Neill	1900	economist, U.S. Commissioner of Labor; professor of political economy, Catholic University	
Edward William Nelson	1882–1883, 1903	naturalist and ethnologist, chief of the U.S. Bureau of Biological Survey	
Henry Clay Nelson	1883	medical inspector and assistant surgeon general of the U.S. Navy	
Edwin Lowe Neville		diplomat	
W. Coleman Nevils		Jesuit educator	
John Strong Newberry	1878	professor of geology and paleontology at Columbia University School of Mines	
Simon Newcomb	1880	rear admiral, professor at the Naval Observatory and Georgetown University	
Frederick Haynes Newell	1890	chief, division of hydrography, U. S. Geological Survey; director, U.S. Bureau of Reclamation	
Oliver Peck Newman		president of the Board of Commissioners of the District of Columbia; journalist	
David George Newton		United States Ambassador to Iraq and Yemen	
Hobart Nichols	1902–1962	painter; paleontologic draftsman, U.S. Geological Survey	
Nathaniel B. Nichols		illustrator with U.S. Geological Survey and Bureau of American Ethnology	
Harald Herborg Nielsen	1954	physicist	
Charles Nordhoff	1880–1883, 1888	Journalist, author	
Thaddeus Norris	1894–1897	writer, father of American fly fishing	
S. N. D. North	1899	director of the U.S. Census, statistician	
Janet L. Norwood	1988	economist, statistician, U.S. Commissioner of Labor Statistics	
Crosby Stuart Noyes	1884	editor and publisher of the Washington Evening Star	
Theodore W. Noyes	1887	editor the Washington Evening Star	
William A. Noyes	1903	chemist, professor of chemistry at the University of Illinois at Urbana-Champaign	
Perley G. Nutting		optical physicist and the founder of the Optical Society of America	
Harry C. Oberholser		ornithologist	
Robert Lincoln O'Brien	1899	journalist, chairman of U.S. Tariff Commission	
Stephen J. O'Brien		geneticist	
Sandra Day O'Connor		U.S. Supreme Court justice	
Paul Henry Oehser		journalist	
Goetz Oertel		physicist	
Herbert Gouverneur Ogden	1889	civil engineer, inspector of hydrography and topography, United States Coast and Geodetic Survey	
Frederick E. Olmsted	1902	forester and agent with the Bureau of Forestry, U.S. Department of Agriculture	
Frederick Law Olmsted Jr.	1917–1957	landscape architect	
Mark Olshaker		author	
Frederick I. Ordway III		Air space scientist, author, educator	
William Allen Orton		Plant pathologist, Director of the Tropical Research Foundation	
Henry Fairfield Osborn	1894	academic, president of the American Museum of Natural History	
Wilfred Hudson Osgood	1901	zoologist; staff with Division of Biological Survey, U.S. Department of Agriculture	
Joseph H. Outhwaite	1886–1893	Lawyer and congressman	
Robert Latham Owen	1899	Senator for Oklahoma	
Robert Oxnam		Writer and academic	
Harvey L. Page	1880	architect	
Thomas Nelson Page	1885	author and U.S. Ambassador to Italy	
William Nelson Page		Civil engineer and industrialist	
Sidney Paige		geologist, faculty of Columbia University	
Alajos Paikert	1901–1903	farmer, lawyer, director of the Museum of Hungarian Agricultural	
Theodore Sherman Palmer	1885	co-founder of the National Audubon Society	
Stefan Panaretov		Diplomat and professor	
Walter Paris	1883–1885	artist	
John Parke	1878–1880	colonel with the U.S. Army Corps of Engineers, general in the Civil War	
Charles Lathrop Parsons		chemist	
William Ordway Partridge	1894	sculptor	
Leo Pasvolsky		Journalist, economist	
Stewart Paton	1903	educator and physician specializing in neuropsychiatry	
Richard North Patterson		novelist	
Raymond Stanton Patton		director of the United States Coast and Geodetic Survey, rear admiral	
Charles O. Paullin		author, naval historian	
George Foster Peabody	1896	banker	
Albert Charles Peale	1883	geologist, mineralogist, paleobotanist, Section of Paleobotany U.S. National Museum	
Raymond Allen Pearson	1897	Assistant, Dairy Division, U.S. Department of Agriculture; college president	
Horace Peaslee	1926–1959	architect	
Dallas Lynn Peck		director of the U.S. Geological Survey	
William Thomas Pecora		director of the U.S. Geological Survey	
Stanton J. Peelle		Politician and jurist	
R. A. F. Penrose Jr.	1889–1897	geologist with the U. S. Geological Survey	
Jack Perlmutter		artist, printmaker	
Joseph E. Pesce	2010	astrophysicist	
William John Peters	1889	topographer, U. S. Geological Survey, explorer	
Esther Peterson	1988	consumer advocate; United Nations representative	
Ivan Petrof	1881–1885	Writer, translator, and statistician of Alaska for the U.S. Census	
Duncan Phillips		art collector and critic who played a seminal role in introducing modern art to America	
Walter P. Phillips	1882–1888	head of the United Press International, journalist, telegrapher, and inventor	
Thomas R. Pickering		diplomat	
Ulysses Grant Baker Pierce	1901	Unitarian minister who served as Chaplain of the United States Senate	
Theodore Wells Pietsch I	1902	architect; designer, Office Supervising Architect, U.S. Treasury Department	
Charles Snowden Piggot		chemist and geophysicist, one of the founding fathers of ocean-bottom marine research	
James Pilling	1879	ethnologist, Bureau of Ethnology	
Michael Pillsbury		Strategist and expert on China	
Gifford Pinchot	1897–1946	chief forester of the U.S. Department of Agriculture	
Edmund Platt		congressman, vice chairman of the Federal Reserve	
Michael Pocalyko		Businessman and writer	
Forrest Pogue		military historian	
William Mundy Poindexter	1883	architect	
Charles Louis Pollard	1900	botanist, assistant curator for the U.S. Department of Agriculture, Division of Botany	
John Addison Porter	1884–1888	clerk to Senate Committee; Secretary to the President, journalist	
George B. Post	1903	architect	
Louis F. Post		Assistant United States Secretary of Labor	
John Wesley Powell	1878	director of the U.S. Geological Survey, director Bureau of American Ethnology	
William Bramwell Powell	1886–1901	educator	
Frederick Belding Power		Research chemist and academic	
Frank Presbrey	1892–1894	pioneering advertiser	
Overton Westfeldt Price	1902	assistant chief, Forestry Division, U.S. Department of Agriculture	
William Jennings Price		professor of law Georgetown University; Envoy Extraordinary and Minister Plenipotentiary (Panama)	
Irwin G. Priest		Chief of Colorimetry Section Bureau of Standards	
Henry Smith Pritchett	1878–1880, 1897	astronomer, university president, superintendent of United States Coast and Geodetic Survey	
John Robert Procter	1894	geologist, Kentucky State geolostic survey, civil service commissioner	
Raphael Pumpelly	1889–1894	Geologist, author, explorer	
Edmund R. Purves		architect	
Merlo J. Pusey		journalist	
Herbert Putnam	1900	Librarian of Congress	
Frederic Bennett Pyle	1900	architect	
Altus Lacy Quaintance		Entomologist and associate chief of the U.S. Bureau of Entomology	
Wallace Radcliffe		pastor of the New York Avenue Presbyterian Church, moderator of the General Assembly of the Presbyterian Church	
Jackson H. Ralston		Lawyer, professor of international law	
John Hall Rankin	1902	architect	
Frederick Leslie Ransome	1899	geologist, U.S. Geological Survey	
Richard Rathbun	1883	biologist and assistant secretary of the Smithsonian Institution	
George Lansing Raymond	1898	professor of esthetics, Princeton University	
Mila Rechcigl		researcher	
Walter Reed	1893	U.S. Army physician and surgeon	
John Bernard Reeside Jr.		geologist and paleontologist, U.S. Geological Survey	
Alan Reich		deputy assistant Secretary of State for Educational and cultural affairs	
Ira Remsen	1878–1882	chemist and president of Johns Hopkins University	
James Burton Reynolds		banker, Assistant Secretary of the Treasury	
Joseph J. Reynolds	1886	colonel, cavalry, U.S. Army; engineer, and educator	
C. Allen Thorndike Rice	1879	journalist and the editor and publisher of the North American Review	
George S. Rice		Chief, Mining Division, U.S. Bureau of Mines	
Joseph Mayer Rice	1897	physician, editor of The Forum magazine	
Lois Rice	1988	Education policy scholar	
William Gorham Rice	1896	Civil Service Commissioner, author	
George Burr Richardson	1902	field geologist with U.S. Geological Survey	
Charles Valentine Riley	1878	pioneer in entomology, curator of insects at the U.S. National Museum	
Arthur Cuming Ringland		forester, conservationist, and founder of CARE	
Sidney Dillon Ripley II		ornithologist, secretary of the Smithsonian Institution	
Charles Ritcheson		historian, diplomat, and university administrator	
William Emerson Ritter		Zoologist, biologist	
Ellis H. Roberts		Treasurer of the United States, congressman	
George E. Roberts	1901	director of the United States Mint	
Beverly Robertson	1886–1890	cavalry officer in the United States Army	
George M. Robeson	1883–1886	Secretary of the Navy, congressman	
Thomas Ralph Robinson		horticulturalist	
Nelson Rockefeller		Vice President of the United States	
William Woodville Rockhill	1901	diplomat, director Bureau American Republics	
Lore Alford Rogers		bacteriologist, Bureau of Dairy Industry, U.S. Department of Agriculture	
Sievert Allen Rohwer		entomologist	
Nina Roscher	1988	Professor of chemistry at American University	
Edward Bennett Rosa	1902	physicist, U.S. Bureau of Standards	
Milton J. Rosenau	1902	professor and assistant surgeon, Public Health and Marine Hospital Service	
Joseph Nelson Rose	1893	assistant curator, Department of Botany, U.S. National Museum	
John F. Ross	2000	Historian and author	
Abbott Lawrence Rotch	1891	meteorologist, Blue Hill Meteorological Observatory	
Leo Stanton Rowe	1901	professor at the University of Pennsylvania, director general of the Pan-American Union	
Henry Augustus Rowland	1878–1887	physicist and Johns Hopkins educator	
George Rublee		lawyer	
Walter Rundell Jr.		Historian, archivist, and author	
William Edwin Safford		botanist	
Carl Sagan		Astrophysicist, cosmologist, and author	
Daniel Elmer Salmon	1884	veterinarian; chief Bureau Animal Industry, Department of Agriculture	
William Salomon	1897	banker	
Henry Y. Satterlee	1903	Bishop of Washington, Episcopal Church	
Rufus Saxton	1889–1891	colonel, assistant Quartermaster General, U.S. Army	
Antonin Scalia	19xx–1985	U.S. Supreme Court Justice	
Rudolf E. Schoenfeld	1952–1981	ambassador	
James Brown Scott		authority on international law, author, secretary of the Carnegie Endowment for International Peace	
Frank Charles Schrader	1903	geologist with U.S. Geological Survey, professor at Harvard University	
Charles Schuchert	1895	invertebrate paleontologist, assistant curator for U.S. National Museum	
Carol Schwartz	1989	politician	
Eugene Amandus Schwarz	1889	entomological investigator, U.S. Department of Agriculture	
Emil Alexander de Schweinitz	1889	director of biochemical laboratory, U.S. Department of Agriculture	
Glenn T. Seaborg		chemist and winner of the Nobel Prize	
William Henry Seaman	1887	examiner, U.S. Patent Office; a federal judge	
George Mary Searle	1890–1894	Catholic priest and professor of astronomy, Catholic University	
Atherton Seidell		founder of the American Documentation Institute	
Harold Seidman		political scientist	
Frederick Seitz	1954	physicist at Rockefeller University, National Medal of Science recipient	
Ruth O. Selig	2007	anthropologist and educator	
George Dudley Seymour	1897	Historian, patent attorney, antiquarian, author, and city planner	
Nathaniel Shaler	1885	geologist; dean Lawrence Scientific School; professor geology, Harvard University	
Homer L. Shantz		botanist and president of the University of Arizona	
Willis Shapley		NASA administrator	
Samuel Shellabarger	1881–1884	Lawyer and congressman	
Seth Shepard	1903	associate justice and chief justice Supreme Court District of Columbia	
Charles Wesley Shilling		U.S. Navy physician, researcher, and educator	
Robert Wilson Shufeldt	1889–1895	diplomate, Rear Admiral U.S. Navy	
Robert Wilson Shufeldt Jr.	1881	osteologist, myologist, museologist and ethnographer	
Frederick Lincoln Siddons		associate justice of the Supreme Court of the District of Columbia	
Louis A. Simon		architect	
James B. Simpson	1991	journalist, author, and Episcopal priest	
Fred Singer	1957	physicist, director of the Science & Environmental Policy Project, professor University of Virginia	
Jeanne Sinkford	2015	Dentist, first female dean of an American college	
Denis Sinor		Historian and academic	
John Sinkankas		Navy officer, aviator, gemologist, and gem carver	
William W. Skinner		chemist, conservationist, and college football coach	
Edwin Emery Slosson		First director of Science Service, magazine editor, author, journalist, and chemist	
John Humphrey Small		attorney and a U.S. Representative from North Carolina	
Timothy Smiddy		Economist, academic, and diplomat	
Thomas Smillie	1888	photographer and curator, Smithsonian Institution	
Delos H. Smith		architect	
Erwin Frink Smith	1891	plant pathologist, U.S. Department of Agriculture	
George P. Smith II		academic	
George Otis Smith	1900	geologist and director of the U.S. Geological Survey	
Goldwin Smith	1892–1900	historian and journalist, college professor	
Hugh McCormick Smith	1903	ichthyologist and administrator in the United States Bureau of Fisheries	
John Bernhardt Smith	1886–1889	professor of entomology, assistant U.S. National Museum	
Philip Sidney Smith		Geologist, chief Alaskan geologist, U.S. Geodetic Survey	
Constantine Joseph Smyth		Chief Justice of the Court of Appeals of the District of Columbia.	
Thorvald Solberg		first Register of Copyrights in the United States Copyright Office	
Addison E. Southard		Diplomat, businessman, chief of the Division of Commercial Activities	
Ellis Spear	1896	lawyer, U.S. Commissioner of Patents, brevet brigadier general U.S. Army	
Arthur Coe Spencer	1898	geologist, U.S. Geological Survey	
Ainsworth Rand Spofford	1884–1889	journalist, author, Librarian of Congress	
Josiah Edward Spurr	1903	geologist, U.S. Geological Survey	
Thorvald Solberg	1887	Register of Copyrights, Library of Congress	
George Owen Squier	1900	major, U.S. Army Signal Corps; scientist, and inventor	
Wendell Phillips Stafford		associate justice of the Vermont Supreme Court and the Supreme Court of the District of Columbia.	
Paul Carpenter Standley		botanist	
Timothy Willam Stanton	1894	paleontologist, U.S. Geological Survey	
Robert Stead	1888	architect	
Robert Edwards Carter Stearns	1884–1891	paleontologist, U.S. Geological Survey; assistant curator U.S. National Museum	
Leonhard Stejneger		curator of biology U.S. National Museum; ornithologist, herpetologist, and zoologist	
George Miller Sternberg	1893	Surgeon General of the U.S. Army; bacteriologist	
J. Macbride Sterrett	1892	professor of philosophy, Columbian University	
Irwin Stelzer		Economist and columnist	
James Stevenson	1884	executive officer, U.S. Geological Survey	
Julian Steward		anthropologist	
William Mott Steuart	1903	director U.S. Census Office	
Moses T. Stevens	1893	Congressman and textile manufacturer	
Frederick W. Stevens		physicist	
Walter W. Stewart		Economist, Director of Research for the Federal Reserve Board	
Charles Wardell Stiles	1892	parasitologist and zoologist, Bureau of Animal Industry	
Frank R. Stockton	1900	author, humorist	
Alfred Holt Stone	1902	Cotton planter, writer, politician	
John Stone Stone		mathematician	
Samuel A. Stouffer		sociologist	
Ellery Cory Stowell		diplomat, professor of international law at Columbia University and American University	
Samuel Wesley Stratton	1901	physicist and the first head of the National Bureau of Standards	
Oscar Straus	1900	diplomat, U.S. Secretary of Commerce and Labor	
Thomas Hale Streets	1881–1889	Surgeon, U. S. Navy	
Walter Tennyson Swingle	1899–1902	botanist; agricultural explorer, U.S. Department of Agriculture	
Barbara B. Taft	1988	historian and fellow in the Royal Historical Society	
William Howard Taft	1904–1913/30	President of the United States	
Charles Sumner Tainter	1882–1886, 1891	inventor of the Graphophone	
Gerald F. Tape		physicist	
Albert H. Taylor		electircal and radio engineer	
James Henry Taylor		mathematician	
Frederick Winslow Taylor	1880–1893	chemist, U.S. National Museum; mechanical engineer	
Henry Clay Taylor	1880–1910	rear admiral in the United States Navy	
James Knox Taylor	1898	supervising architect, U.S. Treasury Department	
Rufus Thayer	1885	judge	
Charles Thom		microbiologist, U.S. Bureau of Chemistry	
Almon Harris Thompson	1882	geographer, U.S. Geological Survey	
Robert E. Thompson		Political writer and journalist	
John J. Tigert		Educator and university president	
Samuel Escue Tillman	1889	superintendent of the United States Military Academy, astronomer, engineer	
Otto Hilgard Tittmann	1878–1880, 1884	founder, National Geographic Society; superintendent United States Coast and Geodetic Survey	
Charles Hook Tompkins		architect	
James Toumey	1899–1902	Professor at the Yale School of Forestry, superintendent of Tree-Planting, Division of Forestry	
Charles Haskins Townsend	1897	zoologist and director of the New York Aquarium	
Clinton Paul Townsend	1896	chemist; Patent Office examiner	
Richard W. Townshend	1881–1885	congressman	
William L. Trenholm	1887–1901	United States Comptroller of the Currency	
Horace M. Trent		physicist	
Alfred Charles True	1896	director experiment stations, U.S. Department of Agriculture	
Frederick W. True	1882	head curator department of biology, U.S. National Museum	
Henry St. George Tucker III		Lawyer and congressman	
Bryant Tuckerman		mathematician	
Lucius Tuckerman	1887	businessman, manufacturer, vice-president of the Metropolitan Museum of Art	
John Tukey	1955	statistician with Bell Labs and Princeton University, National Medal of Science recipient	
Charles Yardley Turner	1910–1918	artist	
Henry Ward Turner	1990–1996	geologist, U.S. Geological Survey	
Scott Turner		mining engineer, director of the United States Bureau of Mines	
Merle Tuve		geophysicist	
Frank Tweedy	1885–1901	botanist, topographer with the U.S. Geological Survey	
Sanford J. Ungar	1980	university president	
Harold Urey		physical chemist, Nobel Prize in Chemistry	
Charles Fox Urquhart	1895	topographer and administrator with the U.S. Geological Survey	
Charles R. Van Hise	1890	geologist, academic and president of the University of Wisconsin	
John van Schaick Jr.		clergyman and editor	
Frank A. Vanderlip	1897	Assistant Secretary of the Treasury; president of the National City Bank of New York	
T. Wayland Vaughan	1897	geologist, U. S. Geological Survey and U.S. National Museum; director, Scripps Institution of Oceanography	
Victor C. Vaughan		physician, medical researcher, educator, and academic administrator	
Herman Knickerbocker Vielé	1887–1892	Novelist, short story writer, and poet	
Herbert Elijah Wadsworth	1903	Businessman, politician, and philanthropist	
Elwood Otto Wagenhurst	1903	lawyer, football coach	
Charles Doolittle Walcott	1883	director, U.S. Geological Survey; administrator of the Smithsonian Institution	
Patricia Wald	1988	chief judge, U.S. Court of Appeals for the District of Columbia	
Francis Amasa Walker	1879–1882	superintendent of the U.S. Census Bureau	
Thomas Walsh	1900	mining engineer who discovered one of the largest gold mines in America	
Clyde W. Warburton		Director of Extension Work of the United States Department of Agriculture	
Lester Frank Ward	1878	paleobotanist with the U.S. Geological Survey and American Museum of Natural History	
Samuel Gray Ward	1887–1890	banker, poet, author, and co-founder of the Metropolitan Museum of Art	
Eugene Fitch Ware	1902	Commissioner of Pensions	
Frank Julian Warne	1911–1948	Journalist, economist, and statistician	
Everett Warner	1943–1963	artist	
Edward Wight Washburn		Chemist, chief of the Division of Chemistry of the U.S. Bureau of Standards	
Wilcomb E. Washburn	1965–1997	historian	
Walter Washington	1969–2004	Mayor of the District of Columbia	
Alan Tower Waterman		physicist	
J. Elfreth Watkins	1888	superintendent and curator of mechanical technology, U.S. National Museum	
David K. Watson	1901–1902	Lawyer and congressman	
Christopher Weaver	2005	software developer and educator at MIT	
William Benning Webb	1887	President of the Board of Commissioners District of Columbia, lawyer	
Joseph Weber		physicist, University of Maryland professor	
Frank E. Webner		Consulting cost accountant, early management author, industrial engineer	
Hutton Webster		Sociologist, author	
Sidney Weintraub		economist	
Philip A. Welker		geodetic engineer and civil engineer with the United States Coast and Geodetic Survey	
James Clarke Welling	1878	president of Columbian University, co-founder of National Geographic Society.	
Volkmar Wentzel		photographer and cinematographer with National Geographic	
Alexander Wetmore		ornithologist and avian paleontologist	
William F. Wharton	1884	jurist, Assistant Secretary of State	
Andrew Dickson White	1896	U.S. Ambassador to Germany, historian, co-founder and president of Cornell University	
Charles Abiathar White	1882–1902	geologist and paleontologist	
David White	1882	geologist, U.S. Geological Survey	
Frank White		Treasurer of the United States; Governor of North Dakota	
Gilbert F. White		Geographer, the father of floodplain management	
William Alanson White		neurologist and psychiatrist	
William Allen White		newspapers editor and winner of the Pulitzer Prize	
William Whiting II	1888–1889	politician, congressman	
Beniah Longley Whitman	1895–1900	president Columbian University	
Henry Howard Whitney	1899–1902	brigadier general, U.S. Army	
Milton Whitney	1894	academic and chief, Division of Soils, U.S. Department of Agriculture	
Frederick W. Whitridge	1883–1884	lawyer, president of the Third Avenue Railway Company	
John Brewer Wight	1902	president of the Board of Commissioners of the District of Columbia	
Harvey Washington Wiley	1883–1930	chief chemist, U.S. Department of Agriculture; author of Pure Food and Drug Act	
Walter Francis Willcox	1899	statistician, U.S. Census Bureau; professor at Cornell University	
Maynard Owen Williams		National Geographic foreign correspondent	
Whiting Williams		co-founder of Welfare Federation of Cleveland (predecessor to United Way)	
James Alexander Williamson	1886–1887	commissioner, United States General Land Office; brigadier general U.S. Army	
Bailey Willis	1896	geologist, U.S. Geological Survey	
Edwin Willits	1889–1894	Assistant Secretary of Agriculture and congressman	
Westel W. Willoughby	1894–1895	professor political science, Johns Hopkins University	
William F. Willoughby	1895	author and expert, U.S. Department of Labor	
William Holland Wilmer	1896	ophthalmologist; founding director, Wilmer Eye Institute at Johns Hopkins University	
Jeremiah M. Wilson	1883	educator, lawyer, jurist, and congressman	
M. L. Wilson		professor, undersecretary of agriculture the U.S. Department of Agriculture	
Thomas Wilson	1887	anthropologist; curator prehistoric archaeology, U.S. National Museum	
William Lyne Wilson	1895	Postmaster General, president Washington and Lee University	
Woodrow Wilson	1913–1924	President of the United States	
Robert Watson Winston		Lawyer, judge, and author	
Leonard Wood	1895–1897	U.S. Army major general, military governor of Cuba, Governor-General of the Philippines.	
Robert Morse Woodbury		Economist, academic, author, and chief statistician of the International Labor Office in Geneva	
Albert Fred Woods	1896	botanist with the U.S. Department of Agriculture, professor of forestry, university president	
Robert Simpson Woodward	1885	Professor of mechanics and mathematical physics, Columbia University	
William Creighton Woodward	1995	medical doctor and lawyer, legislative counsel for the American Medical Association	
John Maynard Woodworth	1878	surgeon general, Marine Hospital Service	
Alma S. Woolley		nurse, nurse educator, nursing historian, and author	
Herman Wouk		writer and winner of the Pulitzer Prize	
Carroll D. Wright	1895	Statistician and first U.S. Commissioner of Labor	
Nathan C. Wyeth	1900	architect, supervising architect for the U.S. Treasury	
Walter Wyman	1889	supervising surgeon general, Public Health and Marine Hospital Service	
Robert Sterling Yard		Writer, journalist, editor, and wilderness activist	
H. C. Yarrow	1878–1893	ornithologist, herpetologist, surgeon, curator of reptiles in the U.S. National Museum	
Charles W. Yost	1974–1981	Diplomat, U.S. Ambassador to the United Nations	
Arthur N. Young		Economist and government advisor	
Albert Francis Zahm	1902	academic; chief of the Aeronautical Division of the U.S. Library of Congress	
Estanislao Zeballos	1894–1895	E. E. and M. P. Argentina	
