= Edward Douglas =

Edward Douglas may refer to:

- Edward Douglas (bishop) (1901–1967), Scottish Catholic bishop
- Edward M. Douglas (1903–1983), American businessman
- Edward Bruce Douglas (1886–1946), American sculptor
- Edward Morehouse Douglas (1855–1932), American topographer
- Ed Douglas (born 1966), English writer and journalist
