= Stowell =

Stowell may refer to:

== People ==
- Stowell (surname)
- William Scott, 1st Baron Stowell (1745–1836), English judge, jurist

== Places ==
=== United Kingdom ===
- Stowell, Gloucestershire, England
- Stowell, Somerset, England

=== United States ===
- Stowell, Texas

== Other uses ==
- Stowells, a British wine merchant, now owned by Accolade Wines
