= William Addams Reitwiesner =

American genealogist (1954–2010)

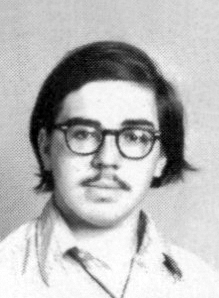
- Reitwiesner in 1971
- Born: March 8, 1954; Havre de Grace, Maryland, U.S.
- Died: November 12, 2010 (aged 56); Washington, D.C., U.S.
- Occupation: Genealogist
- Parents: George Walter Reitwiesner; Homé Stephens McAllister

William Addams Reitwiesner (March 8, 1954 – November 12, 2010) was an American genealogist who traced the ancestry of United States political figures, European royalty and celebrities.

== Biography ==
Reitwiesner was born on March 8, 1954, in Havre de Grace, Maryland, the son of Homé Stephens (McAllister) and George Walter Reitwiesner. He grew up in Aberdeen, Maryland and Silver Spring. His maternal grandfather, Addams Stratton McAllister, was a board member of the National Genealogical Society, and from the age of five, Reitwiesner would explore his grandfather's library.

After graduating from Montgomery Blair High School in 1972, Reitwiesner joined the Library of Congress's Congressional Research Service (CRS) as a cart pusher. He spent the rest of his working life in menial jobs at the Library of Congress so that he could devote his time pursuing his interest in genealogy. Although much of his work was self-published on the internet, he acquired a reputation for meticulousness and accuracy and many genealogists cited him in their publications.

He died of cancer in Washington, D.C. on November 12, 2010.

== Works and publications ==
Genealogies that Reitwiesner published include:

=== Print ===
- William Addams Reitwiesner (1981). The American Ancestors and Relatives of Lady Diana Frances Spencer. Silver Spring, MD: Self Published. OCLC 11840295.
- William Addams Reitwiesner; Gary Boyd Roberts (1984). American Ancestors and Cousins of the Princess of Wales. Genealogical Publishing Company. OCLC 1102303850.
- Gary B. Roberts; William A. Reitwiesner (1984). American ancestors and cousins of the Princess of Wales : the New England, Mid-Atlantic, and Virginia forebears, near relatives, and notable distant kinsmen, through her American great-grandmother, of Lady Diana Frances Spencer, now Her Royal Highness the Princess of Wales. Baltimore, MD: Genealogical Publishing Company. OCLC 241576496.
- William Addams Reitwiesner (1989). Matrilineal descents of the European royalty : a work in progress. Washington, D.C.: William Addams Reitwiesner. OCLC 723183420.
- William Addams Reitwiesner (1989). Matrilineal descents of the European royalty. Introduction; Who is Prince Frederick von Anhalt?. OCLC 23709278.
- William Addams Reitwiesner (1990). Reitwiesner families in the United States : a preliminary report. Washington D.C.: William Addams Reitwiesner. OCLC 54388929.
- William Addams Reitwiesner (1990). Consolidated index to the Neue Folge of Europaische Stammtafeln (Stammtafeln zur Geschichte der europäischen Staaten). unknown: unknown. OCLC 982380719.
- William Addams Reitwiesner (1993). Matrilineal descents of the European royalty. Washington, D.C.: unknown. OCLC 1099887518.
- William Addams Reitwiesner (1994). Matrilineal ancestry of the matrilineal descents : supplemental volume to the fourth edition, revised of matrilineal descents of the European royalty. Washington, D.C.: William Addams Reitwiesner. OCLC 1126332869.
- William Addams Reitwiesner (1995). The Lesbian Ancestors of Prince Rainier of Monaco, Dr. Otto von Habsburg, Brooke Shields, and the Marquis de Sade. Washington, D.C.: William Addams Reitwiesner. OCLC 35910454.
- William Addams Reitwiesner (1997). Matrilineal descents of the European royalty : a work in progress. Washington, D.C.: William Addams Reitwiesner. OCLC 37654964.
- William Addams Reitwiesner (2004). The ancestors of Senator John Forbes Kerry (b. 1943). Lansing, Michigan. OCLC 75183242.
- William Addams Reitwiesner (2011). The Ancestry of Catherine Middleton: Who Will Marry Prince William of Wales 29 April 2011. Boston, MA: New England Historic Genealogical Society. OCLC 711076159.
- Charles M. Marsteller; William Addams Reitwiesner; Linda Davis Reno; Mike Marshall (2015). St. Mary's Co, MD: ancestry of President Barak Obama (b. 1961). San Francisco, CA: William Addams Reitwiesner. OCLC 921887130.

=== Online ===
Although Reitwiesner's original website is now in abeyance (www.wargs.com), much of his research that was published online can still be accessed using archive websites. This research includes:

- Ancestries of Barack Obama, Joe Biden, George W. Bush, Dick Cheney, Bill Clinton, Al Gore and other U.S. political figures.
- Descendants of Bonnie Prince Charlie.
- The Ancestry of Camilla Parker Bowles, now the Queen of the United Kingdom.
- The Ancestry of Mary Donaldson, now the Queen of Denmark.
- The Ancestry of Queen Silvia of Sweden.
- Ancestries of David Cameron, Nicolas Sarkozy and other prominent European figures.
- British Line of Succession.

He prefaced his genealogy of Barack Obama with the text

"The following material on the immediate ancestry of Barack Obama should not be considered either exhaustive or authoritative, but rather as a first draft."

Most of his Internet publications carry similar disclaimers.

Publications where his assistance or publications have been acknowledged include:

- Williamson's work on the ancestry of Diana, Princess of Wales
