= Emil Alexander de Schweinitz =

American bacteriologist

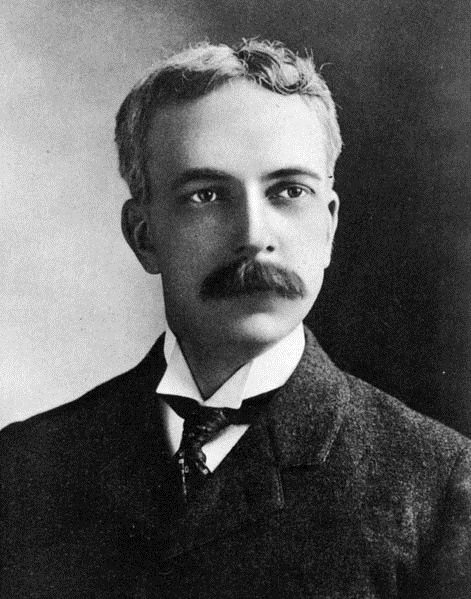
- Born: January 18, 1866; Salem, North Carolina, U.S.
- Died: February 15, 1904 (aged 38); Washington, D.C., U.S.
- Scientific career
- Fields: Bacteriology

Emil Alexander de Schweinitz (January 18, 1866 – February 15, 1904) was an American bacteriologist.

== Early life and education ==
He was born in Salem, North Carolina, and was the son of Moravian Bishop Emil de Schweinitz. He attended Nazareth Hall in Nazareth, Pennsylvania and Moravian College in Bethlehem, Pennsylvania, and received a Ph.D. from the University of North Carolina in 1882 and another from Göttingen in 1886.

== Career ==
After returning to the United States, he taught chemistry in Tufts College, Massachusetts, and then became a professor of chemistry at the Agricultural and Mechanical College of Kentucky. After becoming associated with the chemical division of the Agricultural Department, Washington, D.C. in 1888, he was appointed as director of the biochemical laboratory of the department's Bureau of Animal Industry in 1890, a position he remained in until his death. He was a member of the American Public Health Association from 1896. He was also chair of chemistry and toxicology in the Columbian University and later its dean.

He specialized in bacteria and immunity, and studied the bacterial products of tuberculosis, hog cholera and glanders. Among other essays, he published Laboratory Guide (1898).

de Schweinitz was elected to the American Philosophical Society in 1912.

== Personal life ==
He lived at 1023 Vermont Avenue, in Washington, D.C., where he was a member of the Chevy, Cosmos, and Metropolitan Clubs.

== Death ==
He died suddenly of uremia in 1904 at age 38.

== Works ==
- A Chemical Study of the Osage Orange as a Substitute for the Mulberry in rearing Silkworms (1889)
- The Poisons produced by the Hog Cholera Germ (1890)
- The Production of Immunity to Swine Plague by Use of the Products of the Germ (1891)
- The Use of Mallein and its Active Principles (1892)
- A Preliminary Study of the Poisons of the Tuberculosis Bacillus and the Practical Value and Use of Tuberculin (1892)
- Artificial Media for Bacterial Cultures (1893)
- The Effect of Tuberculin on the Milk of Cows (1894)
- The Chemical Composition of the Tuberculosis and Glanders Bacilli (1895)
- A Hygienic Study of Oleomargarine (1896)
- The War with the Microbes (1897)
