= Metropolitan Club (Washington, D.C.) =

Private social club in Washington, D.C.

- The Metropolitan Club of the City of Washington
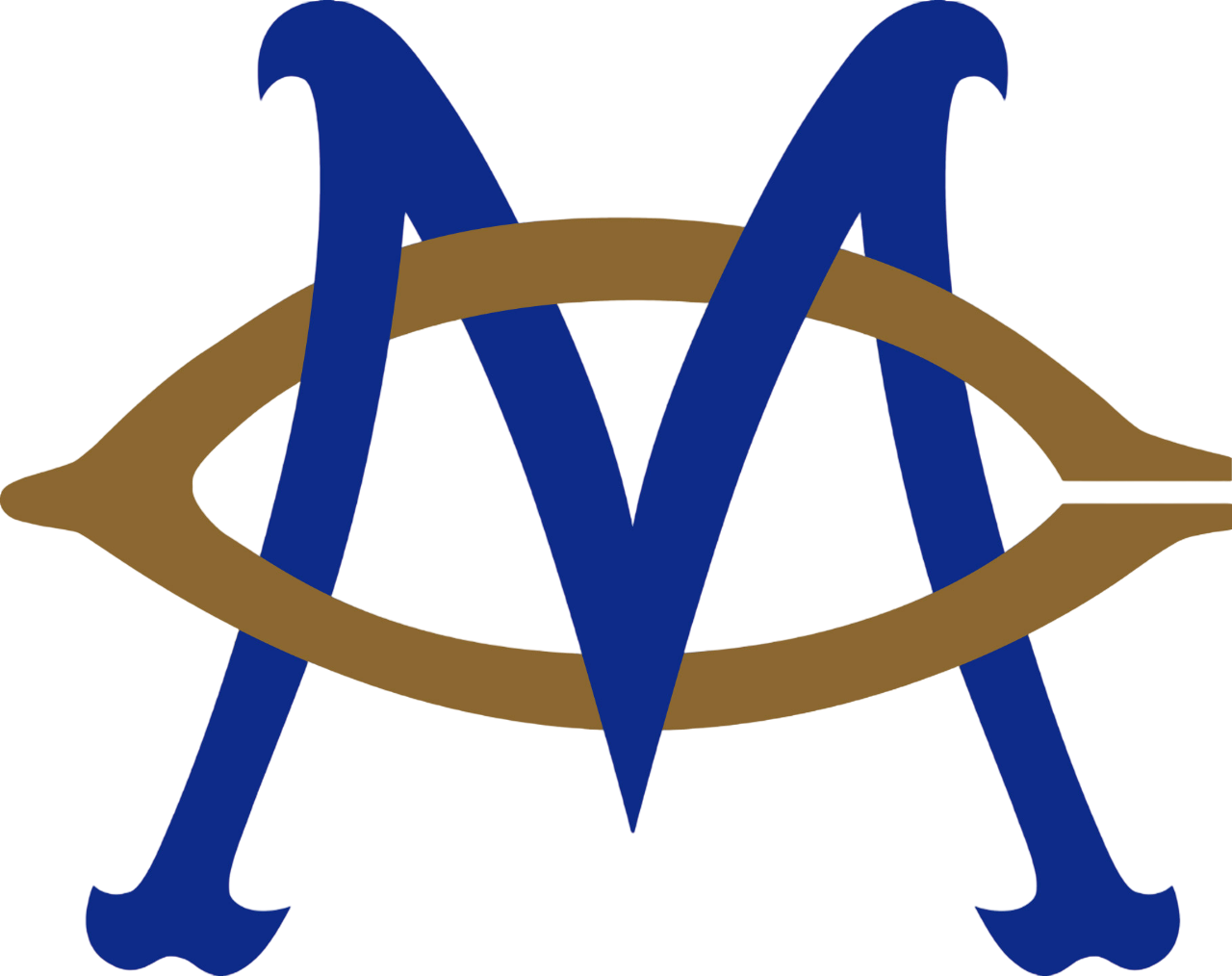
- Crest of the Metropolitan Club

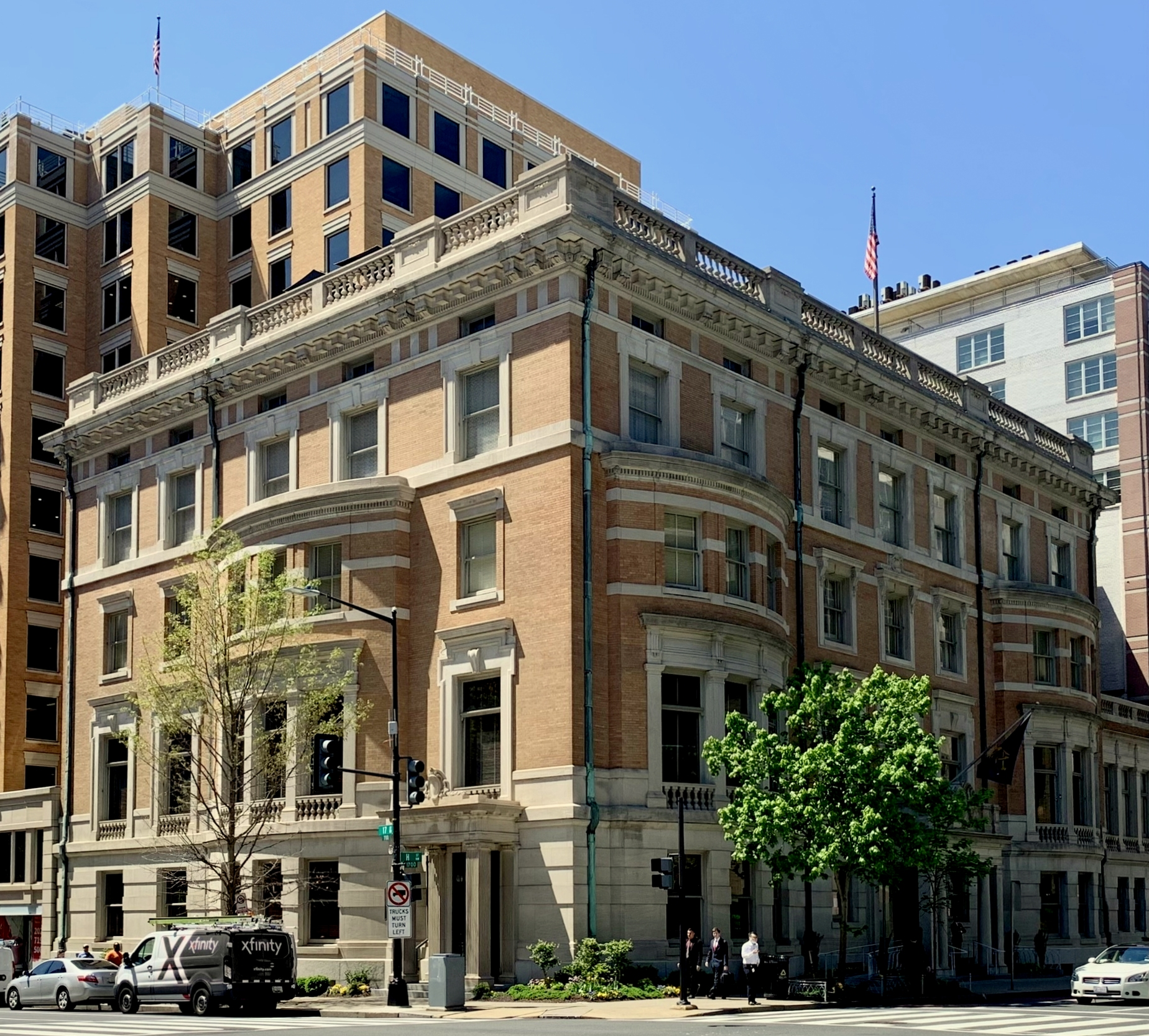
- Metropolitan Club in 2022
- Formation: October 13, 1863; 162 years ago
- Type: Private
- Tax ID no.: 53-0109340
- Headquarters: 1700 H Street NW, Washington, D.C., U.S.
- Location: United States
- Website: metroclub.com
- Metropolitan Club
- U.S. National Register of Historic Places
- Architect: Heins & LaFarge
- NRHP reference No.: 95000441

The Metropolitan Club of the City of Washington is a private club in Washington, D.C. In September 1983, The New York Times called it "Washington's oldest and most exclusive club".

The Metropolitan Club of the City of Washington operates under laws for 501(c)(7) Social and Recreation Clubs. In 2025 it claimed total revenue of $15,735,739 and total assets of $35,096,998. The Metropolitan Club Preservation Foundation at the same address is a 501(c)(3) Public Charity. In 2025 it claimed $946,366 in total revenue and $2,077,425 in total assets.

== History ==
=== 19th century ===
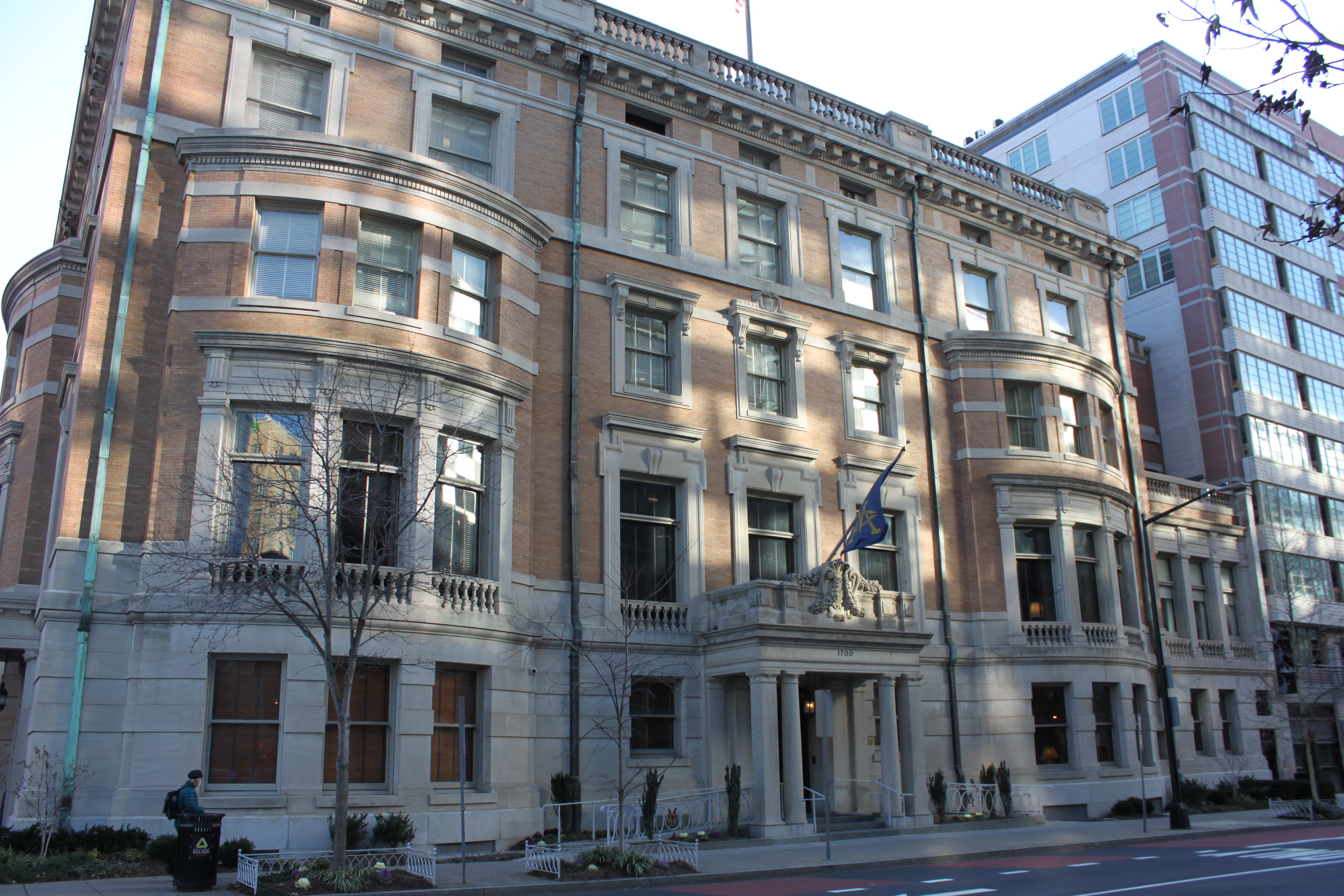
The entrance to the Metropolitan Club

On October 1, 1863, six U.S. Treasury Department officials met to discuss the creation of a social and literary club in Washington, D.C. The Metropolitan Club officially organized twelve days later, with 43 members. The first year, dues were $50.

On June 25, 1883, the club acquired a lot on the corner of H Street and 17th Streets for $10. Later In 1883, the club moved into the first purpose-built structure for a club in Washington, D.C. Designed by the architects W. Bruce Gray and Harvey L. Page, the Victorian-style, four-story building was destroyed in a fire in 1904. From 1905 to 1908, the Metropolitan Club met in various rental properties.

The club's current home, designed by the architectural firm of Heins & LaFarge of New York City, was built from 1904 to 1908.

The brick and limestone Renaissance revival-styble building was rebuilt on the 1700 H Street NW lot, two blocks from the White House. In 1925, a two-story annex designed by Frederick H. Brooke of Donn and Deming was added.

Inside the five-story building, there is a lobby, coat room, card room, a library with 15,000 books, a grill room, a lounge, a dining room, sleeping quarters, and a barbershop. There is also a steam room, an exercise room, and two squash courts. Another room serves as a museum, honoring the governors. Other spaces are for offices, the kitchen, and the wine cellar.

In 1898, Theodore Roosevelt plotted much of the Spanish–American War at the club.

=== 20th century ===
During the Watergate scandal, Henry Kissinger regularly met New York Times journalist James Reston at the club. To ensure confidentiality of such meetings, the club prohibits the use of cell phones or note taking at the tables.

The Metropolitan Club building was listed on the District of Columbia Inventory of Historic Sites since 1964 and it was listed on the National Register of Historic Places in 1995.

=== 21st century ===
In April 2021, the club opened a new open-air rooftop venue, an $11 million project. The space is used for live music, private functions, and smoking cigars.

== Reciprocal clubs ==
The Metropolitan Club has reciprocal agreements with the following:

- Boodle's (London)
- Brooks's (London)
- Cercle Royal du Parc (Brussels)
- Círculo de Armas (Buenos Aires)
- Circolo della Caccia (Rome)
- Jockey Club (Paris)
- Jockey Club für Österreich (Vienna)
- Knickerbocker Club (New York)
- Nuevo Club (Madrid)
- Somerset Club (Boston)
- Union Club (New York)

== Membership ==
Members are essentially scions of the East Coast American aristocracy, mainly the First Families of Virginia, the Boston Brahmins, the Old Philadelphians, and the Knickerbocker families of New York.

For the first century of its existence, the club was closed to non-white people as members. Thirty club members quit in protest in 1961, including Attorney General Robert F. Kennedy. The club started accepting black members in 1972; the first black member it admitted was Bishop John T. Walker. The club also did not allow women to join until 1988.

In 1983, there was a five-year waiting list for membership.

== Notable members ==
- Dean Acheson, 51st U.S. Secretary of State
- Robert J. Atkinson, politician
- George Bancroft, historian and 17th U.S. Secretary of the Navy
- Edward Fitzgerald Beale, ambassador, explorer, and surveyor
- Francis Biddle, attorney general and Nuremberg trials judge
- Montgomery Blair, politician, lawyer, and U.S. Postmaster General
- Rupert Blue, fourth U.S. Surgeon General
- Phillip Bonsal, U.S. ambassador to Cuba
- Stephen Bonsal, journalist and diplomat
- Arnaud de Borchgrave, journalist
- David K.E. Bruce, diplomat
- Edward Burling, attorney
- Tucker Carlson, journalist
- John Lee Carroll, governor of Maryland
- Salmon P. Chase, treasury secretary and chief justice
- Lucius Eugene Chittenden, register of the treasury
- Spencer M. Clark, superintendent of the National Currency Bureau
- William T. Coleman, transportation secretary
- William Wilson Corcoran, banker and art collector
- Viscomte Henri de Sibour, architect
- George Dewey, admiral of the Navy
- T. Coleman du Pont, U.S. Senator
- Allen Dulles, CIA director
- William Crowninshield Endicott, Secretary of War
- Rowland Evans, journalist
- James V. Forrestal, defense secretary
- B. B. French, politician
- Hugh S. Gibson, diplomat
- George H. Goodrich, judge
- James Lorimer Graham Jr., attorney
- Katharine Graham, publisher
- Ulysses S. Grant, 18th President of the United States and Union Army general
- Cary T. Grayson, physician
- Joseph C. Grew, ambassador
- Warren G. Harding, president
- John Hay, secretary of state
- James L. Holloway III, admiral
- Herbert Hoover, president
- Hallett Johnson, ambassador
- Reverdy Johnson, politician
- William Hemphill Jones, politician
- Edward Jordan, solicitor of the treasury
- John F. Kennedy, president
- Jerome H. Kidder, surgeon and astronomer
- Henry Kissinger, diplomat and statesman
- Philander Chase Knox, secretary of state
- Ward H. Lamon, marshal of Washington
- William Henry Fitzhugh Lee, congressman
- Joseph J. Lewis, IRS commissioner
- Robert Todd Lincoln, ambassador and secretary of war
- Walter Lippman, journalist
- Henry Cabot Lodge, statesman
- Nicholas Longworth III, speaker of the House
- Henry Loomis, director of Voice of America and president of the Corp. for Public Broadcasting
- Arthur MacArthur Jr., general
- Alfred Thayer Mahan, historian and naval theorist
- George C. Marshall, secretary of state
- John J. McCloy, chairman of the World Bank
- Robert McNamara, defense secretary, president of the World Bank
- Aziz Mekouar, ambassador
- Andrew Mellon, Treasury Secretary and philanthropist
- Paul Mellon, horse breeder and philanthropist
- Livingston T. Merchant, ambassador
- Nelson Appleton Miles, general
- J. P. Morgan, financier
- Henry Morgenthau Jr., treasury secretary
- Francis G. Newlands, senator
- Kichisaburo Nomura, Japanese ambassador
- Edwin B. Parker (1868–1929), head, priorities division, War Industries Board
- John J. Pershing, General of the Armies
- John E. Pillsbury, rear admiral
- David Dixon Porter, admiral
- James "Scotty" Reston, journalist
- George Washington Riggs, banker
- Franklin D. Roosevelt, president
- Theodore Roosevelt, president
- Elihu Root, secretary of state
- John McAllister Schofield, secretary of war
- Alexander Shepherd, governor of Washington, D.C.
- John Sherman, senator
- William Tecumseh Sherman, general
- John G. Stephenson, librarian of Congress
- William Howard Taft, president and chief justice
- Richard Wallach, mayor of Washington, D.C.
- John T. Walker, bishop
- James M. Wayne, supreme court justice
- George Washington Vanderbilt II, art collector
- James W. Wadsworth, senator
- William B. Webb, politician, chief of police in Washington D.C.
- George Peabody Wetmore, governor of Rhode Island
- Henry White, ambassador, and one of the signers of the Treaty of Versailles
- John Lorimer Worden, rear admiral
