= Eugene Thomas Allen =

American pioneer of geochemistry (1864–1964)

Eugene Thomas Allen (2 April 1864 – 17 July 1964) was an American pioneer of geochemistry who worked at the Geophysical Laboratory of the Carnegie Institution.

Allen was born to Frederick and Harriet Augusta (born Thomas) in Athol, Massachusetts. He received an AB from Amherst College 1887 and studied chemistry at Johns Hopkins University, receiving a PhD in 1892. He taught chemistry at the University of Colorado (1892–1893) and at the Missouri School of Mines (1895–1901). From 1879 he collaborated with G.F. Becker and Carl Barus at the newly founded US Geological Survey to study the chemistry of rocks. In 1906 he moved to the Geophysical Laboratory of the Carnegie Institution of Washington established in the previous year with Arthur Louis Day as director.

Allen worked on silicate minerals which included experimental synthetic approaches in petrological studies. In 1925 Allen and Day worked on geysers and hot springs of Yellowstone.

Allen married Harriet Doughty at Arlington in 1896. He was a member of the Cosmos Club.
