= Stowell (surname) =

Stowell is a surname, and may refer to:

- Austin Stowell (born 1984), American actor
- Belinda Stowell (born 1971), Australian sailor
- Blake Stowell, director of corporate communications for The SCO Group
- Brian Stowell (1936–2019), Manx language activist
- Bruce Stowell (born 1941), English football player and manager
- Christopher Stowell (born 1966), American ballet dancer and choreographer
- Dennis E. Stowell (1944–2011), American politician and chemical engineer
- Ellery Cory Stowell (1875–1958), professor of international law
- Hugh Stowell (1799–1865), Church of England clergyman
- Jay Samuel Stowell (1883–1966), American Methodist author
- Joe Stowell (1926–2026), American college basketball coach and broadcaster
- John Stowell (born 1950), American jazz guitarist
- John M. Stowell (1824–1907), American politician, Mayor of Milwaukee
- John Stowell (MP) (fl. 1369–1402), English merchant and Member of Parliament
- Joseph Stowell (born 1944), president of Cornerstone University and author
- Kathryn Stowell, New Zealand academic
- Louise Reed Stowell (1850–1932), American scientist, author
- Mike Stowell (born 1965), English football goalkeeper
- M. Louise Stowell (1861–1930), American painter and illustrator
- Rachel Stowell (born 1977), English football player
- Theodore Stowell (1847–1916), president of Bryant College
- Thomas Blanchard Stowell (1846–1927), teacher, scientist
- Rachel Stowell (1846–1927), teacher, scientist
- Thomas E. A. Stowell (1885–1970), surgeon
- Thomas Stowell (1764–1821), Manx lawyer
- Tina Stowell, Baroness Stowell of Beeston (born 1967), British Conservative politician
- Walton Danforth Stowell (1936–2009), American architect and historic preservationist
- Warren Stowell (born 1941), American businessman, teacher, and politician
- William Stowell (actor) (1885–1919), American silent film actor
- William Hendry Stowell (1800–1858), Manx nonconformist minister
- William Rufus Rogers Stowell (1822-1901), American Mormon pioneer
- William Henry Harrison Stowell (1840–1922), American congressman, merchant and industrialist
