= George Wesson Hawes =

American geologist (1848–1882)

- Born: December 31, 1848; Marion, Indiana, U.S.
- Died: June 22, 1882 (aged 33); Manitou Springs, Colorado, U.S.
- Resting place: Worcester, Massachusetts, U.S.
- Education: Yale University; University of Heidelberg (PhD)
- Occupations: Geologist; educator
- Relatives: Ainsworth Rand Spofford (uncle)

George Wesson Hawes (December 31, 1848 – June 22, 1882) was an American geologist and writer. He was director of the geological department of the National Museum of Natural History in Washington, D.C., from 1881 to his death in 1882.

== Early life and education ==
George Wesson Hawes was born on December 31, 1848, in Marion, Indiana, to Alfred Hawes. His father was a pastor of the Presbyterian church. Hawes parents died when he was young. Hawes spent his youth in Worcester. He then studied at the Sheffield Scientific School of Yale University from 1865 to 1867. He conducted business in Boston. He then returned to Yale in 1871 and graduated in 1872.

Following graduation, Hawes assisted Professor Samuel William Johnson in the chemical laboratory. He continued working as an assistant and instructor in mineralogy and blowpipe analysis at the Sheffield Scientific School for six years. Hawes wrote and published a report in 1878 on the mineralogy and lithology of New Hampshire. In the summer of 1878, he studied in Breslau for six months. In March 1879, he studied in Bonn and Heidelberg. He graduated with a PhD from University of Heidelberg in the summer of 1880.

== Career ==
Following his graduation from Heidelberg, Hawes returned to New Haven, Connecticut. In February 1881, he became director of the geological department of the National Museum of Natural History in Washington, D.C. He remained there until his death.

== Personal life ==
Hawes did not marry. His uncle was Ainsworth Rand Spofford, librarian of the U.S. Congress.

According to his obituary, Hawes overworked himself in early 1881 while conducting an investigation for work. He died on June 22, 1882, in Manitou Springs, Colorado. He was buried in Worcester.

== Publications ==
- The Geology of New Hampshire (contributor)
- Mineralogy (contributor)
- Geology (by the Smithsonian Institution) (contributor)
