= Julius Kaplan =

American art historian

Julius D. Kaplan is an American art historian who in 1999 was appointed professor of art at California State University. He studied the art of Gustave Moreau, and published two books on the subject.

== Selected publications ==
- "The religious subjects of James Ensor, 1877-1900", Revue Belge d'Archéologie et d'Histoire de l'Art, 1966.
- "Gustave Moreau's 'Jupiter and Semele'." Art Quarterly, 33 (1970), pp. 393–414.
- The art of Gustave Moreau: Theory, style and content. Columbia University, New York, 1972.
- Gustave Moreau. Los Angeles County Museum of Art & New York Graphic Society, Los Angeles & New York, 1974. ISBN 0821206281
- Symbolism: Europe and America at the end of the nineteenth century. An exhibition at the Art Gallery California State College, San Bernardino, April 27 - June 10, 1980. California State College, 1980. ISBN 978-0945486008
- Kate Steinitz art and collection: Avant garde art in Germany in the 1920s and 1930s. San Bernardino State College, 1982. ISBN 978-0945486015
