= Edward M. Douglas =

American businessman (1903–1983)

Edward Mills Douglas (1903–1983) was a businessman. Douglas served as a senior executive at IBM in multiple roles during a 25-year career at the company. He represented IBM on the Office Equipment Manufacturers Institute (now the Information Technology Industry Council). The Institute elected him its president in 1948.

== Early life and education ==
Douglas was born to Charles Malcolm Douglas and Maude Mills Douglas in New Rochelle, New York on December 21, 1903. He graduated from the Morristown School (now Morristown-Beard School) in Morristown, New Jersey in 1921. Douglas later served as a member of the school's Board of Trustees. In 1925, Douglas completed his bachelor's degree at Harvard University in Cambridge, Massachusetts. During his time at the school, he participated in the Phoenix Club, the Hasty Pudding Institute of 1770, and the Speakers Club. As a freshman, Douglas played on the Harvard Crimson cross country team. After graduating, he joined IBM as a systems sales representative.

== Career at IBM ==
After serving as a systems sales representative in New York City and Newark, New Jersey, Douglas received a promotion to senior sales representative in 1927. He served as divisional manager for IBM's New York City office until IBM named him their first district manager for the New England District in 1935. Three years later, Douglas moved back to New York City after accepting the role of director of sales promotion at the company's world headquarters building.

After he serviced as executive assistant, IBM named Douglas its vice president in charge of sales in 1946. Douglas served in that role until 1952 when he took on the role of vice president of special administrative matters; Louis LaMotte succeeded him as vice president of sales. Douglas retired in 1954. After receiving election to IBM's Board of Directors in 1947, he continued serving in that role until 1959;James Rhyne Killian, Jr., the 10th president of the Massachusetts Institute of Technology, succeeded him on the board. While serving on the board, Douglas served as one of 42 honorary pallbearers at the 1956 tribute to Thomas Watson, Sr.

== Service in New York City ==
While living in New York City, Douglas held several service leadership positions. He chaired the Radio Committee for radio advertising for the American Red Cross's 1944 campaign to raise New York City's share of the $200,000,000 fundraising goal. He also served on the Board of Managers for YMCA's Sloane House and on the industry committee for the U.S. Savings Bond Division of the U.S. Department of the Treasury.

In 1951, Douglas chaired the Office Equipment Committee for the Cerebral Palsy Society of New York's city-wide fundraising campaign. The committee sought to raise money from the office equipment industry to assist the $750,000 campaign. The following year, Doctors Hospital in Manhattan elected him president of their board of directors.

== Family ==
Douglas married Katherine Willauer Douglas in Vineyard Haven, Massachusetts, a community on Martha's Vineyard, on July 7, 1934. His father Charles, the minister at Christ Episcopal Church in Short Hills, New Jersey, officiated the wedding. Douglas and Katherine Douglas had three children together: Malcolm, Katherine, and Elizabeth.
