= Paul D. Foote =

American inventor (1888–1971)

Paul Darwin Foote (March 27, 1888 – August 2, 1971) was a director of research and executive vice president of the Gulf Research and Development company, as well as the United States Assistant Secretary of Defense for Research and Engineering during the Eisenhower administration. He also served as a member of the industrial advisory group of the Atomic Energy Commission. He was an elected member of both the American Philosophical Society and the United States National Academy of Sciences.

== Education ==
Foote received degrees from Adelbert College, the University of Nebraska and the University of Minnesota.

== Notable works ==
Statistics on number of libraries is according to

- The origin of spectra: held in 277 libraries worldwide
- Pyrometric practice: held in 59 libraries worldwide
- A new microphotometer for photographic densities by William Frederick Meggers: held in 17 libraries worldwide
