= Samuel Gannett =

American geographer, topographer and cartographer

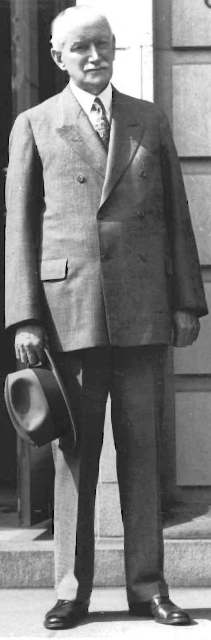
- Born: February 10, 1862; Augusta, Maine
- Died: August 5, 1939 (aged 77); Washington, D.C.
- Education: Bowdoin College, Massachusetts Institute of Technology
- Occupation(s): geographer, topographer, cartographer
- Employer: U.S. Geological Survey
- Known for: co-founding the National Geographic Society
- Relatives: Henry Gannett (cousin)

Samuel Stinson Gannett (February 10, 1861 – August 5, 1939) was an American geographer, topographer, and cartographer. He was born on February 10, 1861, in Augusta, Maine, cousin of Henry Gannett. He attended Bowdoin College, and then MIT.

== Work for US Geological Survey ==
In 1882 he moved to Washington, D.C. to work in the US Geological Survey, and in 1888 co-founded the National Geographic Society. His two most influential surveys were in the 20th century; the first in 1912 to determine Maryland's border with West Virginia, and the second in 1927 on the Red River to determine the border between Texas and Oklahoma. Both involved Supreme Court decisions. He died aged 77 in Sibley Hospital on August 5, 1939.
