= Benjamin F. Hake =

American petroleum geologist

- Born: September 3, 1895; Omaha, Nebraska
- Died: August 5, 1973 (aged 77); Santa Barbara, California
- Education: Stanford University
- Awards: Legion of Merit
- Scientific career
- Fields: Geology
- Workplaces: Marland Oil Company; U.S. Army; Gulf Oil Company

Benjamin F. Hake (September 3, 1895 – August 5, 1973) was an American petroleum geologist who explored the Mexican oil fields in Baja California, the west coast of Mexico, Tamaulipas and Veracruz.

He served in World War I with the ambulance corps and Railway Artillery Reserve in France, and in World War II as an officer with the Canol Project and as an advisor on national petroleum policies. After the war, he worked with Gulf Oil Corporation and became General Manager of Gulf Oil Company of Bolivia.

== Early life and family ==
Hake was born on September 3, 1895, in Omaha, Nebraska, as the son of Benjamin Hake Sr. and Aura Smith Hake. He graduated from Polytechnic High School in Los Angeles and operated a guide and taxi service in Worland, Wyoming, for two years.

In 1916, he was employed as an assistant and guide to Charles Dake on the Wyoming Geological Survey and became interested in geology. During World War I, he was enlisted in the Army Medical Department (United States) and transferred to the Railway Artillery Reserve. At the end of the war, he was honorably discharged from the army with the rank of lieutenant. He studied at Stanford under Bailey Willis and gained an A.B. in geology.

== Career ==
For his first assignment, Hake was hired by Marland Oil Company of Ponca City, Oklahoma, for a year to survey large areas of the west coast of Mexico, including Mazatlan, Puerto Vallarta and Acapulco, as well as Baja California, to ascertain whether there were areas that should be explored in detail. The Mexican Revolution was taking place, and he met some of the generals, slept in the huts of persons affected by the war, and crossed the deserts of Baja on mule-back. He investigated areas in California, Tamaulipas, Vera Cruz, Hudson Bay, Alberta, Saskatchewan and Manitoba.

In 1929, Hake became Managing Director and Chief Geologist for Nordon Corporation in Alberta. His advice was incorporated into the Oil and Gas Conservation Act of Alberta. He moved to the Gulf Oil Company, directing engineering in Michigan, Indiana and several other states. In World War II, he re-joined the Army as a Major and was an advisor on the Canol project, America's first Alaskan pipeline. He worked with the Fuels and Lubricants division of the Office of Quartermaster General and helped with the planning and policy formation for the Petroleum Program. He was promoted to lieutenant colonel and was awarded a Legion of Merit commendation in 1946. After the war, he returned to Gulf Oil Company and spent several years working in the Mediterranean and South America. In the early 1950s, he became General Manager of the Gulf Oil Company of Bolivia. He retired to Santa Barbara, California, in 1959.

Hake was a lecturer and author. He was a member of the Cosmos Club and a fellow of the American Geographical Society. His papers included Scarps of southwestern Sierra Nevada, California: Bulletin of the Geological Society of America, December 1928; and Scientific Manpower and National Safety in the Bulletin of the American Association of Petroleum Geologists in 1956.

== Private life and death ==
Hake married Kirby Ingoldsby, and they remained married until her death in 1966. They had four children and five grandchildren.

Benjamin Franklin Hake died on August 5, 1973, in Santa Barbara, California.
