= Edwin Chesley Estes Lord =

American geologist and petrographer (1868–1954)

- Born: May 7, 1868; Brooklyn, New Tork
- Died: September 25, 1954 (aged 86); Wilmington, Delaware
- Education: Harvard University; Heidelberg University
- Scientific career
- Fields: Geology

Edwin Chesley Estes Lord (May 7, 1868 – September 25, 1954) was an American geologist and petrographer.

== Biography ==
Lord was born in Brooklyn, New York on May 7, 1868. He was educated in the public schools of New York City and in Brunswick and Heidelberg, Germany, and in Harvard University, Cambridge. Received the degrees of Ph.D. (Heidelberg) and M.S. (Harvard).

Lord served as field assistant in the United States Geological Survey, 1895–1897, was professor of Geology and mineralogy in Hamilton College, 1899–1900, Austin Teaching Fellow and assistant in mineralogy and petrography, Harvard University, 1900–1901. He was assistant in petrography and chemistry of the United States Department of Agriculture 1901–1904, and was a petrographer in the office of public roads and rural engineering of the United States Department of Agriculture from 1904.

== Works ==
He published a geological and petrographical paper on igneous rocks from Bavaria, Germany, Mexico, Texas and Maine, 1894–1900. After 1900 has published papers on the petrography of rocks for road building, and the relation of mineral composition and rock structure to the physical properties of road materiala:

- "Bulletins 31 and 37", Office of Public Roads
- "Bulletin 348", United States Department of Agriculture

He also gave a paper on the mineral composition and utilization of blast furnace and other slags, at the Seventh International Congress of Applied Chemistry, 1909.

== Personal life ==
Edwin married Ellen Sinclair Buck on August 31, 1905. He died on September 25, 1954, in Wilmington, Delaware.
