= Stewart Paton =

American psychiatrist and educator

Stewart Paton M.D. (April 19, 1865 – January 7, 1942) was an American psychiatrist and educator.

== Biography ==
Born in New York City in 1865, Stewart Paton graduated from Princeton (1886) and receive his M.D. degree from Columbia three years later. He lectured for a time at Columbia and Yale University. Paton was a member of the American Philosophical Society, the New York Academy of Medicine, and the Harvey Society. He was a leading eugenicist of his day and president of the Eugenics Research Association. Paton was a strong advocate of American entry into World War I. Paton opposed the right of Conscientious objection, arguing in an article for the New York Times that conscientious objectors suffered from "an inadequacy of neurotic constitutions". Paton was also antagonistic to Communism, arguing in his book Education in War and Peace that Communism was a "mania" rather than a political philosophy. He was a trustee of the Carnegie Institution from 1916 until his death. He died of heart disease in 1942.

== Works ==
- Psychiatry. Philadelphia: J. B. Lippincott Company, 1905.
- Miscellaneous Publications, 1902-1919.
- Education in War and Peace. New York: Paul B. Hoeber, 1920.
- Human Behavior in Relation to the Study of Educational, Social, and Ethical Problems. New York: Charles Scribner's Sons, 1921.
- Signes of Sanity. New York: Charles Scribner's Sons, 1922.
- Prohibiting Minds and the Present Social and Economic Crisis, Paul B. Hoeber, Inc., 1932.

=== Articles ===
- "University Reforms," Popular Science Monthly, Vol. LXXVIII, 1911, pp. 52–70.
- "The World's Most Important Conservation Problem," Popular Science Monthly, Vol. LXXXI, 1912, pp. 163–169.
- "College or University?," Popular Science Monthly, Vol. LXXXII, 1913, pp. 192–201.
- "The Essentials of an Education," Mental Hygiene, Vol. IV, 1920, pp. 265–280.
- “The Psychology of the Radical,” The Yale Review, Vol. XI, 1922, pp. 89–101.
- "Protecting Civilization," The Harpers Monthly, Vol. CXLVIII, No. 884, January 1924, pp. 165–173.
- "Education for Sanity," The Forum, Vol. LXXIX, No. 6, June 1928, pp. 868–876.
- "Co-operation or Revolution," The Forum, Vol. XCII, No. 3, September 1934, pp. 185–188.

=== Other ===
- "What Psychiatry Teaches Concerning Educational Methods," Proceedings of the Mental Hygiene Conference and Exhibit, 1912.
- "Human Behavior in War and Peace," The Harvey Lectures, J. B. Lippincott Company, 1920.

== See also ==
- Adolf Meyer
- Eugenics in the United States
- Thomas P. Bailey
