= Harold Seidman =

American political scientist

- Born: July 2, 1911; Brooklyn, New York, US
- Died: August 20, 2002 (aged 91); Washington, D.C.
- Occupations: Civil servant, professor

Academic background
- Education: Brown University (AB, MA); Yale University (PhD)

Academic work
- Discipline: Political science
- Sub-discipline: Public administration
- Institutions: US Bureau of the Budget; University of Connecticut; Johns Hopkins University
- Notable works: Politics, Position and Power: The Dynamics of Federal Organization

Harold Seidman (July 2, 1911 – August 20, 2002) was an American political scientist who is best known for a classic work in government studies and public administration: Politics, Position and Power: The Dynamics of Federal Organization, now in its fifth edition. He was a well-known expert in US federal bureaucracy and the organization of quasi-public corporations.

== Biography ==
Seidman was born in Brooklyn, New York, and attended Poly Prep Country Day School. He graduated from Brown University with both his Bachelor of Arts (1934) and Master of Arts (1935) degrees in political science. While at Brown he worked summers on the editorial staff of The Nation. In 1943, he received a PhD in government from Yale University.

From 1938 to 1943, Seidman worked as director of research for the New York City Department of Investigation under Thomas E. Dewey and William Bernard Herlands. He organized a college student internship program and conducted investigations.

From 1943 to 1968, Seidman worked for the U.S. Bureau of the Budget. He started out as a management analyst and rose to become chief of the Government Organization Branch in 1961 and Assistant Director of Management and Organization in 1964. He was involved in the creation of the Marshall Plan and Alaska's and Hawaii's bids for statehood. In retirement, he consulted for the government, serving on President Richard Nixon's Ash Council on Executive Office Reorganization.

After retiring from the civil service, Seidman worked as a professor of political science at the University of Connecticut from 1971 to 1984. He was also a research fellow, visiting lecturer, and visiting professor at the University of Leeds (1971–1975). After retiring from UConn, he spent three years as a guest scholar at the Brookings Institution. He was subsequently a senior fellow at Johns Hopkins University Center for the Study of American Government from 1987 until his death in 2002.

Seidman wrote numerous articles and two books influential in the field of public administration. He wrote Labor Czars: A History of Labor Racketeering (1938) and Politics, Position, and Power: The Dynamics of Federal Organization (1970).

Seidman received the American Society for Public Administration's Keeper of the Flame Award in 2001. He was a member of the Cosmos Club. He never married and had no children.
