= Joseph E. Pesce =

Italian-American astrophysicist

Joseph E. Pesce FRAS
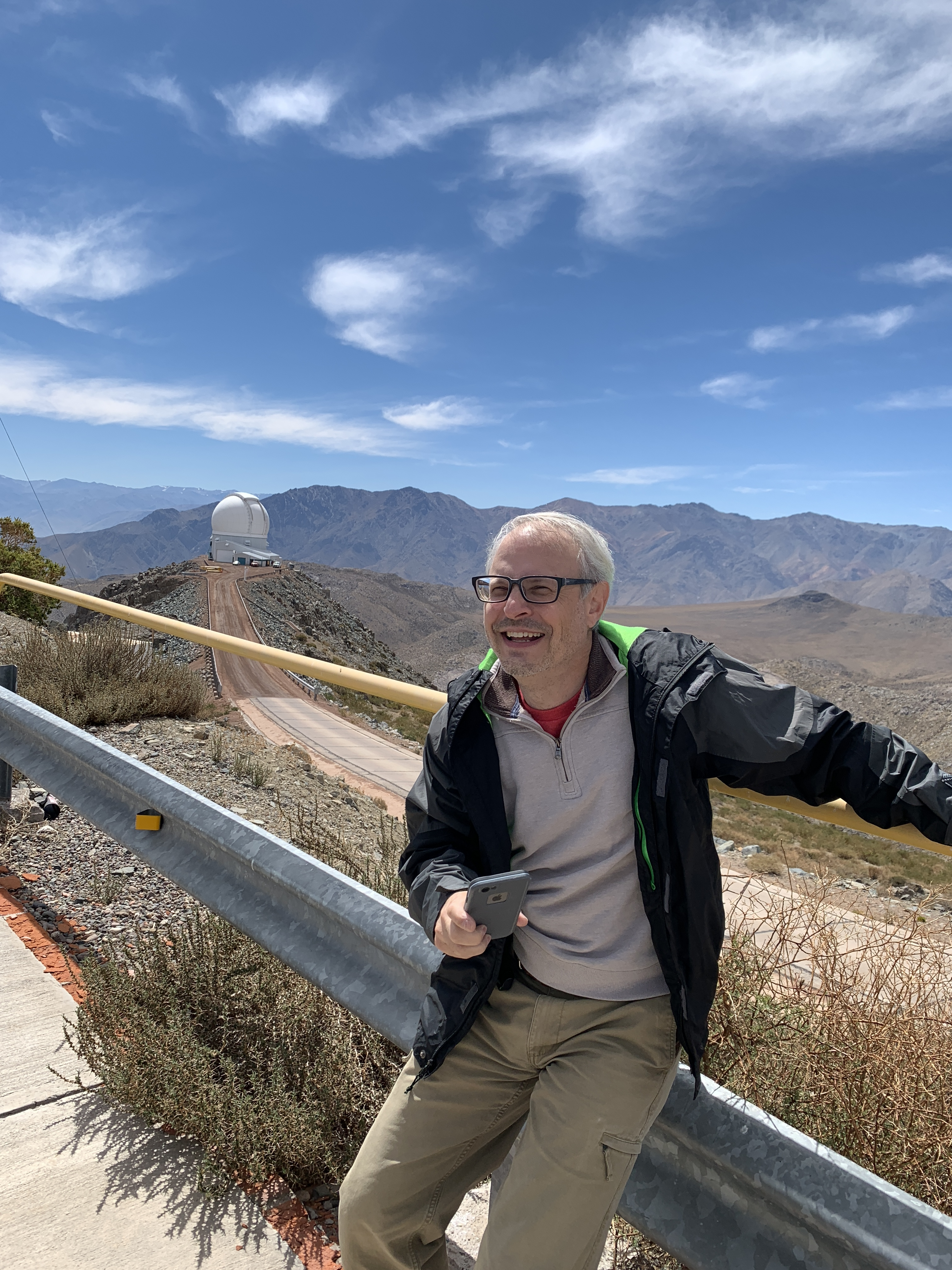
- Pesce at Cerro Pachón, Chile
- Education: University of Colorado, Boulder, Peterhouse, Cambridge, International School for Advanced Studies
- Awards: Honorary Fellow, Peterhouse, Cambridge (2025); Fellow, American Association for the Advancement of Science (2025); Fellow, American Physical Society (2024); NSF Director's Award for Superior Accomplishment
- Scientific career
- Fields: Astrophysics
- Workplaces: National Radio Astronomy Observatory; National Science Foundation; Peterhouse, Cambridge University; George Mason University; University of Colorado, Boulder

Joseph E. Pesce FRAS is an American astrophysicist whose research has focused on active galactic nuclei (AGN), supermassive black holes, their host galaxies and environments, relativistic jets, and galaxy clusters. He is an Assistant Director at the National Radio Astronomy Observatory (NRAO), North American Director of the Atacama Large Millimeter/submillimeter Array (ALMA), and Director of the North American ALMA Science Center.

Pesce previously served as a Program Director in the Division of Astronomical Sciences at the National Science Foundation (NSF). He is also a part-time professor of astrophysics at George Mason University and a visiting professor at the University of Colorado Boulder.

Pesce was elected a Fellow of the American Physical Society in 2024, an Honorary Fellow of Peterhouse, Cambridge in 2025, and a 2025 Fellow of the American Association for the Advancement of Science. He is also a Fellow of the Royal Astronomical Society.

== Early life and education ==
Pesce received a B.A. in physics, cum laude and with honors, from the University of Colorado Boulder. His early research included studies of evolved stars and stellar atmospheres.

He subsequently studied astrophysics at the University of Cambridge, where he was a member of Peterhouse, and at the International School for Advanced Studies (SISSA) in Trieste, Italy. He received M.Phil., M.Sc., and Ph.D. degrees in astrophysics.

His doctoral dissertation, completed in 1993, was titled The Environments of BL Lacertae Objects. His doctoral research examined the galaxies and larger-scale environments associated with BL Lacertae objects, a class of active galactic nuclei in which a relativistic jet is directed approximately toward the observer.

== Research career ==
Pesce's early research included studies of symbiotic binary systems, evolved stars, and the atmospheres of late-type asymptotic giant branch stars. His research subsequently shifted toward extragalactic astrophysics, particularly active galactic nuclei, their host galaxies and environments, galaxy clusters, and supermassive black holes.

Pesce held a postdoctoral fellowship at the Space Telescope Science Institute in Baltimore, where he continued his research on active galaxies using observations from the Hubble Space Telescope and participated in multiwavelength studies of active galactic nuclei and blazars. He later held a research associate professorship at Pennsylvania State University, where his research included high-energy astrophysics and observations of active galaxies.

His research has used observations across the electromagnetic spectrum and has included studies of supermassive black holes, active galactic nuclei, relativistic jets, AGN host galaxies and environments, and galaxy clusters. His work has involved observations from both ground- and space-based telescopes and multiwavelength studies combining observations at different wavelengths.

Pesce was a co-author of a large Hubble Space Telescope imaging survey of BL Lacertae objects. The survey observed 132 BL Lac objects and found that the resolved host galaxies were predominantly luminous elliptical galaxies. The results were consistent with elliptical galaxies being the hosts of BL Lac objects and supported the unification of BL Lac objects with FR I radio galaxies.

Related HST work examined the surface-brightness profiles, luminosities, and morphology of BL Lac host galaxies. Of the host galaxies for which one morphological model was preferred, the preferred model was elliptical.

== National Science Foundation ==
Pesce joined the National Science Foundation's Division of Astronomical Sciences as a Program Director in 2016. His responsibilities included scientific and programmatic oversight of U.S. ground-based radio astronomy facilities.

During his time at NSF, Pesce also participated in international astronomy governance and represented the agency in astronomy-community and public-engagement activities.

== National Radio Astronomy Observatory and ALMA ==
Pesce joined the National Radio Astronomy Observatory as an Assistant Director and became North American Director of the Atacama Large Millimeter/submillimeter Array and Director of the North American ALMA Science Center.

ALMA is an international astronomical observatory operating at millimeter and submillimeter wavelengths from the Chajnantor Plateau in northern Chile. North American participation in ALMA is managed through NRAO, with the North American ALMA Science Center providing scientific and technical support to the North American astronomical community.

As North American ALMA Director, Pesce leads North American ALMA activities and participates in the management and governance of the international observatory. His scientific interests at NRAO include supermassive black holes, active galactic nuclei, AGN host galaxies and environments, relativistic jets, and galaxy clusters.

== Teaching and academic activities ==
Pesce is a part-time professor in the Department of Physics and Astronomy at George Mason University, where he teaches astronomy and astrophysics.

He is also a visiting professor at the University of Colorado Boulder. His teaching there has included science policy through the university's CU in D.C. program, which combines academic study with professional experiences in Washington, D.C.

Pesce is an alumnus of the University of Colorado's Presidents Leadership Class and has subsequently served on its board.

== Consulting ==
Pesce has worked in science and technology consulting in addition to his academic and government careers. He founded and served as president and chief executive officer of Omnis, Inc., a consulting and training company. In 2013, the American Astronomical Society featured Pesce in its career-profile series on astronomers working outside traditional academic careers, describing his transition from astronomical research to consulting.

Pesce has also worked as a science consultant for science-fiction projects, advising television productions and authors on astronomy and astrophysics.

== Science communication and public engagement ==
Pesce has participated in public science communication through television, radio, podcasts, public lectures, online events, and interviews. His public commentary has addressed topics including black holes, active galaxies, observational astronomy, space science, and astronomical discoveries.

He has appeared as an astrophysics commentator in national and international news and science media and has participated in public science programming produced by the National Science Foundation. He has also served as an astronomy expert for Space.com.

Pesce has discussed the relationship between astronomy and science fiction. In a 2022 episode of the American Association for the Advancement of Science's Sci on the Fly podcast, he discussed black holes in science and fiction, including the depiction of black holes and space science in popular culture.

== Awards and honors ==
Pesce was elected a Fellow of the American Physical Society in 2024. His fellowship citation recognized his contributions to the understanding of supermassive black holes and active galactic nuclei, together with scientific outreach, education, leadership, and service to astrophysics.

He was elected an Honorary Fellow of Peterhouse, Cambridge in 2025.

Pesce is a 2025 Fellow of the American Association for the Advancement of Science.

He is also a Fellow of the Royal Astronomical Society and a Fellow of the Cambridge Philosophical Society.

Pesce received the National Science Foundation Director's Award for Superior Accomplishment and has received additional NSF awards for his work at the agency. At George Mason University, a course he taught was recognized as an Outstanding Mason Core course.
