= Jerome H. Kidder =

Jerome Henry Kidder (October 26, 1842 in Baltimore, Maryland - April 8, 1889 in Woods Hole, Massachusetts) was a surgeon and astronomer.

== Early education ==
Kidder graduated Phi Beta Kappa from Harvard University in 1862 with a B.A. and a M.A. in 1875. Between his degrees, Kidder enlisted in the 10th Maryland Volunteer Infantry and later also as a medical cadet in the Union army.

== Career ==
Kidder received his M.D. degree from the University of Maryland in 1866 and eventually rose to the rank of surgeon in 1876, during which time he had served in Japan and elsewhere. In 1869 the king of Portugal conferred upon him the Royal Order of Christ, the decoration authorized by joint resolution of the United States Congress in 1870. In 1874 he was on the USS Swatara as surgeon and naturalist on the expedition to the Kerguelen Islands for the observation of the transit of Venus. He did research for the Smithsonian and Naval Laboratory of Washington, D.C. throughout his life, and served on the United States Fish Commission. He left a bequest of $5000 to help establish the Smithsonian Astrophysical Observatory.
