= Edward Morehouse Douglas =

American topographer with USGS

Edward Morehouse Douglas (October 6, 1855 – July 1, 1932) was one of the first topographers employed by the U.S. Geological Survey. When Douglas began work in 1882, the goal of the new government agency was to produce an integrated topographic map of the United States to support development of natural resources including land, water, and forests. This was the plan of its director, appointed the previous year, John Wesley Powell (1834-1902). Douglas remained at the USGS for the next forty-eight years. A civil engineer who earned a degree at Columbia School of Mines in 1881, he eventually supervised all crews in the Rocky Mountain region extending from Montana to Arizona. In 1911 he became director of the Topographic Branch’s Computing Division. In 1923 he authored the standard work on boundary surveys that remained in use through the 1960s.

== Early life ==
Born in Saratoga Springs, New York, Douglas was the only surviving child of Daniel Spencer Douglas (1827-1902) and Almira Morehouse (1830-1909). His ancestors fought in the American Revolution. After the war, his great-grandparents moved from Connecticut to Saratoga County. Although his parents resettled in Michigan in the late 1850s to farm and operate a shingle mill, the family returned after the Civil War to Mechanicville, New York, where his father sold insurance. Both his grandfather Edward Aaron Morehouse (1803-1887) and his father were lay leaders in the Methodist church. Edward Douglas graduated from Mechanicville Academy in 1872 and went to work as a telegraph operator for the Rensselaer and Saratoga Railroad.

In 1874 Douglas became a machinist at W. and L. E. Gurley precision instrument makers in Troy. William Gurley (1821-1887) and his brother Lewis Ephraim Gurley (1826-1897) founded the company bearing their name. The firm designed and manufactured surveying and engineering tools and marketed them internationally until 1967. In 1983 the Gurley Building on Fulton St., built in 1862, was designated a National Historic Landmark. The brothers were college-trained civil engineers educated at the first American civilian institutions to grant engineering degrees: Rensselaer Polytechnic Institute (William) and Union College (Lewis Ephraim). The inventor Eliphalet Nott (1773-1866) was president of the respective colleges during the brothers’ years of study.

== Columbia School of Mines ==
Douglas followed in the Gurleys’ footsteps when he entered the civil engineering program at Columbia School of Mines in 1877. He chose the more general course of study recently added to Columbia’s earlier degrees in mining engineering or applied metallurgy or chemistry. He was one of eight civil engineers in his graduating class in 1881. Course work included mathematics, physical and biological sciences, modern languages, and specialized subjects such as railroad engineering. The total cost (including room and board) was $600, which Douglas borrowed from his father and repaid in full by 1885.

The Columbia program was a professional stepping stone due to the stature of its professors. By the time of Douglas’s study, the geologist John Strong Newberry (1822-1892) had become a strenuous public advocate of science-driven and government-coordinated western exploration. The campaign led to the establishment of the U.S. Geological Survey by Congress in 1879. The West Point-trained engineer William P. Trowbridge (1828-1892) was another Columbia professor with similar credentials. These men were well acquainted with the first two USGS directors, Clarence King (1842-1901) and Powell, as well as Douglas’s immediate boss, Henry Gannett (1846-1914), named the first USGS chief topographer the same summer Douglas was hired. Douglas and his classmate Herbert M. Wilson (1860-1920) started working at the USGS together, each one heading a topographic party based at Fort Wingate, New Mexico. Their Columbia background positioned them for the task.

== USGS ==
Because the USGS began as a small operation, Douglas filled diverse roles. He supervised field crews, contributed to maps, and redesigned topographic instruments. After a few seasons in charge of topographic parties in the desert Southwest, he traveled among crews scattered across the Intermountain West and ranging into Texas, South Dakota, and Yukon Territory. During winter seasons in Washington, he oversaw the transformation of topographic data into quadrangle maps. At a time when maps were still hand-drawn, Gannett emphasized that the skills of topographers must include “the mathematical and the artistic.” Maps were also collaborative, and although Douglas was rarely identified as sole author, he was a contributor to many, including the Cripple Creek Special Map, Teller County, Colorado (1894, revised 1902-1903) and the Black Hills Forest Reserve Map (ca. 1897). Until 1896 he was responsible for the purchase, repair, and improvement of instruments. Along with Powell’s brother-in-law Almon Harris Thompson (1839-1906), Douglas helped redesign the alidade then in use by adding a telescope and the plane table by improving its stability. He drew on his connection with the Gurley factory when he secured the assistance of Gurley craftsmen in these projects.

Douglas outlived most of the early topographers and adapted to the evolving goals of the USGS. The original objective of a comprehensive topographic map of the United States was never fulfilled, in part because maps drawn for special purposes proved more useful. As assignments and leadership changed, Douglas undertook one project outside the continental United States. In 1908 he led a topographic party to map the Luquillo rainforest in Puerto Rico, a U.S. territory since 1898. In the 1920s, he wrote Boundaries, Areas, Geographic Centers, and Altitudes of the United States and the Several States (1923, 1930, 1966). Arguing that accurate boundary lines deter civil conflict between states and nations, he outlined best practices for conducting surveys and marking locations. When the Topographic Branch replaced its previous in-house guidelines with Topographic Instructions of the USGS (1928), Douglas contributed three long chapters summarizing the time-honored methods of triangulation, transit traverse, and leveling. At the same time, he was interested in innovation. After his retirement from the government in 1930, Douglas worked for the Aerotopograph Corporation of America, a spin-off business begun by one-time USGS director Claude H. Birdseye (1878-1941). The company contracted for topographic mapping done by aircraft.

== Honors and public service ==
In 1887 Douglas was invited to join the Cosmos Club, founded a decade earlier in the Washington home of John Wesley Powell to honor scientific achievement. He was elected to the American Society of Civil Engineers in 1904. When the Twenty-Year Club of the Topographic Branch began during the winter of 1910-1911, Douglas entered as the thirteenth member in order of date of initial employment.

A pioneering resident in 1893 of Takoma Park, one of the original planned suburbs launched by the Washington real estate developer Benjamin Franklin Gilbert (1841-1907), Douglas served on the Takoma Town Council (1902-1906) and chaired its Water and Sewer Commission. He was a member of the Vestry of Takoma Park Episcopal Church.

== Family ==
Douglas married Zilpha Minnie Childs (1858-1959) in North Adams, Mass., Aug. 3, 1881. Childs was the only child of Warner A. Childs (1823-1903) and Hannah Taft (1819-1911). The Childses were neighbors of Chester A. Arthur (1829-1886) in Manhattan and hosted a dinner in Arthur’s honor when he became president in 1881. Zilpha Minnie was one of the original automobile owners in Washington, pictured on the running board of her electric car in a photo published in the Washington Evening Star on her 100th birthday in 1958. The Douglases had two children, Willard (1885-1960) and Helen (1887-1989).
