= Arthur Louis Day =

American geophysicist and volcanologist

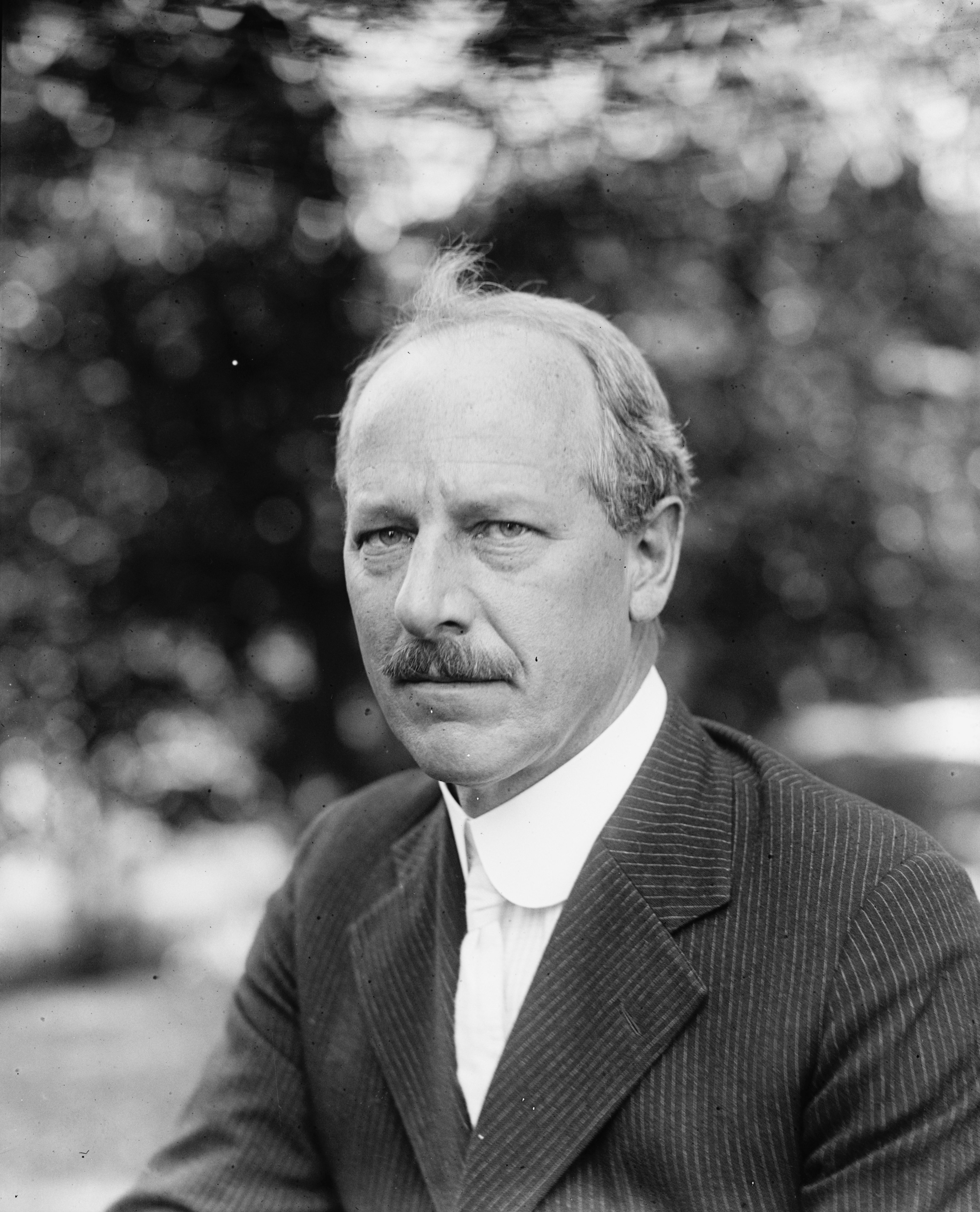
- Born: October 30, 1869; Brookfield, Massachusetts, U.S.
- Died: March 2, 1960 (aged 90); Washington, D.C., U.S.
- Education: Sheffield Scientific School at Yale University; University of Groningen
- Awards: John Scott Medal; Bakhuis Roozeboom Medal; William Bowie Medal (1940); Wollaston Medal (1941); Penrose Medal (1947)
- Scientific career
- Fields: Thermometry; Seismology; Geothermal energy
- Workplaces: Yale University; Physikalisch-Technische Bundesanstalt; U.S. Geological Survey

Arthur Louis Day (October 30, 1869 – March 2, 1960) was an American geophysicist and volcanologist. He studied high temperature thermometry, seismology and geothermal energy.

== Early life ==
Day was born in Brookfield, Massachusetts and received his A.B. from Sheffield Scientific School at Yale University in 1892. He earn his Ph.D from Sheffield in 1894, and taught at Yale until 1897. Day received an honorary doctorate from the University of Groningen (The Netherlands) on July 1, 1914.

== Career ==
In 1894 and 1895 he worked with German physicist Friedrich Kohlrausch studying the conductive properties of electrolytes. From 1897 to 1900 he worked at Physikalisch-Technische Bundesanstalt in Berlin and began his study of thermometry.

He worked with the U.S. Geological Survey from 1900 to 1907 studying the properties of rocks and minerals at very high and low temperatures. Day served as the director of the Geophysical Laboratory of the Carnegie Institution for Science from 1907 until his retirement in 1936. From 1933 to 1941 he served as vice president of the National Academy of Sciences. He was president of The Geological Society of America in 1938.

Following his retirement, he traveled to New Zealand to continue his study of seismology and geothermal energy. He studied the area's volcanic areas until he had to stop his research in 1946 due to poor health.

He died on March 2, 1960, in Washington, D.C.

== Awards and legacy ==
Day was awarded the John Scott Medal, the Wollaston Medal, the Penrose Medal, the Bakhuis Roozeboom Medal and the William Bowie Medal.

Day was elected to both the American Philosophical Society and the American Academy of Arts and Sciences in 1912.

In 1948, Day established the Arthur L. Day Medal through the Geological Society of America. The medal is for "outstanding distinction in contributing to geologic knowledge through the application of physics and chemistry to the solution of geologic problems".

== Family life ==
Day was the son of Daniel P. and Fanie (Hobbs) Day. In 1900, he married Helen Kohlrausch, daughter of physicist Friedrich Kohlrausch. Day and his wife had four children: Margaret, Dorothy, Helen and Ralph. In 1933, he married Ruth Sarah Easling. They had no children together.
