= Addams Stratton McAllister =

American electrical engineer (1875–1946)

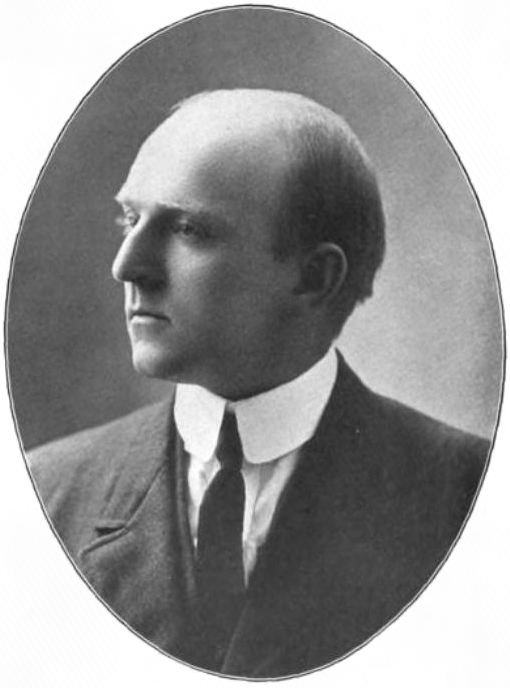
- Born: February 24, 1875; Covington, Virginia
- Died: November 26, 1946 (aged 71); Clifton Forge, Virginia
- Burial place: Cedar Hill Cemetery, Covington, Virginia
- Education: B.Sc, Class of 1898, Pennsylvania State College Degree in Electrical Engineering, Class of 1900, Pennsylvania State College; Master in Mechanical Engineering, Class of 1901, Cornell University Ph.D., Class of 1905, Cornell University
- Alma mater: Pennsylvania State College; Cornell University
- Occupation: Engineer

Addams Stratton McAllister (February 24, 1875 – November 26, 1946) was an American electrical engineer and editor.

== Career ==
He was educated at Pennsylvania State College (B.S. 1898; E.E., 1900) and at Cornell University (M.M.E., 1901; Ph.D., 1905).

He was employed by the Berwind-White Coal Mining Company in 1898 and by the Westinghouse Electric and Manufacturing Company in 1899. He was associate editor (1905–12) and thereafter editor of the Electrical World. He contributed many articles on engineering subjects to technical publications. In 1915, he was president of the Illuminating Engineering Society.

In 1921 he joined the Bureau of Standards as a liaison officer, progressing in 1926 to head the Division of Specifications and to Assistant Director in 1929. The bureau's Standards Yearbooks from 1927 to 1933 were published under his direction. He retired in February 1945.

He was inducted as a Fellow of the American Physical Society in 1929.

== Bibliography ==
=== Books ===
- Alternating Current Motors (1906; third edition, 1909) McGraw-Hill Book Co; Enlarged. ISBN 9780469131361
- Standard Handbook for Electrical Engineers (1907)
- The Descendants of John Thomson, Pioneer Scotch Covenanter (2018) Forgotten Books ISBN 9780342732395
