= Ellery Cory Stowell =

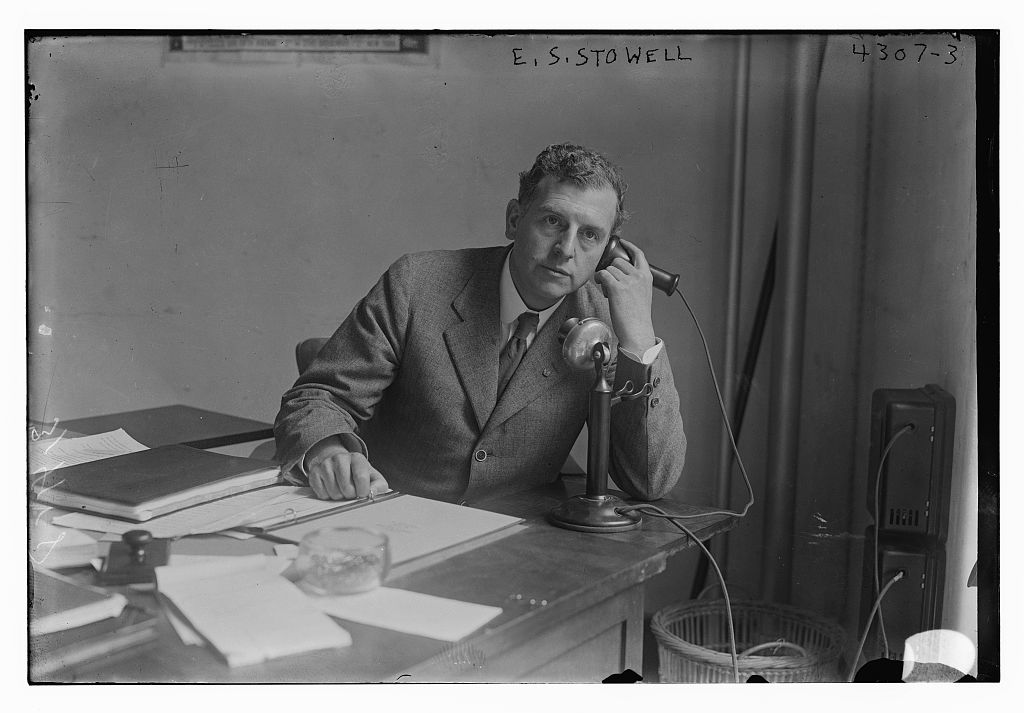
- Stowell in 1917
- Born: December 12, 1875; Lynn, Massachusetts
- Died: January 1, 1958 (aged 82); Berkeley, California
- Education: Harvard College (BA)

Ellery Cory Stowell (December 12, 1875 - January 1, 1958) was a professor of international law at Columbia University and then American University in Washington, D.C. He represented the United States at The Hague Convention of 1907 and the London Naval Conference (1908–1909).

== Biography ==
Stowell was born on December 12, 1875, in Lynn, Massachusetts. He was a professor of international law at Columbia University and then American University in Washington, D.C. He moved to California when he retired. He died on January 1, 1958, in Berkeley, California.

== Legacy ==
Stowell's papers are stored at Stanford University.
