= James H. Billington =

American author (1929–2018)

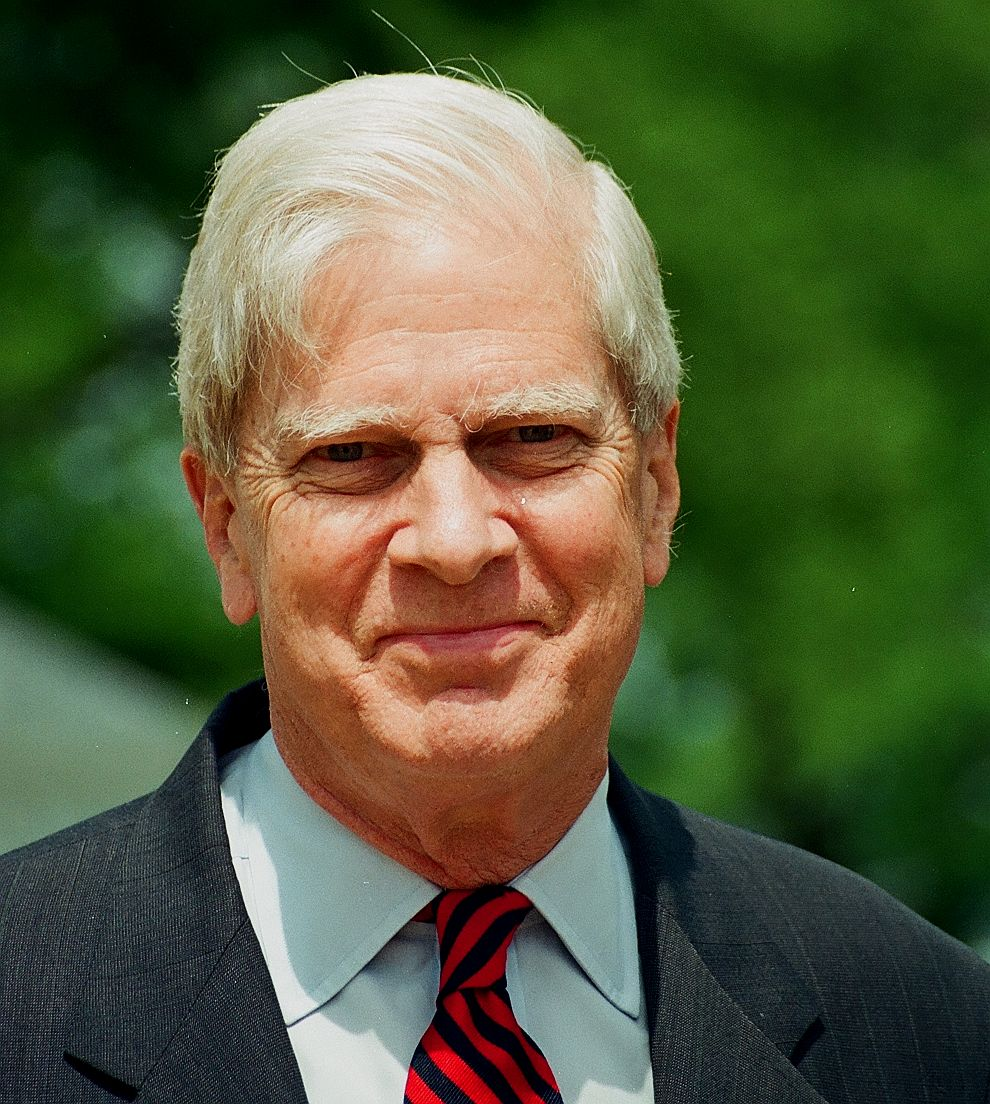

13th Librarian of Congress
- In office September 14, 1987 – September 30, 2015
- President: Ronald Reagan; George H. W. Bush; Bill Clinton; George W. Bush; Barack Obama
- Preceded by: Daniel J. Boorstin
- Succeeded by: David S. Mao (acting)

Personal details
- Born: James Hadley Billington; June 1, 1929 Bryn Mawr, Pennsylvania, U.S.
- Died: November 20, 2018 (aged 89) Washington, D.C., U.S.
- Education: Princeton University (BA); Balliol College, Oxford (DPhil)
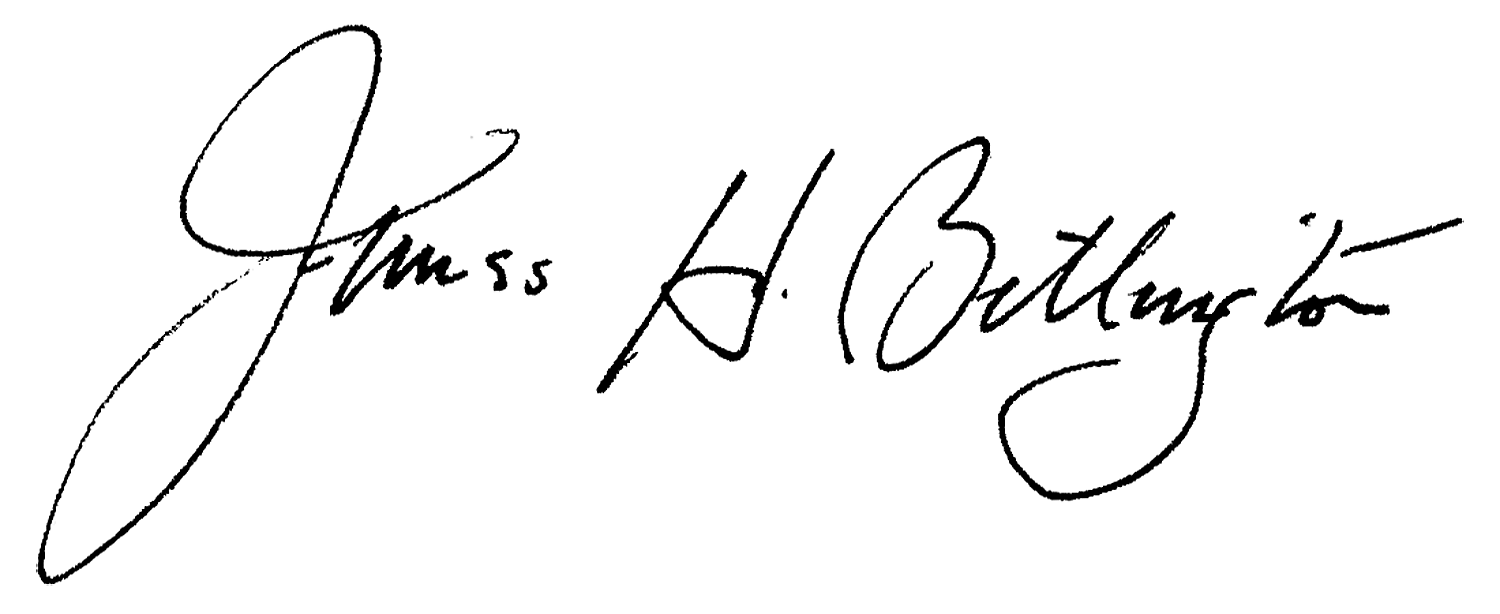
- Signature

James Hadley Billington (June 1, 1929 – November 20, 2018) was an American academic and author who taught history at Harvard and Princeton before serving for 42 years as CEO of four federal cultural institutions. He served as the 13th Librarian of Congress after being nominated by President Ronald Reagan in 1987, and his appointment was approved unanimously by the U.S. Senate. He retired as Librarian on September 30, 2015.

== Life ==
Born in Bryn Mawr, Pennsylvania, Billington was educated in Philadelphia-area public schools. He was class valedictorian at both Lower Merion High School and Princeton University, where he graduated with highest honors and an A.B. in history in 1950 after completing a senior thesis titled "Nicholas Berdyaev." Three years later, he earned his doctorate in Russian history from Balliol College of the University of Oxford, where he was a Rhodes Scholar and student of the philosopher Isaiah Berlin.

Following service with the U.S. Army and the Office of National Estimates, he taught history at Harvard University from 1957 to 1962 and subsequently at Princeton University, where he was a professor of history from 1964 to 1974.

From 1973 to 1987, Billington was director of the Woodrow Wilson International Center for Scholars, the nation's official memorial in Washington, D.C., to America's 28th president. As director, he founded the Kennan Institute for Advanced Russian Studies at the center, and seven other new programs, as well as the Wilson Quarterly.

Billington was married to the former Marjorie Anne Brennan. They had four children: Susan Billington Harper, Anne Billington Fischer, the Rev. James Hadley Billington Jr., and Thomas Keator Billington, as well as 12 grandchildren. Billington and his daughter Susan were the first father and daughter to both be awarded Rhodes Scholarships and to use them to earn Doctorates of Philosophy at Oxford University.

== Library of Congress ==
External audio
- National Press Club Luncheon Speakers, James H. Billington, January 12, 1989, speech at 6:34-30:01, National Press Club

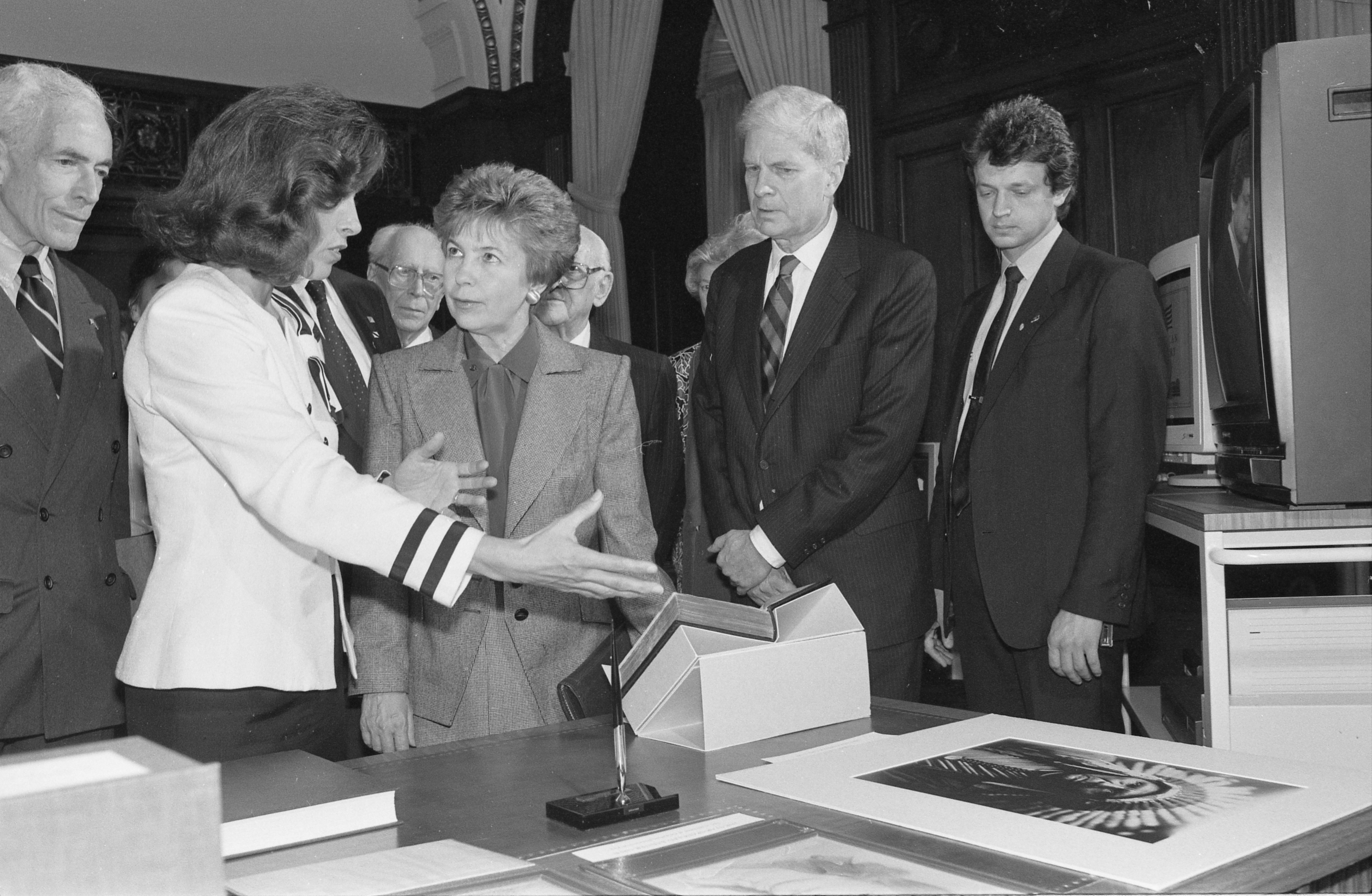
Billington watches as Raisa Gorbacheva listens to Marilyn Quayle at a display of books and other items at the Library of Congress in 1990.

Billington was sworn in as the Librarian of Congress on September 14, 1987. He was the 13th person to hold the position since the Library of Congress was established in 1800. He was nominated by President Ronald Reagan and his appointment was unanimously confirmed by the Senate.

During his tenure at the Library of Congress, Billington doubled the size of the Library's traditional analog collections, from 85.5 million items in 1987 to more than 160 million items in 2014. He led the acquisition of Lafayette's previously inaccessible papers in 1996 from Château de la Grange-Bléneau in France. Billington has since been the only non-Frenchman on the board of the foundation governing the castle. He also acquired the only copy of the 1507 Waldseemüller world map ("America's birth certificate") in 2003 for permanent display in the Library's Thomas Jefferson Building.

Billington pioneered the reconstruction, using privately raised funds, of Thomas Jefferson's original library, which was placed on permanent display in the Jefferson building in 2008. He enlarged and technologically enhanced public spaces of the Jefferson Building into a national exhibition venue, and hosted over 100 exhibitions, most featuring materials not previously displayed publicly in the United States. These included exhibits on the Vatican Library and the Bibliothèque Nationale de France, several on the Civil War and Lincoln, on African-American culture, on Religion and the founding of the American Republic, the Early Americas (the Kislak Collection is now on permanent display), and the global celebration commemorating the 800th anniversary of Magna Carta, and on early American printing featuring the Rubenstein Bay Psalm Book. Billington also advocated successfully for an underground connection between the U.S. Capitol Visitors Center and the Library in 2008 to increase congressional usage and public tours of the Library's Thomas Jefferson Building.

Billington launched a mass deacidification program in 2001, which has extended the lifespan of almost 4 million volumes and 12 million manuscript sheets; and a new collection storage modules at Fort Meade, the first opening in 2002, to preserve and make accessible more than 4 million items from the Library's analog collections. Billington established the Library Collections Security Oversight Committee in 1992 to improve protection of collections, and also the Library of Congress Congressional Caucus in 2008 to draw attention to the Library's curators and collections. He created the Library's first Young Readers Center in the Jefferson Building in 2009, and the first large-scale summer intern (Junior Fellows) program for university students in 1991. Under Billington, the Library also sponsored the Gateway to Knowledge in 2010–2011, a mobile exhibition to 90 sites covering all states east of the Mississippi in a specially designed 18-wheel truck, increasing public access to library collections off-site, particularly for rural populations.

During his tenure at the Library of Congress, Billington championed no-fee electronic services, beginning with:

- American Memory in 1990, which became The National Digital Library in 1994, providing free access online to digitized American history and culture resources with curatorial explanations for K-12 education;
- thomas.gov website in 1994 to provide free public access to U.S. federal legislative information with ongoing updates; and congress.gov website to provide a state-of-the-art framework for both Congress and the public in 2012;
- Educational portal for K-12 teachers and students in 1996, and subsequently new prizes and programs for advancing literacy in 2013;
- Online social media presence for the Library beginning in 2007, which expanded to include blogs, Flickr, establishment of Flickr Commons, Facebook, iTunesU, Pinterest, RSS, Twitter, YouTube and other new media channels. Twitter donated its digital archive to the Library of Congress in 2010; its vice president of engineering, Greg Pass noted, "I am very grateful that Dr. Billington and the Library recognize the value of this information."
- "eCo" online copyright registration, status-checking, processing, and electronic file upload systems in 2008;
- The World Digital Library in 2009, in association with UNESCO and 181 partners in 81 countries, to make online copies of professionally curated primary materials of the world's varied cultures free available in multiple languages.
- Resource Description and Access (RDA) in 2010, a new cataloguing standard for the digital age implemented in 2013;
- BIBFRAME in 2011, a data model for bibliographic description to provide a foundation for those depending on bibliographic data shared by the Library with partners on the web and in the broader networked world;
- National Jukebox in 2011 to provide streaming free online access to more than 10,000 out-of-print music and spoken word recordings.
- BARD in 2013, digital talking books mobile app for Braille and Audio Reading Downloads in partnership with the Library's National Library Service for the blind and physically handicapped, that enables free downloads of audio and Braille books to mobile devices via the Apple App Store.

Billington directed the growth of the Library of Congress' digital outreach and analog collections during the period 1992 through 2014 when the Library also experienced a 30 percent decrease in its staff largely due to legislative appropriations cutbacks. Every three years, the Librarian reviews the Digital Millennium Copyright Act (DMCA). In 2010, Billington's decision to open new DMCA loopholes resulted in his being described as "the most important person you never heard of, having headed the library since well before the Web was spun or the DMCA was even a glint in the Recording Industry Association of America's eye ... It was probably Billington's unassailable reputation for integrity and probity that won the LOC this power under the DMCA."

Billington championed the Library's American Memory National Digital Library (NDL) Program, which makes freely available on-line over 24 million American historical items from the collections of the Library and other research institutions. Besides these unique American Memory materials, the Library Internet services include the congressional database, THOMAS; the on-line card catalog; exhibitions; information from the U.S. Copyright Office; and a web site for children and families called America's Library. In fiscal year 2013 the Library's website recorded 84 million visits and 519 million page views.

Billington also established the following new programs at the Library of Congress:

- The National Book Festival, founded in 2001 with Laura Bush, which has brought more than 10000 authors and more than a million guests to the National Mall and the Washington Convention Center. Thanks to a major gift from David Rubenstein in 2013, Billington also promoted the establishment of Library of Congress Literacy Awards to recognize and support achievements in improving literacy in the United States and abroad;
- The Kluge Center, started in 2000 with a grant of $60 million John W. Kluge, the Kluge Center increases engagement of scholars with the U.S. Congress and other public leaders brought to the Library through endowed Kluge fellowships;
- The Kluge Prize for the Study of Humanity (now worth $1.5 million), the first Nobel-level international prize for lifetime achievement in the humanities and social sciences (subjects not included in the Nobel awards);
- The National Audio-Visual Conservation Center, which opened in 2007 at a 45-acre site in Culpeper, Virginia, thanks to the largest private gift ever made to the Library (more than $150 million by the Packard Humanities Institute) and $82.1 million additional support from Congress. In 1988, Billington also established the National Film Preservation Board, a congressionally mandated National Film Preservation Board to select American films annually for preservation and inclusion in the new National Registry. The Librarian named 650 films to the Registry by 2015;
- The Veterans History Project, congressionally mandated in 2000 to collect, preserve, and make accessible the personal accounts of American war veterans from World War I to the present day;
- The National Registry of Recorded Sound, congressionally mandated in 2000, to which Billington has selected 425 recordings to date;
- The Gershwin Prize for Popular Song, started in 2007 to honor the work of an artist whose career reflects lifetime achievement in song composition. Winners have included Paul Simon, Stevie Wonder, Paul McCartney, Burt Bacharach and Hal David, Carole King, Billy Joel, and Willie Nelson. Billington also launched the Living Legend Awards in 2000 to honor artists, activists, filmmakers, and others who have contributed to America's diverse cultural, scientific, and social heritage, (he was himself declared a Library of Congress Living Legend after his tenure);
- Open World Leadership Center started in 2000, which has administered 23,000 professional exchanges for emerging post-Soviet leaders in Russia, Ukraine, and the other successor states of the former USSR to visit counterparts in the United States. Open World began as a Library of Congress project, and later became an independent agency in the legislative branch. Billington is founder and was chairman of the board of trustees.
- The Fiction Prize (now the Library of Congress Prize for American Fiction) created in 2008 to recognize distinguished lifetime achievement in the writing of fiction.

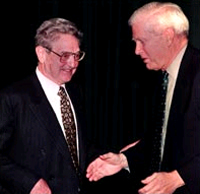
George Soros (left) and James H. Billington at the Library of Congress in Washington, D.C., on January 22, 2001, to discuss the views expressed in Soros' new book, Open Society: Reforming Global Capitalism

During Billington's tenure at the Library of Congress, he raised more than half a billion dollars of private support to supplement Congressional appropriations. These private funds were used to increase Library collections, programs, and digital outreach. Billington created the Library's first development office for private fundraising in 1987, and, in 1990, established the James Madison Council, the Library's first national private sector donor-support group. Billington also asked the GAO to conduct the first Library-wide audit in 1987. This precedent led to regular annual financial audits, which produced unmodified ("clean") opinions from 1995 onwards. He also created the first Office of the Inspector General at the library in 1987 to provide regular independent review of library operations.

At the 2011 National Book Festival, author David McCullough said: "We have had a number of eminent distinguished Librarians of Congress: Archibald MacLeish, the famous poet, Daniel Boorstin, the scholar and historian .... But we have never had a more accomplished, productive, inspirational or far-seeing Librarian of Congress than James Billington."

Billington is the author of Mikhailovsky and Russian Populism (1956), The Icon and the Axe (1966), Fire in the Minds of Men (1980), Russia Transformed: Breakthrough to Hope, August 1991 (1992) and The Face of Russia (1998), a companion book to the three-part television series of the same name, which he wrote and narrated for the Public Broadcasting Service, and Russia in Search of Itself (2004). These books have been translated and published in a variety of languages. Billington also wrote and hosted a nationally televised series for PBS, "The Humanities Film Forum", with Mark Waxman, executive producer, in 1973.

External videos
- Q&A interview with Billington on his 20 years at the Library of Congress, July 1, 2007, C-SPAN

Billington accompanied ten congressional delegations to Russia and the former Soviet Union, making him, in the words of commentator George Weigel, "the personal tutor in Russian affairs to several generations of members of the House and the Senate." In June 1988, Billington accompanied President and Mrs. Reagan to the Soviet Summit in Moscow. In October 2004, he headed a Library of Congress delegation to Tehran that expanded exchanges between the Library of Congress and the National Library of Iran. Billington was the most senior U.S. government official to openly visit Iran in 25 years.

=== Criticism ===
Critics felt that Billington's approach of wooing wealthy private donors was inappropriate, and his management was criticized by a number of inquiries by government oversight agencies and librarians. In addition, in 2015, Congress passed and President Barack Obama signed into law the "Librarian of Congress Succession Modernization Act of 2015", which put a 10-year term limit on the position with an option for reappointment. The legislation was seen as a critique of Billington's unwillingness to hire a permanent chief information officer to effectively manage and update the library's information technology.

== Honors ==
Billington received 42 honoris causa degrees, as well as the Presidential Citizen's Medal (2008), Woodrow Wilson Award from Princeton University (1992), the Golden Plate Award of the American Academy of Achievement (1992), the UCLA Medal (1999), and the Pushkin Medal of the International Association of the Teachers of Russian Language and Culture (1999). He was awarded the Order of Friendship by the president of the Russian Federation (2008), the highest order that a foreign citizen may receive. He received honorary doctorates from Tbilisi State University in Georgia (1999) and the Russian State University for the Humanities (2001), and the University of Oxford (2002).

Billington was elected a Fellow of the American Academy of Arts and Sciences in 1985. He was an elected member of the Russian Academy of Sciences, and has been decorated as Chevalier (1985), Chevalier of the Legion of Honor (2007), and again as a Commander of the Order of Arts and Letters (1991) of France, as Commander of the National Order of the Southern Cross of Brazil (2002), awarded the Order of Merit of the Italian Republic (2002), and a Knight Commander's Cross of the Order of Merit by the Federal Republic of Germany (1995). Billington was awarded the first Lafayette Prize by the French-American Cultural Foundation (2007). He has also been awarded the Gwanghwa Medal by the Republic of Korea (1991), and the Chingiz Aitmatov Gold Medal by the Kyrgyz Republic (2001). Altogether, Billington received decorations and awards from 15 foreign governments and universities.

Billington was a longtime member of the editorial advisory boards of Foreign Affairs and of Theology Today, and a member of the Board of Foreign Scholarships (1971–1976; chairman, 1973–1975), which has executive responsibility for academic exchanges worldwide under the Fulbright-Hays Act. He was on the board of the John F. Kennedy Center for the Performing Arts and was a member of the American Philosophical Society.

== Death ==
Billington died November 20, 2018, at Sibley Memorial Hospital in Washington, D.C., of complications from pneumonia. He was 89.

== Publications ==
External videos
- Booknotes interview with Billington on Russia Transformed (September 13, 1992). C-SPAN.
- Presentation by Billington on The Face of Russia (November 10, 1998). C-SPAN.
- Presentation by Billington on Russia in Search of Itself (April 20, 2004). C-SPAN.

- The Icon and the Axe: An Interpretative History of Russian Culture. New York City: Alfred A. Knopf (1966). ISBN 978-0394708461.
  - Икона и топор : опыт истолкования истории русской културы (Moscow)
- Fire in the Minds of Men: Origins of the Revolutionary Faith. London: Temple Smith (1980). ISBN 978-0851171968. Published with new introduction by the author in 1999: New Brunswick, New Jersey: Transaction Publishers.
  - Full text at Internet Archive.
- Russia Transformed: Breakthrough to Hope, Moscow, August 1991. New York City: The Free Press (1992). ISBN 0029035155, 978-0029035153.
- The Face of Russia: Anguish, Aspiration, and Achievement in Russian Culture. London (1998). ISBN 978-1556356766.
- Russia in Search of Itself. Washington, D.C.: Woodrow Wilson Press & Baltimore: Johns Hopkins University Press (2004). ISBN 0801879760.

== Television productions ==
- Billington, James H. (1973). Humanities Film Forum, PBS Documentary Series.
- Billington, James H. (1988). The face of Russia: A Three part documentary television series. Malone Gill Productions, The Library of Congress, WETA, Washington, D.C., and Public Media Inc. ISBN 0-7800-2043-X, ISBN 0-7800-2044-8, ISBN 0-7800-2045-6.

== Contributing author ==
- "Orthodox Christianity and the Russian Transformation", Proselytism and Orthodoxy in Russia: The New War for Souls, edited by Whitte, John, and Michael Bourdeaux. New York: Orbis Books, 1999/2009. ISBN 9781606086728
  - 俄国的东正教与劝诱改宗 (2013)
- Preface, Revelations from the Russian Archives: Documents in English, edited by Diane Koenker and Ronald D. Bachman. Washington, D.C.: Library of Congress, 1997. ISBN 9780844408910
- Introduction to Before the Revolution: St. Petersburg in Photographs, 1890–1914, text by Mikhail P. Iroshnikov, Yury B. Shelayev and Liudmila A. Protsai. New York: Abrams, 1992.
- "Six Views of the Russian Revolution", Russian and Soviet History, edited by Bertrand M. Patenaude. New York, London: Garland Publishing, 1992.
- Foreword, Before the Revolution: St. Petersburg in Photographs, 1890–1914, by Mikhail P. Iroshnikov, Yury B. Shelayev, Liudmila A. Protsai; introduction by Dmitry S. Likhachov. New York: Harry N. Abrams; Leningrad: Nauka: JV SMART, 1991.
- "The Role of a Western University in Forming a Social Morality", Moral Values and Higher Education, edited by Dennis L. Thompson. (Based on an address given at a symposium held at Brigham Young University, February 1987). Provo, Utah: Brigham Young University Press, 1991.
- Foreword, Henry M. Jackson and World Affairs: Selected Speeches, 1953–1983, edited by Dorothy Fosdick. Seattle: University of Washington Press, 1990.
- Introduction to Solidarity and Poland, Impacts East and West, edited by Steve W. Reiquam; a collections of papers presented at conferences, "The Legacy of Solidarity", Held February 1987 at the Woodrow Wilson International Center for Scholars, Washington, D.C.: Wilson Center Press: 1988.
- "Diplomacy and the Soviet Union", Diplomacy for the Future, edited by George C. McGhee. Washington, D.C.: University Press of America, in cooperation with the Institute for the Study of Diplomacy, Georgetown, university, 1987, pp. 35–48.
- "American Foreign Policy and the New Isolationism", Public Diplomacy: USA Versus USSR, edited by Richard F. Staar. Stanford, California: Hoover Institution Press, Stanford University, 1986, pp. 3–18 (adaptation of address delivered at Hoover Institution, October 3, 1985).
- "Education and Culture: Beyond 'Lifestyles'", Virtue—Public & Private, edited by Richard John Neuhaus. Grand Rapids, Michigan: Wm. B. Eerdmans, in cooperation with the Rockford Institute Center on Religion and Society, 1986, pp. 1–7.
- "Socio-Cultural Imperatives for a New Containment Policy", Containment Concept and Policy, edited by Terry L. Deibel and John Lewis Gaddis. Washington, D.C.: National Defense University Press, 1986, v. 2, pp. 597–613.
- "General Change: In Search of a Post-Stalinist Identity", From Brezhnev to Gorbachev – Domestic Affairs and Soviet Foreign Policy, edited by Hans-Joachim Veen. Leamington Spa, Hamburg, New York: Berg, 1987, pp. 156–163. (English translation of "Der Generationswechsel: Die Suche nach einer nachstalinistischen Identität", Wohin entwickelt sich die Sowjetunion? Zur aussenpolitischen Relevanz innerpolitischer Entwicklungen.)
- "Three Views of Revolution", And He Loved Big Brother: Man, State and Society in Question (contributions to the George Orwell Colloquium, 1984, Council of Europe, Strasbourg), London, 1985, pp. 13–24; also in Reflections on America, 1984, An Orwell Symposium, edited by Robert Mulvihill. University of Georgia Press, 1986, pp. 202–214.
- "Der Generationswechsel: Die Suche nach einer nachstalinistischen Identität", Wohin entwickelt sich die Sowjetunion? Zur aussenpolitischen Relevanz innerpolitischer Entwicklungen, edited by Hans-Joachim Veen. (Third German-American Conference, Social Science Research Institute, Konrad-Adenauer-Stiftung, Sankt Augustin bei Bonn) Melle: Knoth, 1984, pp. 180–183.
- "Rival Revolutionary Ideals", Totalitarian Democracy and After (International Colloquium in Memory of Jacob L. Talmon.) Jerusalem: Israeli Academy of Science and Humanities, 1984, pp. 56–69.
- "Reflections on the Nonmaterial Aspects of National Interests", The National Interests of the United States in Foreign Policy, edited by Prosser Gifford. Washington, D.C.: Woodrow Wilson International Center for Scholars, 1981, pp. 180–183.
- "Neglected Figures and Features in the Rise of the Raskol", The Religious World of Russian Culture, edited by Andrew Blane. The Hague, Paris: Mouton, 1975.
- "The Spirit of Russian Art", introduction to The Arts of Russia. New York: Horizon, 1970.
- "The Intellectuals", Prospects for Soviet Society, edited by Allen Kassof. New York: Praeger, 1968, pp. 449–472.
- "Finland", chapter on Finnish Communism, Communism and Revolution, edited by C. Black and T. Thornton. Princeton: Princeton University Press, 1964, pp. 117–144.

=== Booklets ===
- The Intellectual and Cultural Dimensions of International Relations. Washington, D.C. (presented at the Plenary Meeting XXII of the President's Committee on the Arts and the Humanities, February 28, 1991).
- The Electronic Erosion of Democracy, University of Illinois at Urbana–Champaign (presented as the Inaugural C. Walter and Gerda B. Mortenson Distinguished Lecture, September 10, 1990).
- Books and the World, Center for the Book, Library of Congress, Washington, D.C., 1988 (adaptation of address given at opening of exhibition – "Legacies of Genius" – Philadelphia, Pennsylvania, April 13, 1988).
- The Moral Imperative of Conservation, The National Committee to Save America's Cultural Collections, Washington, D.C. (presented as keynote address of "Invest in the American Collection", a Regional Forum on the Conservation of Cultural Property, June 16, 1987, The Art Institute of Chicago).
- The Adventure of Liberal Education, Syracuse, 1982.
- The Humanities Film Forum, Los Angeles, 1973.

=== Book contributions ===
- Foreword to Freud: Conflict and Culture, by Michael S. Roth. New York: Vintage Books (2000). pp. ix-x. ISBN 978-0679772927. OCLC 44095203.

=== Book reviews ===
- "The Cross and the Sickle." Review of A Long Walk to Church: A Contemporary History of Russian Orthodoxy by Nathaniel Davis. New York Times Book Review (April 16, 1995), p. 25.
- "A Revolutionary Russian Writer's Redemption." Review of Dostoevsky: The Miraculous Years, 1865–1871 by Joseph Frank. Wall Street Journal (March 28, 1995), p. A24.

=== Articles ===
- "Okay, They've Met. Now Let's Get Engaged." Washington Post (June 17, 2001), p. B2.
- "Russia, Between a Dream and a Nightmare" (Op-Ed). New York Times (June 17, 1998).
- "Religion and Russia's Future: The Templeton Lecture on Religion and World Affairs." Foreign Policy Research Institute WIRE, vol. 5, no. 10 (October 1997), pp. 1–4.
- "Russian Librarians Host Idea Exchange in Vologda." American Libraries (September 1996), p. 21.
- "Here Today, Here Tomorrow: The Imperative of Collections Security." American Libraries (August 1996), p. 40.
- "On My Mind: A Technological Flood Requires Human Navigators." American Libraries (June/July 1996), p. 39.
- "Libraries, the Library of Congress, and the Information Age." Daedalus: Books, Bricks, & Bytes (Fall 1996). American Academy of Arts and Sciences.
- "The Library of Congress' National Digital Library Program." In: Digital Libraries: Research and Technology Advances. Berlin, Heidelberg: Springer-Verlag (1996).

Selected Papers from ADL '95 Forum held in McLean, Virginia (May 1995).

- "Let Russia Be Russian" (Op-ed). New York Times (June 16, 1996).
- "Cultural Heritage, Education, and the Information Highway", J. Paul Getty Trust Bulletin, spring 1995 (from speech presented at Center for Education in the Arts' National Conference held in January 1995).
- "Gliazhu vpered ia bez boiazni", Moskovskie novosti, January 15/22, 1995, p. 20.
- "The Local Library and the Electronic Age", Moveable Type, Willamette University publication, Salem, Oregon, 1994/95.
- "Khristianstvo i preobrazovanie Rossii", Mera, St. Petersburg: Glagol, 1994 (Russian translation of "Christianity and the Transformation of Russia", speech given at the 71st Convocation of the U.S. Episcopal Church, August 29, 1994).
- "Electronic Content and Civilization's Discontent", Educom Review, September/October 1994, p. 22.
- "The Case for Orthodoxy", The New Republic, May 30, 1994, p. 24.
- "The Electronic Library", Media Studies Journal, Winter 1994, p. 109.
- "Religious Revival in Russia: Discovery and Change", Woodstock Report, October 1992, no. 31, pp. 3–8. (An abridged version of opening presentation at Woodstock Theological Center's Forum on Religion in the Former Soviet Republics, May 6, 1992).
- "Opening a Window on Deceit", U.S. News & World Report, August 24, 1992.
- "The Intellectual and Cultural Dimensions of International Relations: Present Ironies and Future Possibilities", The Journal of Arts Management, Law and Society, v. 22, no. 2, Summer 1992.
- "Feed Russia's Pride, Not Just Its Stomach", (based on an address given at Princeton University), The Wall Street Journal, February 25, 1992.
- "The Search for a Modern Russian Identity", Bulletin: The American Academy of Arts and Sciences, January 1992 (edited version of "Russia's Fever Break", which appeared in the Wilson Quarterly, Autumn 1991).
- "Library of Congress to Open Collections to Local Libraries in Electronic Access Plans", American Libraries, Feature, September 1991.
- "Russia's Fever Break", The Wilson Quarterly, Autumn 1991.
- "U.S.S.R.: The Birth of a Nation", The Washington Post – Outlook, September 8, 1991.
- "The True Heroes of the Soviet Union", The New York Times Op-Ed, August 30, 1991.
- "The Crisis of Communism and the Future of Freedom", NBR Publications: NBR Analysis, v. 2, no. 3, July 1991.
- "The Crisis of Communism and the Future of Freedom", paper prepared for Conference on Global Responsibilities and National Interests, co-sponsored by the Carnegie Council on Ethics and International Affairs and DePauw University, and held June 1990 in Greencastle, Indiana. Ethics & International Affairs, 1991, v. 5.
- "Sovetskaia drama", Kar'era, no. 8 (16), April 1991, pp. 8–9.
- "Rossiia v poiskakh sebia", Nezavisimaia gazeta, June 4, 1991, p. 5 (publication of lecture given at U.S. Embassy, Moscow).
- "The Soviet Drama", two-part article, The Washington Post. 1. "Russia's Quest for Identity", January 21, 1990, and 2. "Looking to the Past", January 22, 1990.
- "James Billington on Russian Opera", The Washington Opera, Winter 1989.
- "Russia: the Search for a New Identity", Geopolitique – Review of the International Institute of Geopolitics, Summer 1989, Paris.
- "Keeping the Faith in the USSR After a Thousand Years", Smithsonian Magazine, April 1989, pp. 130–143.
- "...Rossii nepovtorimye cherty", Literaturnaia gazeta, April 13, 1988, p. 2.
- "A Search for Leaders", A Symposium: What Future Directions for Academic Exchange? by Paul Seabury, A. Kenneth Pye, Mark Blitz and James H. Billington, The Annals, The American Academy of Political and Social Science, May 1987, Sage Publications, pp. 161–163.
- "Realism and Vision in American Foreign Policy", Foreign Affairs, February 1987.
- "Soviet Power and the Unity of the Industrial Democracies", The Atlantic Community Quarterly, Winter 1986–87, vol. 24, no. 4, pp. 374–379 (adaptation of address given at symposium – "The Critical Triangle – Japan, the USA and the USSR", Sponsored by the Asahi Shimbun, Tokyo, April 21, 1986).
- "Liberty, Equality, Fraternity – Old Ideals, New Revolution", Jubilee, Summer 1984, pp. 7–12.
- "With Russia: After 50 Years. A Time of Danger, an Opening for Dialogue", The Washington Post, November 20, 1983.
- "The Essentials: Goodness, Beauty, Truth", Envoy (The Catholic University of America), Fall 1983.
- "Russia After Brezhnev: A Nation in Search of a New Identity", The Washington Post, November 14, 1982.
- "Revolution and Its Discontents: The Revolutionary Faith in the Modern World", Syracuse Scholar, no. 2, Fall 1981.
- "The World's Fight: 17. An Innovation in International Scholarship", American Oxonian, no. 2, Spring 1981.
- "Christianity in the USSR", Theology Today, July 1980.
- "Fire in the Minds of Men", Wilson Quarterly, Summer 1980.
- "The Crisis of Legitimacy", Theology Today, July 1976.
- "The Gun Within", Newsweek, October 6, 1975.
- "The Strange Death of Liberal Education", Furman Magazine, Fall 1972.
- "Fulbright Success Story", New York Times Op-Ed page, December 13, 1971.
- "Purpose in the University", Theology Today, January 1971.
- "Address to the Rhodes Scholar Sailing Party, 1969", American Oxonian, April 1970.
- "A Ferment of Intellectuals", Life, January 10, 1969.
- "The Humanistic Heartbeat Has Failed", Life, January 10, 1969.
- "Force and Counterforce in Eastern Europe", Foreign Affairs, October 1968.
- Two articles on the Czech Crisis in Life, May 24, 1968.
- Articles on Russia in Life, September 22 and November 10, 1967.
- "Six Views of the Russian Revolution", World Politics, no. 18, April 1966, pp. 452–473.
- "Soviet Youth is Getting Out of (Party) Line", University: A Princeton Quarterly, 1965–66, winter (No. 27).
- "Science in Russian Culture", American Scientist, June 1964.
- "Images of Muscovy", Slavic Review, March 1962.
- "Five Clues to the Khrushchev Riddle", New York Times Sunday Magazine, October 29, 1961, lead article.
- "The Intelligentsia and the Religion of Humanity", American Historical Review, July 1960.
- "Nikita Khrushchev and 'Doctor Zhivago,'" New York Times Sunday Magazine, November 9, 1958, lead article.
- "The Renaissance of the Russian Intelligentsia", Foreign Affairs, 1957, April.
- "The Bolshevik Debt to Russian Populism", Occidente, 1956, no. 4.
- "Thoughts on America and the Cold War", Freedom and Union, 1952, Autumn.

== Notes ==
Government offices
Preceded by Daniel Boorstin	Librarian of Congress; 1987–2015	Succeeded by David Mao; Acting
