= Dwight D. Opperman =

American businessman and lawyer (1923–2013)

Dwight Darwin Opperman (June 26, 1923 – June 13, 2013) was an American businessman and lawyer. He was known as CEO of West Publishing Company, and was known for establishing WestLaw. He was a member of the board of his alma mater, Drake University, and was the university's most generous benefactor.

== Early life and education ==
Dwight Darwin Opperman was born on June 26, 1923 in Perry, Iowa.

He served in the U.S. Army in World War II, before enrolling at Drake University. He received his law degree from Drake University Law School in Des Moines, Iowa, graduating in 1951. He also earned a second degree.

== Career ==
After graduation, Opperman started working at West Publishing Company as an editor. After around ten years as an editor, he rose through the leadership ranks to become president in 1968 and then CEO. He remained in this position until West was acquired by Thomson Corporation in 1996.

During his time as CEO, the company moved into technology products, with the creation of the Westlaw legal database, an online research tool for legal professionals, researchers, and students worldwide.

Opperman was later chairman of Key Investments, a privately held venture capital firm in Minneapolis focusing on high-tech ventures.

He also served on the boards of Drake Law School, New York University School of Law, William & Mary School of Law, and the Supreme Court Historical Society.

=== Other roles and philanthropy ===
Opperman was Drake University's most generous benefactor. He endowed the Opperman Scholars, program which provides scholarships to five incoming students at Drake University each year. These are full-tuition scholarships along with a cash stipend for living expenses ($10,000 as of 2025), renewable provided the student remains in the upper third of his or her class.

Opperman also endowed the Dwight D. Opperman Constitutional Law Lecture at Drake, a lecture given annually by the nation's foremost scholars in the field of constitutional law, most often, U.S. Supreme Court justices. Past lecturers include: Chief Justice John G. Roberts Jr., Justice Stephen Breyer, Justice Antonin Scalia, Justice Clarence Thomas, Chief Justice William H. Rehnquist, Justice Ruth Bader Ginsburg, Justice Sandra Day O'Connor, Justice Anthony M. Kennedy, Justice Lewis F. Powell, and Justice Harry A. Blackmun.

In the 1980s, Opperman established the Devitt Award, an important award for federal judges. The recipient is selected by a committee, chaired by a Supreme Court justice. At the time of Opperman's death in 2013, Anthony Kennedy was the chair.

In 1994 Opperman funded a campus plaza was dedicated in memory of his wife, Jeanice Opperman, who died in 1993. Drake's main law building and law library, also largely funded by him, were named in Opperman's honor.

He also donated to the Law Library of Congress.

His wife, Julie Chrystyn Opperman, donated two volumes of an extraordinarily rare 1478 edition of the Casus breves of Johannes de Turnhout (c. 1446–1492).

== Recognition ==
Opperman was the inaugural recipient of the Library of Congress Wickersham Award, which "recognizes an individual who exemplifies exceptional public service and dedication to the legal profession".

== Personal life and death ==
Opperman's first wife Jeanice died in 1993, and he married Julie Chrystyn in 2008.

Opperman died of liver cancer on June 13, 2013, at home in Beverly Hills, California, aged 89.

== Opperman Foundation ==
Opperman founded the Dwight D. Opperman Foundation, a nonprofit with ties to the Supreme Court. Robert Newlen was head of the Opperman Foundation after retiring from his post as deputy Librarian of Congress in 2017. In 2024 the foundation chair was Julie Opperman.

Newlen implemented the annual Justice Ruth Bader Ginsburg Woman of Leadership Award (RBG Award) in 2019, in honour of Supreme Court Justice Ruth Bader Ginsburg, and with input from Ginsburg about the award criteria. The original purpose of the award was "to recognise an extraordinary woman who has exercised a positive and notable influence on society and served as an exemplary role model in both principles and practice". Philanthropist and activist Agnes Gund won the inaugural RBG Award, which was given in early 2020 by Ginsburg herself. Ginsburg died later in 2020. Other recipients of the award were: Queen Elizabeth II (2021); Belgian fashion designer Diane von Fürstenberg (2022); and singer Barbra Streisand (2023). The venue for the awards was the Library of Congress.

In 2024, the RBG Award panel, which had more than doubled in size, was chaired by attorney Brendan V. Sullivan, Jr., who in 1987 represented Oliver North in the Iran-Contra hearings. After changing the rules to include five "trailblazing men and women" in the awards that year, the recipients were announced to be Elon Musk, financier Michael Milken, Rupert Murdoch, Martha Stewart, and Sylvester Stallone. Ginsburg's family objected strongly and there was opposition in the press and on social media. This led to the cancellation of the ceremony and the award. On March 18, 2024, foundation chair Julie Opperman announced that the awards would not be given, and that the foundation would "reconsider its mission and make a judgment about how or whether to proceed in the future."

As of January 2025, the Dwight D Opperman Foundation website is "under revision".
