= David S. Mao =

American law librarian

David Mao
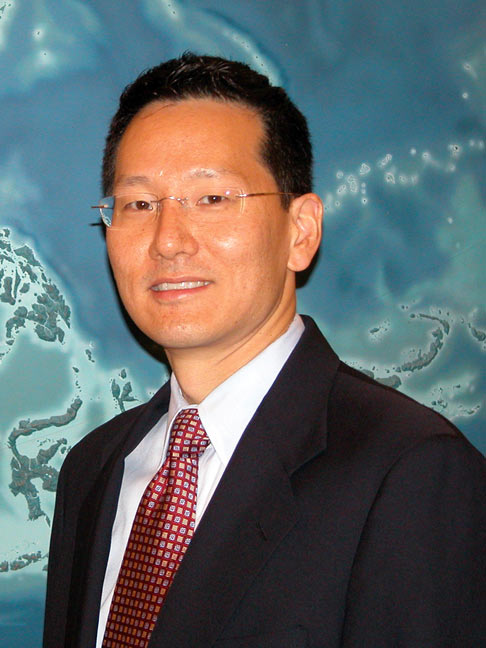

Librarian of Congress
- Acting
- In office October 1, 2015 – September 14, 2016
- President: Barack Obama
- Preceded by: James Billington
- Succeeded by: Carla Hayden

Personal details
- Born: New York City, U.S.
- Education: George Washington University (BA); Georgetown University (JD); Catholic University of America (MLIS)

David S. Mao is an American law librarian who has served as the 12th librarian of the Supreme Court of the United States since 2024. Mao served as acting librarian of Congress from September 30, 2015, until the confirmation of Carla Hayden in 2016.

== Early life ==
David S. Mao was born in New York City and grew up in the Lawrenceville section of Lawrence Township, Mercer County, New Jersey, where he attended the Lawrenceville School. He completed his undergraduate studies with a degree in international affairs from the George Washington University in 1990, and subsequently earned a J.D. degree from Georgetown University Law Center in 1993 and a master's degree in library science from The Catholic University of America in 1998.

== Career ==
Mao came to the Library of Congress in 2005, when he was hired by the American Law Division in the Congressional Research Service (CRS). Before arriving at CRS, he held positions at the Georgetown University Law Library and within the research library of the international law firm of Covington and Burling LLP. He also was an adjunct professor at the University of Maryland–College Park. In 2010, he joined the Law Library of Congress as its first deputy law librarian, and then became the 23rd law librarian of Congress January, 2012. On January 12, 2015, Mao was appointed to the deputy librarian of Congress office, by then-librarian of Congress James Billington.

As law librarian, Mao managed the operation and policy administration of the Law Library of Congress, which contains the world's largest collection of legal materials and serves as the leading research center for foreign, comparative, and international law. During his tenure as Law Librarian, he brought to the Library a copy of the 1215 Magna Carta for a historic exhibition on the eve of the charter's 800th anniversary.

Mao served as the first acting librarian of Congress from September 30, 2015, until the confirmation of Carla Hayden in 2016. He is the first Asian-American to hold the position.

In 2017 he became the chief operating officer of his alma mater, Georgetown University Law School.

In 2024, he became the 12th librarian of the Supreme Court of the United States.

Political offices
Preceded by James Billington	Librarian of Congress; Acting; 2015–2016	Succeeded by Carla Hayden
