= Robert Newlen =

American librarian and acting Librarian of Congress since 2025

- Newlen in 2026

Acting Librarian of Congress
- Disputed
- Assumed office May 8, 2025; Disputed with Todd Blanche (Note: Since Hayden's dismissal by Donald Trump, the role of acting librarian has been disputed between the principal deputy, Newlen, and Trump's named appointee, Todd Blanche.)
- President: Donald Trump
- Preceded by: Carla Hayden

Personal details
- Born: Robert Randolph Newlen Washington, D.C., U.S.
- Education: Bridgewater College (BA); American University (MA); Catholic University (MLS)
- Occupation: Librarian

Robert Randolph Newlen is an American librarian who, as principal deputy librarian of the United States Library of Congress, became a disputed acting librarian of Congress following the dismissal of Carla Hayden in May 2025 by the Trump administration. In 2026 he was awarded American Library Association Honorary Membership, the Association's highest honor.

== Early life and education ==
Robert Randolph Newlen was born at the now-demolished Sibley Hospital in Washington, D.C. and is a third-generation D.C. native. He is a graduate of Bridgewater College, from which he received a bachelor of arts in political science and French in 1975. In 1979, he received a master of arts in art history from American University, focusing on nineteenth-century and twentieth-century paintings. Newlen also holds a Master of Library Science from the Catholic University of America.

== Career ==
A few months after graduating from Bridgewater College, Newlen began working at the Library of Congress in November 1975, specifically for the Congressional Research Service (CRS). He was employed as a clerk and typist, delivering letters across the Thomas Jefferson Building.

During his time at the Library of Congress, Newlen has served in various leadership positions. These have included supervisory team leader of the Senate Reference Center; head of the CRS Legislative Relations Office; and head of the Inquiry Unit. He also served as assistant law librarian for Collections, Outreach & Services; a fundraiser for and coordinator of the “Magna Carta: Muse and Mentor” exhibit; Library of Congress chief of staff; and deputy Librarian of Congress. In 2017, Newlen retired as deputy Librarian of Congress.

Following his 2017 retirement from the Library of Congress, Newlen was executive director and director of strategic initiatives for The Dwight D. Opperman Foundation.

In 2023, the Librarian of Congress, Carla Hayden, announced that she had appointed Newlen as the interim director of the Congressional Research Service following the resignation of the CRS director, Mary Mazanec. Newlen was appointed the Principal Deputy Librarian of Congress on March 29, 2025.

=== Librarian of Congress dispute ===
On May 8, 2025, Carla Hayden was abruptly fired by President Donald Trump through an email sent to Hayden. In a separate email, Newlen proclaimed that he would serve as the acting librarian of Congress "until further instruction". On May 12, four days after Hayden's dismissal, Trump appointed Todd Blanche, the deputy attorney general, as the acting librarian of Congress. Newlen did not immediately recognize Blanche's appointment. Another official of the library who was dismissed shortly after Hayden, Shira Perlmutter has sued to dispute the legality of her dismissal, as her position as Register of Copyrights is appointed by, and responsible to, the Librarian of Congress. Newlen was also appointed by Hayden.

=== American Library Association ===
Newlen served for multiple terms on Council of the American Library Association including the Executive Board. He was also an Endowment Trustee. Newlen ran for president of the American Library Association for the 2004–2005 term.

He was awarded the Association's ALA Medal of Excellence in 2016 for his "creative leadership of high order, particularly in library management." In 2021, he was honored with the Joseph W. Lippincott Award for distinguished service to the profession of librarianship. In 2026 he was awarded Honorary Membership.
