= Fire in the Minds of Men =

1980 book by James H. Billington

Fire in the Minds of Men: Origins of the Revolutionary Faith
- Fire in the Minds of Men: Origins of the Revolutionary Faith
- Author: James H. Billington
- Language: English
- Publisher: Transaction Publishers
- Publication date: 1980
- Pages: 677 (paperback)
- ISBN: 978-0-7658-0471-6
- OCLC: 39074080
- Dewey Decimal: 303.6/4/09034 21
- LC Class: HM283 .B54 1999

Fire in the Minds of Men: Origins of the Revolutionary Faith is a 1980 book by historian James H. Billington about the spread of ideas. Billington analyzes the ideas that inspired European revolutionary movements from the 1700s to the 1900s.

== Synopsis ==
The book takes its name from Dostoevsky's The Possessed, and it attempts to investigate the passion for revolutionary change which developed strongly in Central Europe and Russia starting with the French Revolution of 1789. Unlike many other histories of revolutions and revolutionaries Billington does not focus on events and social causes leading to popular uprisings. Instead he follows a sometimes almost invisible thread of incendiary ideas sometimes transferred via occult societies, but all having common genesis in the motto of the French Revolution: "Liberté, égalité, fraternité". In Billington's historiography he presents the second and third terms as reactions to and expansions of the more rudimentary (and susceptible to egoism) concept of liberty. He describes how the idea of brotherhood was inherited from secret and occult societies such as the freemasons and became an inflammatory idea which led to the Paris Commune but then was extinguished as far as popular revolutions went (until it resurfaced as national socialism in 1920s' Germany). Instead the idea of equality would become the fuel for socialism and communism. Billington equates the two schools of thought, claiming that though socially opposed in outside appearance, in their own respective way (one promoting individualism, the other collectivism), each is striving toward establishing these mutual goals, viz. a secular humanist society that is both egalitarian and utilitarian. These two social power factions were founded by the two thinkers Proudhon and Marx, the former being the social and secularist republican (anti-monarchist) individualist, and the latter the socialist anarchist (communism) collectivist.
