= Todd Blanche =

American attorney (born 1974)

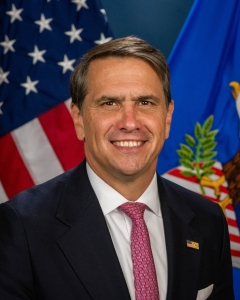
- Official portrait, 2026

88th United States Attorney General
- Incumbent
- Assumed office April 2, 2026 (Note: Acting: April 2, 2026 – August 10, 2026)
- President: Donald Trump
- Deputy: Himself (Note: During his tenure as acting attorney general); Trent McCotter (acting)
- Preceded by: Pam Bondi

40th United States Deputy Attorney General
- In office March 6, 2025 – August 10, 2026
- President: Donald Trump
- Preceded by: Lisa Monaco
- Succeeded by: Trent McCotter (acting)

Acting Librarian of Congress
- Disputed (Note: The legality of Blanche's appointment and tenure as the acting librarian of Congress is disputed. The staff of the Library of Congress have asserted that Robert Newlen, the library's principal deputy librarian, is the acting librarian.)
- Assumed office May 12, 2025; Disputed with Robert Newlen
- Appointed by: Donald Trump
- Preceded by: Carla Hayden

Personal details
- Born: Todd Wallace Blanche; August 6, 1974 (age 52) Denver, Colorado, U.S.
- Party: Republican (since 2024)
- Other political affiliations: Democratic (before 2024)
- Spouse: Kristine Blanche (m. 1996)
- Children: 2
- Education: American University (BA); Brooklyn Law School (JD)
- Blanche's voice Blanche on the 2026 White House Correspondents' Dinner shooting Recorded April 27, 2026

Todd Wallace Blanche (/blæntʃ/; born August 6, 1974) is an American attorney and former prosecutor who is the 88th United States attorney general, having served in an acting capacity from April 2026 until his confirmation in August. Blanche has also served as the 40th deputy U.S. attorney general from 2025 to 2026 and as the acting librarian of Congress since 2025, although the legality of the latter appointment has been disputed.

Blanche graduated from American University in 1996 and from Brooklyn Law School in 2003. He worked in the United States Attorney's Office for the Southern District of New York's violent crimes division for eight years. In 2017, Blanche became a partner at Cadwalader, Wickersham & Taft. Blanche represented several figures associated with President Donald Trump and former New York City mayor Rudy Giuliani, including Trump's former campaign manager, Paul Manafort, Igor Fruman, and Boris Epshteyn.

In April 2023, Trump hired Blanche to defend him for concealed hush-money payments to Stormy Daniels and he led Trump's defense in the 2024 criminal trial. Blanche later defended Trump in cases involving federal classified documents and election obstruction. In November 2024, following his victory in the 2024 presidential election, President-elect Donald Trump announced Blanche as his nominee for deputy attorney general. Blanche was confirmed by the Senate in March 2025.

In May 2025, Trump dismissed the librarian of Congress, Carla Hayden, and named Blanche to succeed her. The staff of the Library of Congress and Hayden disputed Trump's authority to appoint Blanche without the consent of the Senate, arguing that Robert Newlen, the principal deputy librarian, was Hayden's lawful successor. In April 2026, Trump fired Pam Bondi as attorney general and Blanche became her acting successor. In June, Trump nominated Blanche to serve as attorney general. He was confirmed by the Senate and sworn in the following month.

== Early life and education (1974–2003) ==
Todd Wallace Blanche was born on August 6, 1974, in Denver, Colorado. Blanche's father, Richard, was a Canadian hockey player and his mother was a nurse. Blanche was raised in Denver. Blanche's father led a religious congregation, the Faith Bible Fellowship, in his basement. After complaints from neighbors, the congregation was charged with a zoning violation. Richard was cited for contempt but vowed to preach from prison and to appeal the ruling. The Colorado Supreme Court later ruled against him. The Blanches moved to Gainesville, Florida, in 1987.

Blanche attended the New Mexico Military Institute, where he was an outstanding athlete. In 1992, he attended Louisiana State University, but transferred the following year to Beloit College, where he played on the basketball and baseball teams. By 1994, Blanche had transferred to American University and graduated with a bachelor’s degree in 1996. He married Kristine, and the couple had two children. Blanche told FT Magazine that he was drawn to American University because of an interest in politics. He also sought to be closer to Kristine, whom he had met in Australia.

Blanche interned at the United States Attorney's Office for the District of Columbia, a position that later became a full-time job. He later worked as a paralegal in the United States Attorney's Office for the Southern District of New York and attended Brooklyn Law School at night. Blanche graduated cum laude from law school in 2003.

== Legal career ==
=== Clerk and prosecutorial work (2003–2014) ===
After graduating from Brooklyn Law School, Blanche worked for Davis Polk as an associate and temporarily clerked for judge Denny Chin of the District Court for the Southern District of New York and judge Joseph F. Bianco of the District Court for the Eastern District of New York. In 2006, he returned to the United States Attorney's Office for the Southern District of New York (SDNY) as an assistant United States attorney. Blanche worked in the office's violent-crimes division for eight years, eventually becoming its co-chief. While at SDNY he worked alongside Alvin Bragg who then later was the prosecutor for the Stormy Daniels hush-money case in which Blanche defended Trump. Blanche later ran the district's branch office in White Plains, New York, alongside Mimi Rocah. According to FT Magazine, colleagues believed that Blanche had been marked for a judicial nomination.

=== Private practice (2014–2023) ===
After working in the United States Attorney's Office for the Southern District of New York, Blanche joined WilmerHale. He joined Cadwalader, Wickersham & Taft as a partner in 2017. By June 2019, Blanche had begun representing the political operative Paul Manafort after he was indicted on state mortgage fraud charges in New York. Blanche filed a motion to dismiss the charges on grounds that it violated New York's laws on double jeopardy; the indictment was dismissed on the state's double jeopardy law in December, a decision affirmed by the New York Supreme Court in October 2020. Blanche additionally represented the businessman Igor Fruman, an associate of Rudy Giuliani who was implicated in the Trump–Ukraine scandal, as well as the attorney Boris Epshteyn. According to The New York Times, Blanche represented Manafort and Epshteyn in his personal capacity with the approval of Cadwalader, Wickersham & Taft.

=== Work for Trump (2023–2024) ===
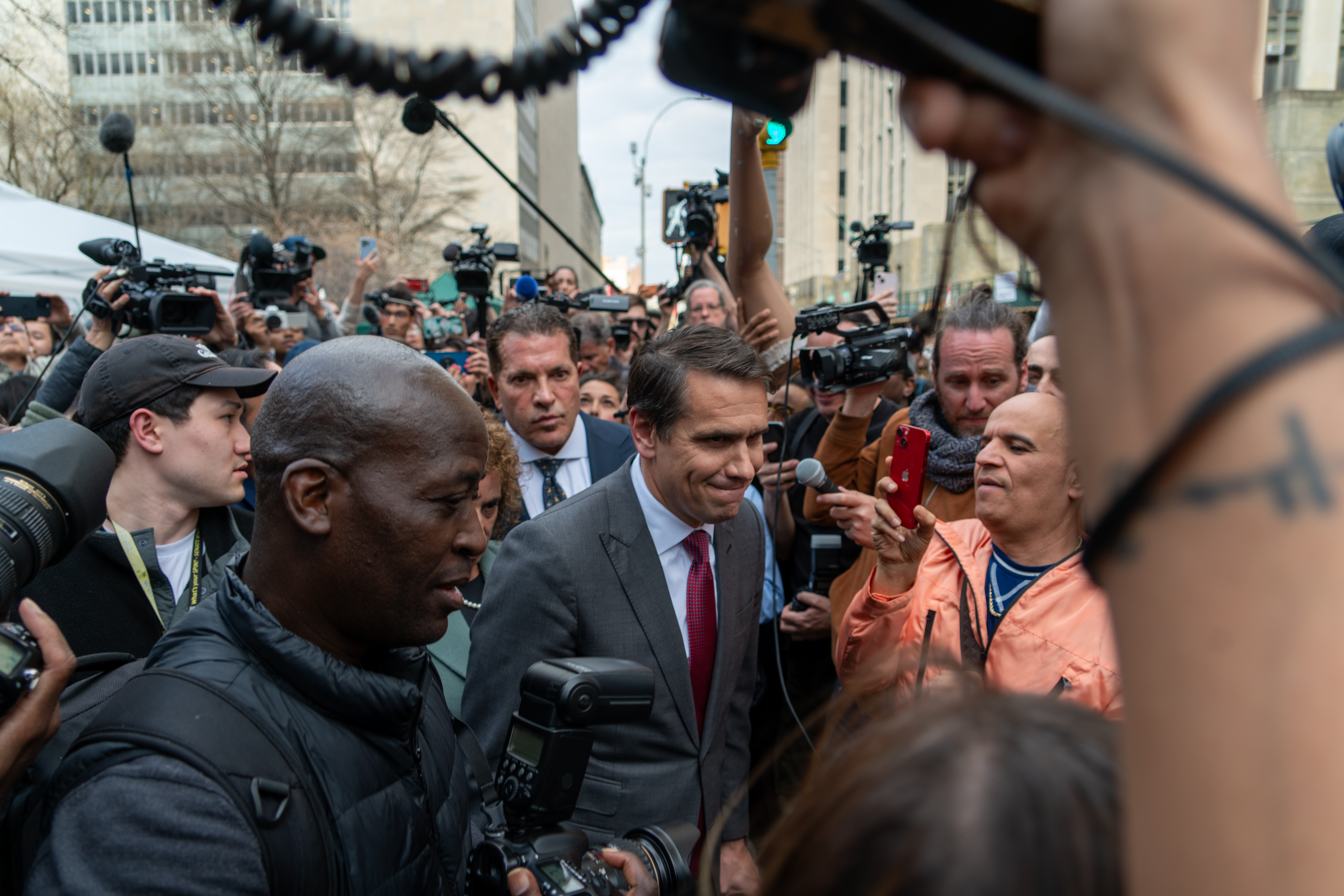
Blanche leaving the Manhattan Criminal Courthouse after Donald Trump's arraignment

In February 2023, as Trump was set to be indicted in New York over concealed hush-money payments to Stormy Daniels, he appointed Epshteyn to find lawyers to represent him. Epshteyn requested that Blanche assist him in the search. In April, one day before he was set to be arraigned, Trump added Blanche to his defense team. That month, Blanche founded Blanche Law. According to The New York Times, Epshteyn and Manafort referred Trump to Blanche. The Times additionally reported that Cadwalader, Wickersham & Taft's reputational committee disagreed with Blanche's decision to represent Trump; Blanche, for his part, told associates that he was displeased at the firm's unwillingness to give him latitude. After he was federally indicted for allegedly retaining classified documents at Mar-a-Lago, Trump removed James Trusty and John Rowley from his defense and named Blanche instead. Trump largely relied on Blanche as he remained one of two lawyers, alongside Christopher Kise, to represent him in the case. Blanche continued to represent Trump in the federal election obstruction case against him. Prior to representing Donald Trump, Blanche was a registered Democrat. In 2024, he switched his party affiliation to Republican.

Blanche led Trump's defense in his criminal trial in New York. He sought to delay the trial past the 2024 presidential election, in which Trump was a candidate, a strategy that Trump's allies saw as successful; judge Juan Merchan granted Trump a limited three-week delay. Blanche developed a close relationship with Trump, and his litigation on behalf of the former president represented several claims that Trump had publicly alleged to discredit the prosecution, including that Trump was a victim of political prosecution. Prior to the trial, Merchan criticized Blanche for using casual language in his court filings, for improperly accusing the District Attorney's Office of New York County of prosecutorial misconduct, and for not directly answering a question. Additionally, Blanche's initial plan involved finding a juror who would force Merchan to declare a mistrial; the jury unanimously decided to convict Trump in May. Blanche's defense strategy involved downplaying the payments and casting Michael Cohen, Trump's former lawyer, and Daniels as unreliable narrators intent on seeking revenge or financial restitution from Trump. In the trial, he loudly sparred with Cohen. In November 2024, ABC News reported that Blanche's phone had been hacked by Chinese threat actors.

== United States Deputy Attorney General (2025–2026) ==
=== Nomination and confirmation ===
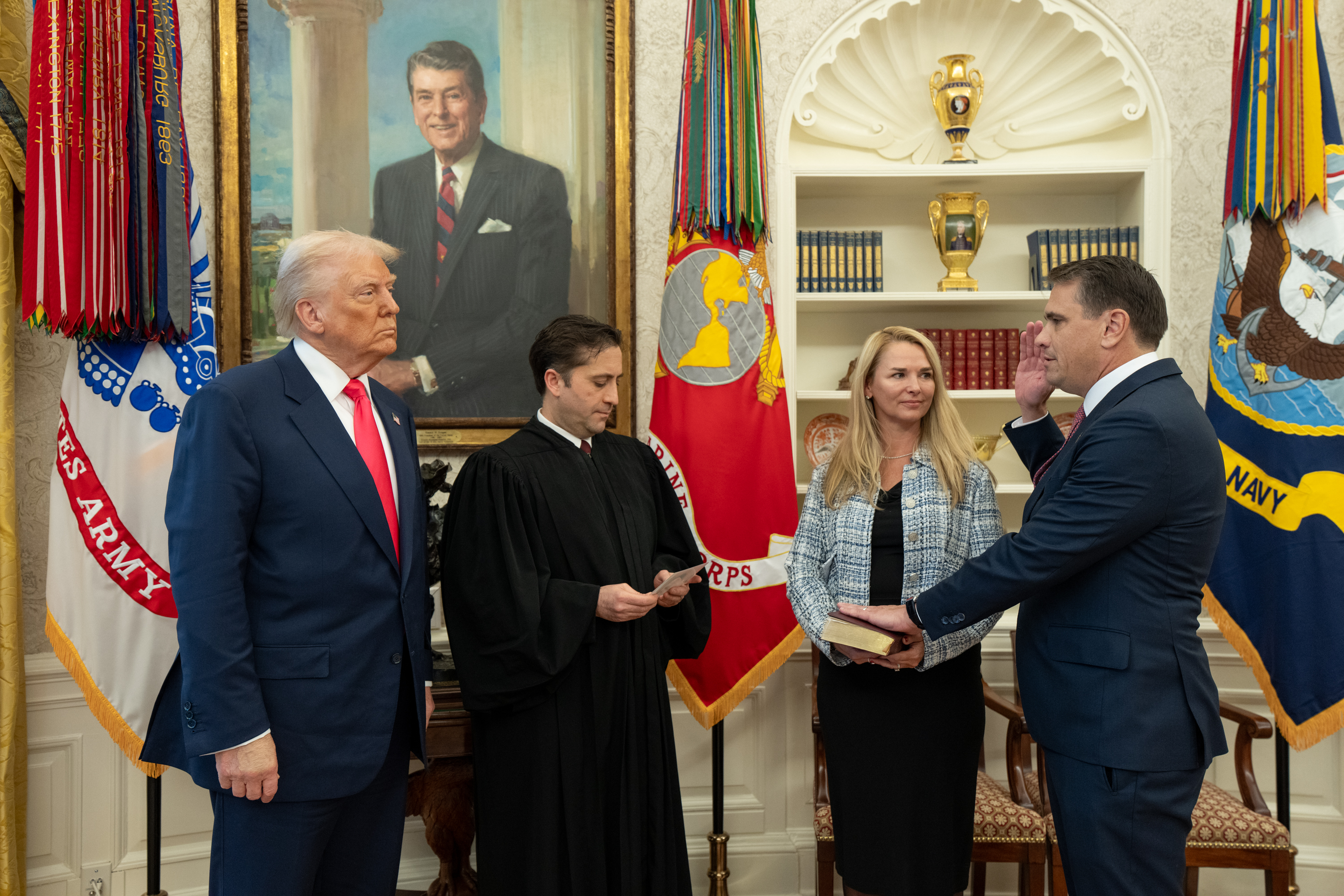
Blanche is sworn in as deputy attorney general in March 2025.

In October 2024, documents obtained by ABC News indicated that Blanche was being considered as potential nominees for deputy attorney general and White House counsel, in addition to director of the Federal Bureau of Investigation, if Trump were to win the 2024 presidential election. Following Trump's victory in the election the following month, Blanche was expected to have a position in his administration. On November 14, Trump named Blanche as his nominee for deputy attorney general. Blanche appeared before the Senate Committee on the Judiciary on February 12, 2025. He defended Trump against perceived allegations of prosecutorial impropriety and cited his experience in defending Trump to claim that the president would not ask him to "do anything illegal or immoral". In his testimony, Blanche claimed that he had no knowledge of plans to dismiss the criminal corruption case against New York City mayor Eric Adams; a draft letter by the interim United States attorney for the Southern District of New York, Danielle Sassoon, indicated that Blanche was on the "same page" about dismissing the case. The committee voted to advance his nomination on February 27 in a 12–10 vote along party lines. On March 5, Blanche was confirmed by the Senate in a 52–46 vote largely along party lines.

=== Initial actions ===
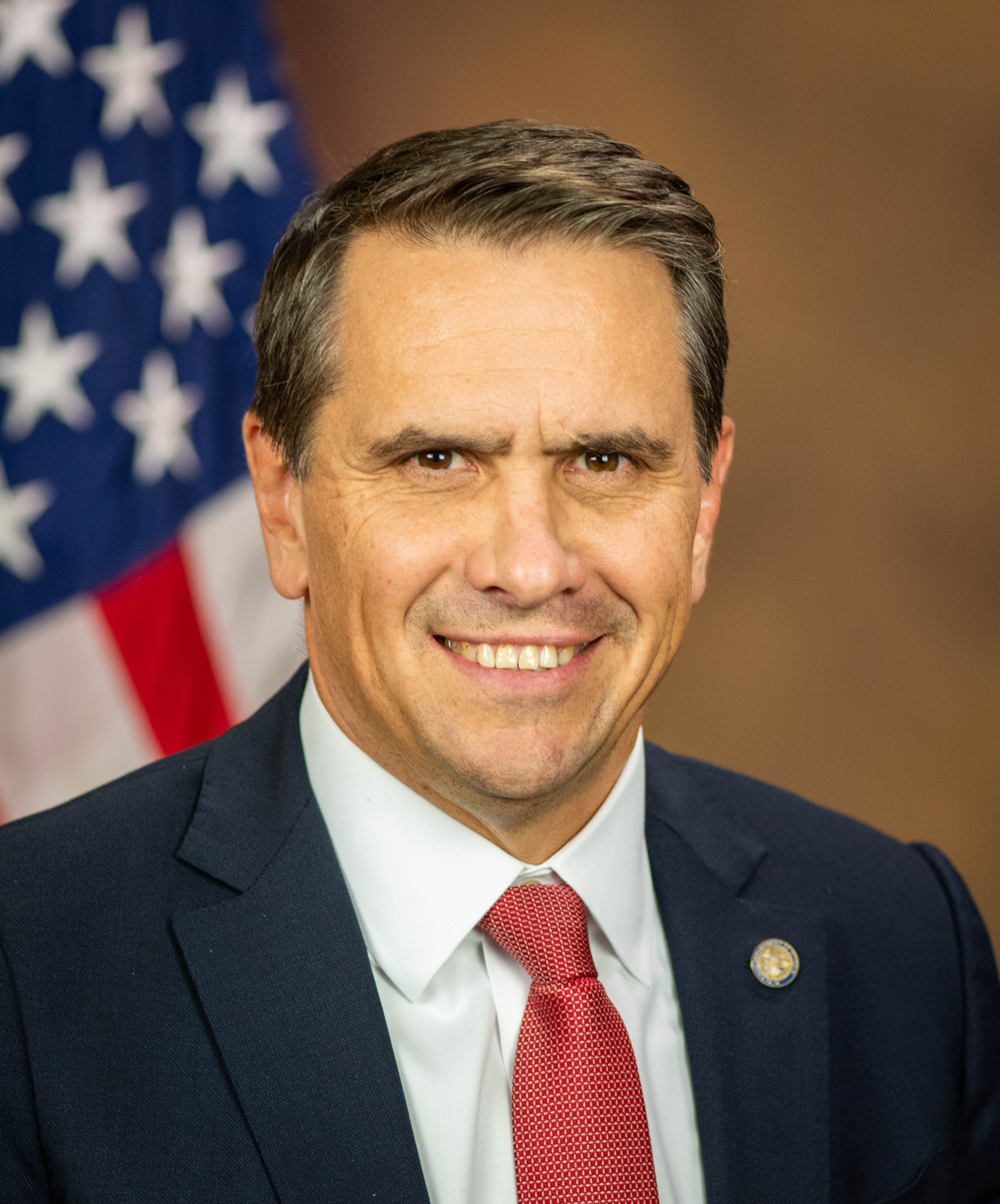
Official portrait, 2025

On March 6, Blanche was sworn in. Hours later, he issued a memorandum shifting hiring for the Department of Justice towards the Mexico–United States border in an effort to bolster Trump's immigration policy. The order sought an exemption from the federal hiring freeze. Blanche also issued a directive titled "Operation Take Back America", which reorganized the Organized Crime Drug Enforcement Task Forces and Project Safe Neighborhoods to prioritize immigration enforcement, including the removal of undocumented immigrants with criminal records and the prosecution of individuals who obstructed deportations in sanctuary city jurisdictions. The following day, he placed two prosecutors involved in the Adams case on leave. He dismissed Liz Oyer, the pardon attorney. Oyer claimed that she was removed after she rejected Blanche's request to add the actor Mel Gibson to a list of individuals who should have their gun rights restored. After The New York Times reported that U.S. intelligence contradicted Trump's assertion that the government of Venezuela was directing the Tren de Aragua syndicate to commit crimes—a finding that was used as the impetus for invoking the Alien Enemies Act—Blanche announced a leak investigation. That month, Blanche proposed combining the Drug Enforcement Administration with the Bureau of Alcohol, Tobacco, Firearms and Explosives.

Within two weeks of Blanche becoming deputy attorney general, Joseph Tirrell, the Justice Department's top ethics lawyer, told Blanche he would need to recuse himself from any cases involving Donald Trump in his personal capacity. This was because Blanche had previously served as Trump's personal lawyer, including defending him against criminal prosecution by the Justice Department in the election-obstruction and classified documents cases. Tirrell, who had begun directing the ethics office during Biden's presidency, was fired less than four months after his conversation with Blanche.

In April 2025, Blanche dismissed Erez Reuveni, the acting deputy director of the Office of Immigration Litigation, for conceding in court that Kilmar Abrego Garcia, a Salvadoran man, should not have been deported. That month, he barred the Department of Justice's lawyers from attending American Bar Association events and disbanded the National Cryptocurrency Enforcement Team; according to financial records, Blanche had several hundred thousand dollars in cryptocurrency. According to camera footage released in a court filing, Blanche ordered the arrest of Newark mayor Ras Baraka over an incident involving an immigration detention center. In a statement in June, Blanche argued that in attorney general Merrick Garland's tenure, the Department of Justice excessively prosecuted cases citing the Foreign Corrupt Practices Act and that the department would shift from prosecuting bribery cases overseas to conduct that harmed the United States's ability to compete abroad.

As attorney general Pam Bondi sought to fire employees at the Department of Justice, including ten staffers who worked for Jack Smith, the special counsel who indicted Trump twice, Blanche urged Bondi not to fire more employees, according to The New York Times. Concurrently, several Trump loyalists were installed across U.S. attorney's offices in New York and New Jersey. According to the Times, Blanche told Trump that the U.S. Attorney's Office for the Eastern District of New York was particularly important as it covered John F. Kennedy International Airport, the largest air passenger gateway into North America, and that he should rely on veteran prosecutors. Blanche disagreed with judges who appointed a federal prosecutor, Desiree Leigh Grace, to succeed Alina Habba as the interim United States attorney for the District of New Jersey, asserting that Trump had the right to remove Grace.

=== Handling of the Epstein case and Maxwell meeting ===
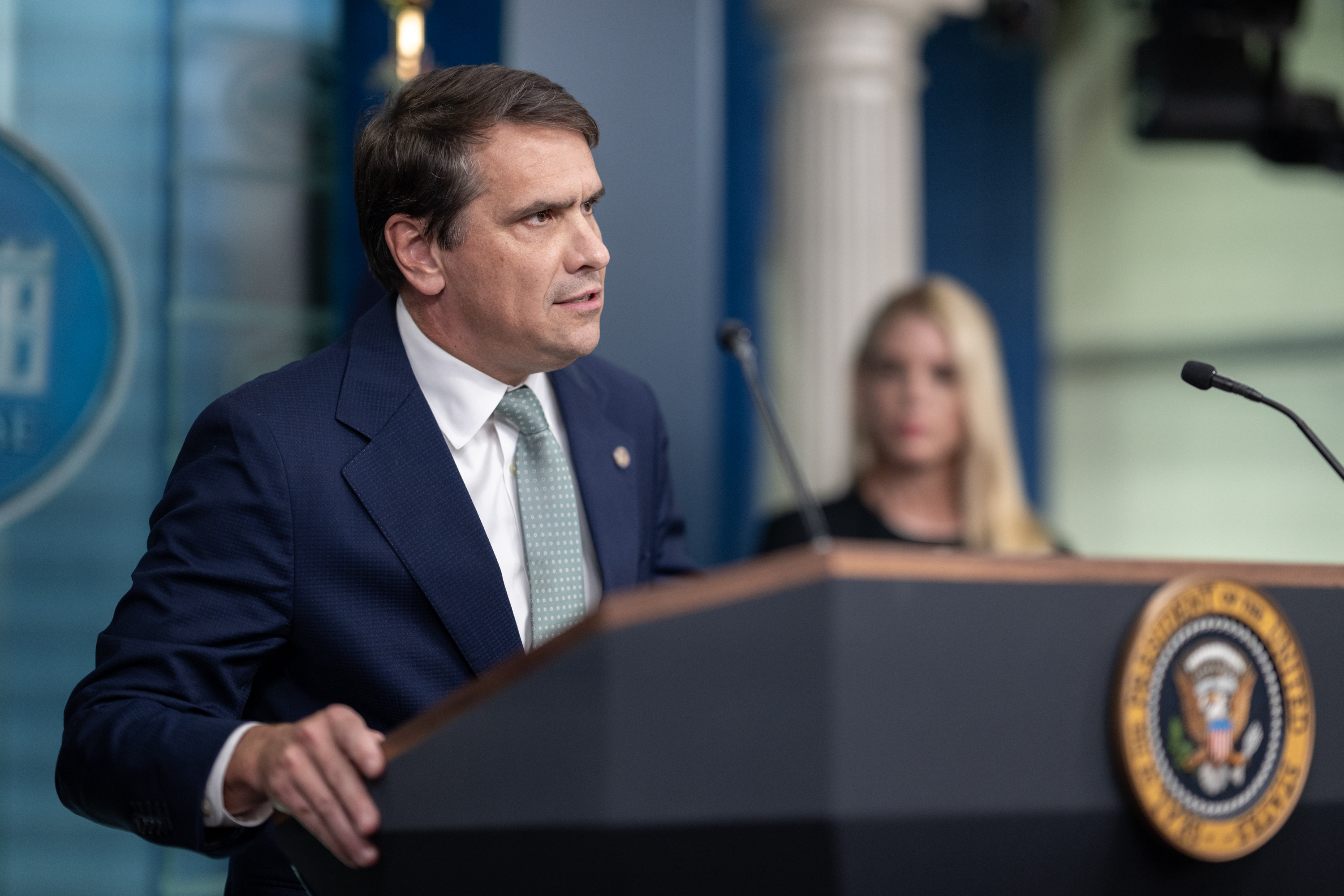
Blanche speaking at a press conference in June 2025

Bondi and Blanche informed Trump in May 2025 that his name was in the Epstein files, a set of documents associated with the deceased sex offender Jeffrey Epstein. In July 2025, criticism mounted over the Department of Justice's handling of the Epstein files. The controversy led to an open dispute between Bondi and the leadership of the Federal Bureau of Investigation, particularly its deputy director, Dan Bongino. Blanche wrote on X that he had signed off on the memorandum determining that "no further disclosure would be appropriate or warranted" in the investigation into Epstein alongside Bongino and the bureau's director, Kash Patel; the post insinuated that Bongino and Patel were as responsible for closing the inquiry as Blanche and Bondi. Bondi and Blanche later requested that a court unseal grand jury testimony from his second federal indictment.

In leading certain responsibilities of the handling of the Epstein files, The New York Times described Blanche as having an "unusual, Janus-faced position". Although Blanche's involvement with Trump, an Epstein associate, was not believed to be a conflict-of-interest, it presented a complex situation. According to the Times, he personally signed the Department of Justice's motion to unseal grand jury testimony in the case against Ghislaine Maxwell, Epstein's accomplice, after the prosecutor who worked on the Epstein and Maxwell cases, Maurene Comey, was fired. Additionally, Blanche had a personal relationship with David Oscar Markus, Maxwell's counsel. In July, Blanche requested a meeting with Maxwell. In preparation for the meeting, Blanche allowed Markus to access grand jury testimony, a move that could have allowed Maxwell to obtain information useful in seeking an appeal for her conviction.

The meeting between Blanche and Maxwell led to concerns from some opponents of Trump, including Senate minority leader Chuck Schumer, that Blanche may have offered Maxwell a favorable deal to ensure she would not mention Trump. Dick Durbin, the ranking member of the Senate Committee on the Judiciary, requested transcripts of Blanche's two-day meeting with Maxwell. In August, the Department of Justice released transcripts of the interview, indicating that Maxwell affirmed the official narrative of the Epstein case, though she stated that she believed Epstein's death was a murder, not a suicide. Maxwell additionally stated that she had not seen Trump "in any inappropriate setting in any way." Blanche defended Maxwell's transfer to a minimum security prison a week after his meeting, claiming Maxwell had experienced "numerous threats against her life."

In May 2026, Blanche stated that he would not recommend a pardon for Maxwell. On July 16, 2026, a self-identified survivor of Epstein's abuse testified that Blanche should not be confirmed as attorney general. The family of Virginia Giuffre sent a statement to the Judiciary committee saying they are "strongly" opposed to Blanche's confirmation. Sen. Thom Tillis, a Republican, told Blanche he needed to meet with the Epstein survivors before he would vote to approve Blanche's nomination. Blanche held a meeting later that day. Epstein victims who attended the meeting described Blanche's demeanor as "patronizing", "very condescending", and "intentionally noncommittal to survivors".

=== Department conflicts ===
In July 2025, Bloomberg Law reported that Chris Kise, who represented Trump alongside Blanche in the classified documents case, had appealed to Blanche to give leniency to former Puerto Rico governor Wanda Vázquez Garced, arguing that Vázquez Garced was the victim of political prosecution. Blanche agreed and ordered prosecutors to strike a deal with Vázquez Garced's defense. The following month, Bondi and Blanche conflicted with Ed Martin, the director of the Weaponization Working Group, over his stunt requesting that New York attorney general Letitia James resign and going to her residence to personally inspect her property. Bondi and Blanche defended Erik Siebert, the United States attorney for the Eastern District of Virginia, against claims that Siebert had not done enough to investigate James and James Comey, the director of the Federal Bureau of Investigation whom Trump had dismissed in May 2017 and the father of Maurene Comey. In particular, Blanche and Siebert questioned the validity of a criminal case against James as Bill Pulte, the director of the Federal Housing Finance Agency, sought to have her indicted on allegations of mortgage fraud, according to The New York Times.

After Trump appointed Todd Gilbert as the United States attorney for the Western District of Virginia in July, officials within the Department of Justice directed him to open an investigation into the handling of classified documents in the Mueller special counsel investigation. After Gilbert stated that he did not believe there was sufficient evidence for a grand jury indictment, aides to Bondi and Blanche accused Gilbert of consulting with Zachary Lee, whom they alleged was serving the interests of the prior Biden administration. Blanche spoke with Gilbert and encouraged him to pursue the case, offering additional resources. That month, Blanche threatened to prosecute officials in California who arrest federal officers conducting immigration enforcement in sanctuary jurisdictions. Additionally, after Trump appointed Lindsey Halligan to prosecute James in October, neither Bondi nor Blanche were informed of James's indictment in advance. Blanche oversaw the grand conspiracy investigation, led by U.S. attorney for the District of Southern Florida Jason Reding Quiñones.

=== Immigration enforcement ===
In January 2026, following the killing of Renée Good in Minneapolis, Blanche—who oversaw the Federal Bureau of Investigation—stated that the bureau would "ensure that evidence is collected and preserved". He asserted that a civil rights investigation did not have to be conducted into Good's death, actively resisting efforts to open an inquiry; stated that an "insurrection" had occurred in the state over opposition to Operation Metro Surge, repeating Trump's claims suggesting that the Insurrection Act could be invoked; and accused Minnesota governor Tim Walz and Minneapolis mayor Jacob Frey of committing "terrorism". After the killing of Alex Pretti that month, Blanche defended the agents who shot Pretti, but sought a tempered response to the ambiguity surrounding a bystander video.

=== Librarian of Congress appointment ===
On May 12, 2025, after dismissing Carla Hayden as the librarian of Congress, Donald Trump appointed Blanche to succeed her. The appointment led to a standoff at the James Madison Memorial Building, when two officials at the Department of Justice sought access to the Copyright Office, claiming that Blanche was the acting librarian of Congress. Staff members at the Library of Congress called Capitol Police and Meg Williams, the library's general counsel; Williams informed the officials that the library recognized Robert Newlen, the principal deputy librarian, as the acting librarian of Congress and that they were not permitted to enter.

== United States Attorney General (2026–present) ==
=== Acting appointment ===
Trump v. IRS addendum dated May 19, 2026 and signed by Todd Blanche

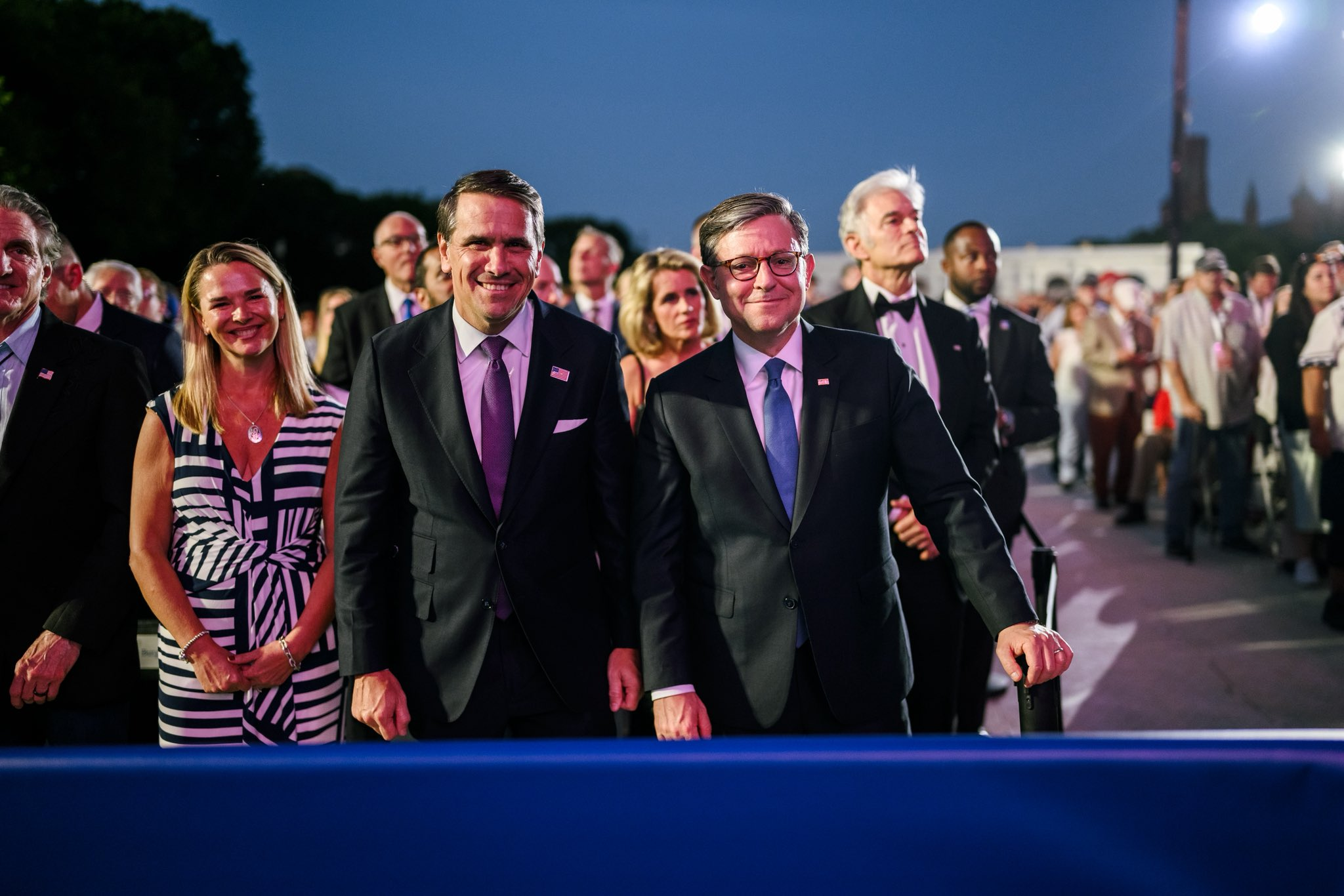
Blanche in 2026 with Speaker of the House, Mike Johnson

On April 2, 2026, Blanche became the acting attorney general after Trump fired Pam Bondi, allegedly over her handling of the Epstein files. Blanche's initial tenure was marked by a pursuit to prosecute Trump's political foes. He moved to intensify the investigation into John O. Brennan, the former director of the Central Intelligence Agency, as well as the grand conspiracy investigation; Blanche appointed the lawyer Joseph diGenova to lead the former inquiry. He additionally approved investigations into:

- Cassidy Hutchinson, a former White House aide who testified before the House Select Committee to Investigate the January 6th Attack on the United States Capitol.
- The political fundraising organization ActBlue, associated with the Democratic Party.
- The civil rights organization the Southern Poverty Law Center.

According to The New York Times, Blanche signaled that he sought to become Trump's nominee for attorney general. That month, he directed Bill Essayli, the first assistant U.S. attorney for the Central District of California, to seek the death penalty in a murder case involving three alleged MS-13 members; reclassified cannabis as a Schedule III controlled substance; and reauthorized execution by firing squad, gas chamber, electric chair, hanging and by pentobarbital.

On April 14, 2026, in response to a question by Laura Jarrett on NBC News, Blanche stated that Americans should be "happy" Trump was involved with the DOJ and that directing it was "what being the commander in chief is about". Blanche referred to Trump as "my boss" and said investigations into his political foes only made up a small portion of the Department's work, saying that there was "outsized focus" on the probes "because they involve individuals that the president has had significant issues — for good reason, by the way, within the past that will continue the rest of the time he's president".

=== Nomination and confirmation ===
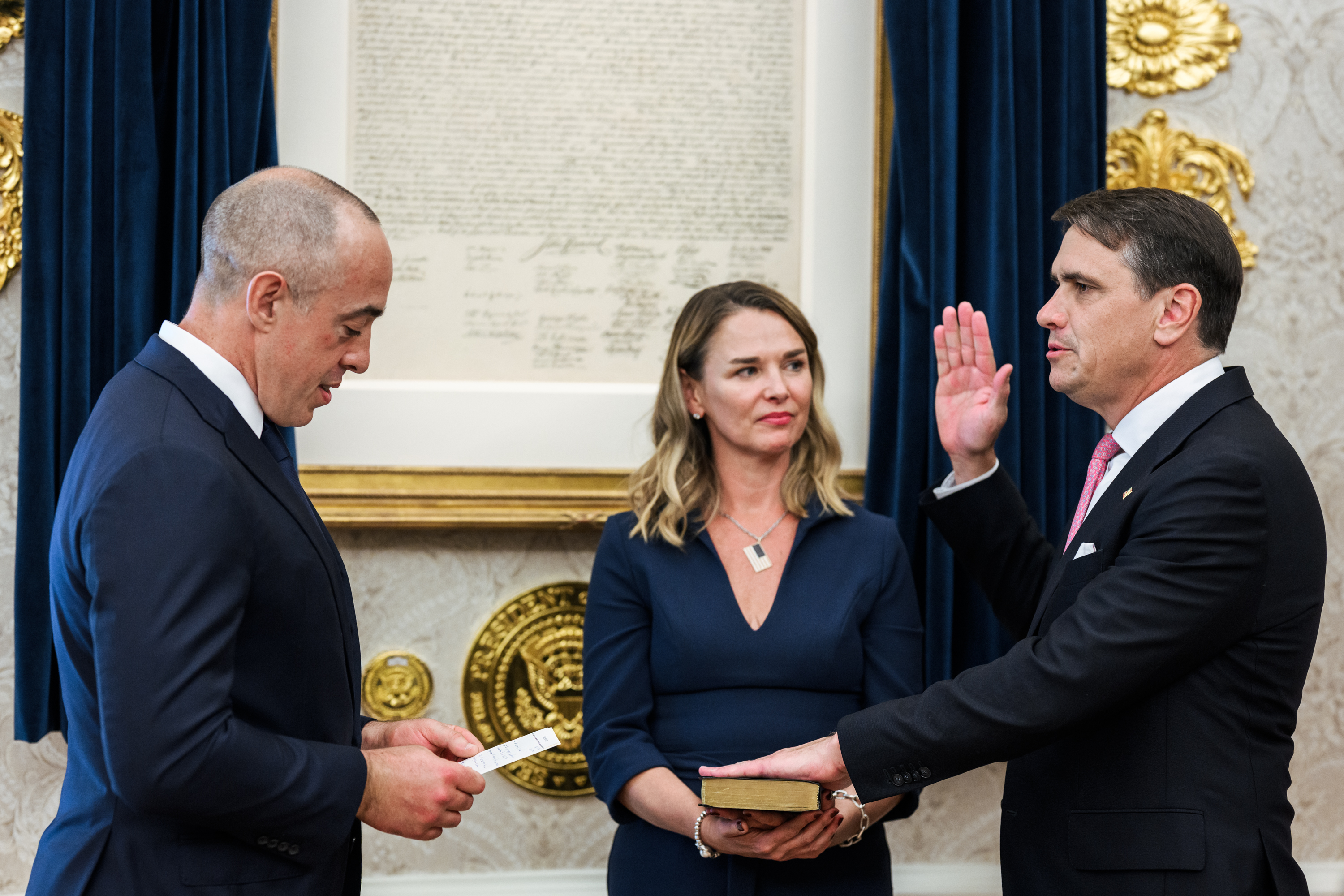
Blanche is sworn in as attorney general in August 2026.

At a closed event in the White House Rose Garden, Trump stated he would nominate Blanche as attorney general. On June 8, Trump submitted the nomination to the Senate. Over 1,200 former Department of Justice (DOJ) employees wrote the Senate Committee on the Judiciary, urging the members to reject Blanche's nomination. Former colleagues who supported Blanche in January 2025 when he was nominated for deputy attorney general declined to do so in July 2026, although some did, saying for example that he is, doing the hardest job in the country, while others cited the prosecution of James Comey, or other factors as a reason they could no longer support him.

On July 15, the U.S. Senate Finance Committee held a hearing on the nomination of Blanche for Attorney General. One of the questions asked was about Blanche's role the 1.8 billion fund (the anti-weaponization fund) for those who were purported to have been victims of the Justice Department. (Note: In an out-of-court settlement in Trump v. Internal Revenue Service with President Trump and his immediate family, the fund was created as part of the settlement after their tax returns were disclosed by an employee of the IRS who was later arrested.) Senator John Cornyn of Texas, a former judge, asked Blanche about the fund as well as the related agreement to President Trump and his immediate family having immunity to tax investigations. Blanche responded to Cornyn's question about the find with the statement, "The settlement fund is just not moving forward.".

Senator John Kennedy of Louisiana asked Blanche if he was a friend of President Trump, Blanche responded, "I am his attorney". Blanche quickly added, "Was his lawyer. And now I'm the deputy attorney general." Senator Chris Coons of Delaware asked Blanche about comments he had made at the Conservative Political Action Conference (CPAC), where Blanche was considered to have said that the pardons of January 6th U.S. Capitol attack rioters was an achievement by the Trump administration. This was based on the following statement by Blanche: If you look at what happened to the men and women convicted because of January 6, by 5 p.m. on January 20, every one of them was either pardoned or had their sentence commuted by President Trump. So, when folks say you've done nothing, I say you have a very short memory. On August 4, the Senate Judiciary Committee advanced his nomination in a 12–10 vote. On August 7, Sen. Bill Cassidy supported Blanche's nomination, which secured his confirmation despite opposition from GOP Senators Lisa Murkowski and Susan Collins.

Blanche was narrowly confirmed as attorney general in a 50–49 Senate vote early Saturday morning, August 8; he was sworn in by Judge Emil Bove on August 10.

=== Ethics complaints ===
In June 2025, 101 current and former federal judges and two legal advocacy groups―Democracy Defenders Fund and Lawyers Defending American Democracy―sent a 73-page ethics complaint to the Attorney Grievance Committee in the New York Office of Court Administration, raising concerns about Blanche's impartiality and identifying specific instances in which they allege that Blanche violated professional ethics standards or otherwise acted inappropriately. The DOJ responded that the complaint is a "stunt".

In May 2026, the legal advocacy group Campaign for Accountability asked the New York State Bar Association to investigate Blanche for violating rules of professional conduct in the Kilmar Abrego Garcia case. In the case of Trump v. Internal Revenue Service, Judge Kathleen M. Williams wrote that a so-called "settlement" reached by Blanche and the Department of Justice was "the product of collusion" and a "fraud on the court". Judge Williams also wrote that a copy of opinion should be sent to the State Bar of New York.

=== Tenure ===
The evening he was sworn in, the Justice Department Office of Legal Cousel published a memo indicating Blanche would expand confidentiality to conversations between the president and his private advisers, provided they are related to the job.

On August 16, 2026, in response to a question from Kristen Welker on Meet the Press, Blanche refused to pledge that he would always act independently from the president, adding that "no attorney general should ever pledge that." He stated that Trump would never ask him to do anything unethical or illegal.

== Personal life ==
Blanche met his wife Kristine in college during a summer abroad trip to Australia. They got married in July of 1996 and have two children together, a son named Justin and a daughter named Sydney. In 2023, Blanche and Kristine became grandparents. Since 2008, Blanche's wife Kristine has run her own holistic medical practice. An unlicensed physician, she was appointed to an advisory board for the National Center for Complementary and Integrative Health in April 2026.

== Publications ==
- Blanche, Todd (2001). "When Two Worlds Collide: Examining the Second Circuit's Reasoning in Admitting Evidence of Civil Settlements in Criminal Trials". Brooklyn Law Review. 67 (2): 527–565.

== Works cited ==
- "Questionnaire for Non-Judicial Nominees" (PDF). United States Senate Committee on the Judiciary. February 2025. Archived (PDF) from the original on December 10, 2025.

Legal offices
Preceded by Lisa Monaco	United States Deputy Attorney General; 2025–2026	Succeeded by Trent McCotter; Acting
Preceded by Pam Bondi	United States Attorney General; 2026–present	Incumbent
Government offices
Preceded by Robert Newlen; Acting, Disputed	Librarian of Congress; Acting, Disputed; 2025–present	Incumbent
Order of precedence
Preceded by Pete Hegseth as United States Secretary of Defense	Order of precedence of the United States as Attorney General	Succeeded by Doug Burgum as United States Secretary of the Interior
U.S. presidential line of succession
Preceded by Pete Hegseth as United States Secretary of Defense	Seventh in line as Attorney General	Succeeded by Doug Burgum as United States Secretary of the Interior
