= Librarian of Congress =

Head of the Library of Congress

- Seal of the Library of Congress

- Flag of the Library of Congress
- Incumbent; Disputed (Note: Since Hayden's dismissal by Donald Trump, the role of acting librarian has been disputed between the principal deputy, Newlen, and Trump's named appointee, Blanche.); Robert Newlen (acting) since May 8, 2025; Todd Blanche (acting) since May 12, 2025
- Library of Congress
- Appointer: President of the United States with Senate advice and consent
- Term length: Ten years
- Inaugural holder: John J. Beckley
- Formation: 1800; 226 years ago
- Deputy: Disputed; Vacant (since May 8, 2025); Brian Nieves (acting) (since May 12, 2025)
- Salary: US$203,700; Level II of the Executive Schedule
- Website: loc.gov/librarianoffice/

The librarian of Congress is the head of the Library of Congress, appointed by the president of the United States with the advice and consent of the United States Senate, for a term of ten years. The librarian of Congress also appoints and oversees the register of copyrights of the U.S. Copyright Office and has broad responsibilities around copyright, extending to electronic resources and fair use provisions outlined in the Digital Millennium Copyright Act. The librarian determines whether particular works are subject to DMCA prohibitions regarding technological access protection. In addition, the librarian appoints the U.S. poet laureate and awards the Gershwin Prize for Popular Song.

== History ==
On April 24, 1800, the 6th United States Congress passed and President John Adams signed an appropriations bill that created the Library of Congress. This statute provided "for the removal [from Philadelphia to Washington, D.C.] and accommodation of the Government of the United States". The fifth section of the act created the Library of Congress and designated some of its early functions, including "the acquisition of books for congressional use, a suitable place in the Capitol in which to house them, a joint committee to make rules for their selection, acquisition, and circulation", as well as an appropriation of $5,000 for the new library.

In 1802, two years after the creation of the library, President Thomas Jefferson signed into law a bill that created the Office of the Librarian and granted the president power of appointment for the new office. Shortly thereafter, Jefferson appointed his former campaign manager John J. Beckley to serve as the first librarian of Congress. He was paid $2 a day and was also required to serve as clerk to the House of Representatives. It was not until 1897 that the Senate was given the power to confirm the president's nominee. This same law gave the librarian the sole power for making the institution's rules and appointing the library's staff.

Until the nomination of Herbert Putnam in 1899 under President McKinley, all previous librarians lacked any prior experience in the profession of librarianship; these librarians had held roles in journalism, law, writing, publishing, academia, and politics. Even to this day, only three librarians – four including acting librarian David S. Mao in 2015 – had previously been librarians.

== Appointment, term length, and salary ==
From its creation until 2015, the post of the librarian was not subject to term limits and allowed incumbents to maintain a lifetime appointment once confirmed. Most librarians of Congress have served until death or retirement. There were only 13 librarians of Congress in the more than two centuries from 1802 to 2015, and the library "enjoyed a continuity of atmosphere and of policy that is rare in national institutions". In 2015, Congress passed and President Barack Obama signed into law the "Librarian of Congress Succession Modernization Act of 2015", which put a 10-year term limit on the position with an option for reappointment. The legislation was seen as a critique of Librarian James H. Billington's unwillingness to hire a permanent chief information officer to effectively manage and update the library's information technology.

According to Section 136-1 of Title 2 of the U.S.C., the librarian of Congress shall be appointed to office by a nomination from the president and the advice and consent of the Senate. The librarian may then serve for a term of 10 years and be reappointed to the post with the same procedure. The librarian of Congress shall be compensated for his/her services with the equivalent of the rate of pay set by Level II of the Executive Schedule.

== Qualifications ==
There are no laws or regulations delineating qualifications for the office holder. The position of librarian of Congress has been held by candidates of different backgrounds, interests, and talents, throughout its history. Politicians, businessmen, authors, poets, lawyers, and professional librarians have served as the librarian of Congress. However, at various times there have been proposals for requirements for the position. In 1945, Carl Vitz, then president of the American Library Association, wrote a letter to the president of the United States regarding the position of librarian of Congress, which had recently become vacant. Vitz felt it necessary to recommend potential librarians. Vitz stated the position "requires a top-flight administrator, a statesman-like leader in the world of knowledge, and an expert in bringing together the materials of scholarship and organizing them for use—in short, a distinguished librarian". In 1989, Congressman Major Owens (D–NY) introduced a bill to set stricter requirements for who may be appointed. He argued appointed librarians need to have specialized training; the bill did not become law.

== List of librarians of Congress ==
The following persons have served as the librarian of Congress:

Denotes acting capacity.

No.	Image	Librarian	Start	End	Notes	Nominated by
1		John Beckley (Note: Was also the clerk of the House.)	January 26, 1802	April 8, 1807 (Note: Died in office)		Thomas Jefferson
2		Patrick Magruder	November 6, 1807	January 28, 1815		Thomas Jefferson
3		George Watterston	March 21, 1815	May 28, 1829		James Madison
4		John Meehan	May 28, 1829	May 23, 1861		Andrew Jackson
5		John Stephenson	May 24, 1861	December 31, 1864		Abraham Lincoln
6		Ainsworth Spofford	December 31, 1864	June 30, 1897		Abraham Lincoln
7		John Young	July 1, 1897	January 17, 1899		William McKinley
8		Ainsworth Spofford	January 18, 1899	December 11, 1899		
9		Herbert Putnam	December 12, 1899	October 1, 1939		William McKinley
10		Archibald MacLeish	October 2, 1939	December 19, 1944		Franklin D. Roosevelt
11		Luther Evans	December 19, 1944	June 29, 1945 (Note: Resigned to head UNESCO.)		Harry S. Truman
		Luther Evans	June 30, 1945	July 5, 1953		Harry S. Truman
Acting		Verner Clapp	July 6, 1953	August 30, 1954		
12		Quincy Mumford	September 1, 1954	December 31, 1974		Dwight D. Eisenhower
Acting		John G. Lorenz	January 1, 1975	November 11, 1975		
13		Daniel Boorstin	November 12, 1975	June 15, 1987		Gerald Ford
14		James Billington	September 14, 1987	September 30, 2015		Ronald Reagan
Acting		David Mao	October 1, 2015	September 13, 2016		
15		Carla Hayden	September 14, 2016	May 8, 2025		Barack Obama
Acting; Disputed		Robert Newlen	May 8, 2025	present		
Acting; Disputed		Todd Blanche	May 12, 2025	present		

== Timeline of librarians of Congress ==
Beckley (1802–07)
Magruder (1807–15)
Watterston (1815–29)
Meehan (1829–61)
Stephenson (1861–64)
Spofford (1864–97)
Young (1897–99)
Putnam (1899–1939)
MacLeish (1939–44)
Evans (1945–53)
Mumford (1954–74)
Boorstin (1975–87)
Billington (1987–2015)
Hayden (2016–2025)
│
1802
│
1812
│
1822
│
1832
│
1842
│
1852
│
1862
│
1872
│
1882
│
1892
│
1902
│
1912
│
1922
│
1932
│
1942
│
1952
│
1962
│
1972
│
1982
│
1992
│
2002
│
2012
│
2022
Librarians of Congress (1802–present)
Acting librarian*

== See also ==
- List of librarians
- Parliamentary Librarian of Canada
