= Carla Hayden =

American librarian and 14th Librarian of Congress (born 1952)

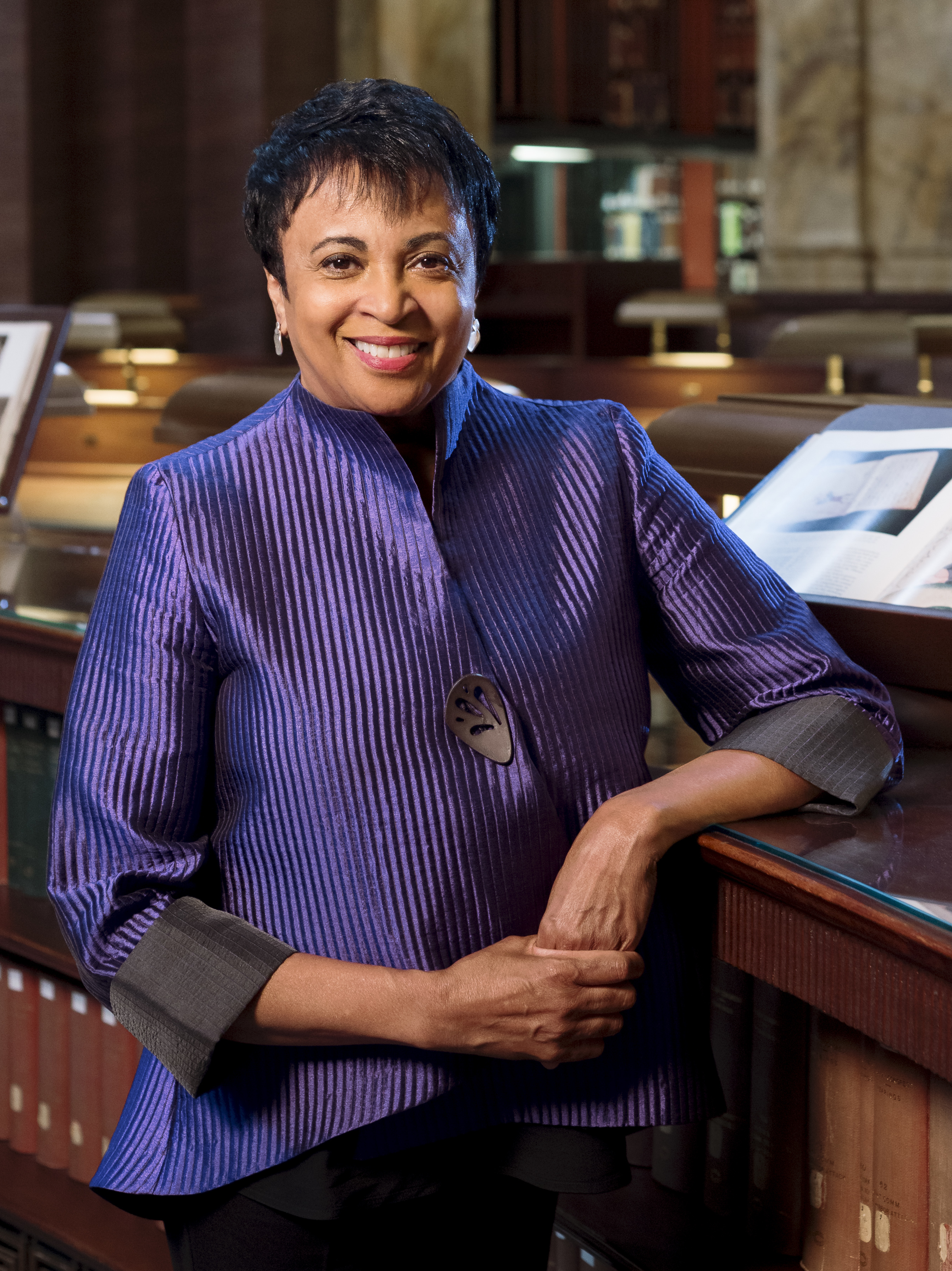
- Official portrait, 2020

14th Librarian of Congress
- In office September 14, 2016 – May 8, 2025
- President: Barack Obama; Donald Trump; Joe Biden; Donald Trump
- Preceded by: David S. Mao (acting)
- Succeeded by: Robert Newlen (acting); Todd Blanche (acting)

President of the American Library Association
- In office 2003–2004
- Preceded by: Maurice J. Freedman
- Succeeded by: Carol A. Brey-Casiano

Personal details
- Born: August 10, 1952 (age 74) Tallahassee, Florida, U.S.
- Education: MacMurray College; Roosevelt University (BA); University of Chicago (MLIS, PhD)

Carla Diane Hayden (born August 10, 1952) is an American librarian who served as the 14th librarian of Congress. Hayden was both the first African American and the first woman to hold this post. Appointed in 2016, she was the first professional librarian to hold the post since 1974. In May 2025, she was dismissed from the post by President Donald Trump. On July 7, 2025, she was appointed senior fellow at the Andrew W. Mellon Foundation.

Hayden began her career at the Chicago Public Library, and earned a Ph.D. in library science from the University of Chicago. From 1993 until 2016, she was the CEO of the Enoch Pratt Free Library in Baltimore, Maryland, and president of the American Library Association (ALA) from 2003 to 2004. During her presidency, she was the leading voice of the ALA in speaking out against provisions of the newly passed United States Patriot Act, which impacted public information services.

In 2020, she was elected to the American Philosophical Society.

== Early life ==
Hayden was born in Tallahassee, Florida, to Bruce Kennard Hayden Jr., at that time director of the String Department at Florida A&M University, and Colleen Hayden (née Dowling), a social worker. Her parents met while attending Millikin University in Decatur, Illinois. Hayden grew up in New York City. When she was 10 years old, her parents divorced and she moved with her mother to Chicago. She had a younger half-brother from her father's second marriage, Bruce Kennard Hayden, III, who died in 1992.

Hayden's mother's side of the family comes from Helena, Arkansas. Her father's maternal side of the family, who eventually settled in Du Quoin, Illinois, had been enslaved, which is chronicled in the book, It's Good to Be Black, by Ruby Berkley Goodwin.

Hayden has said that her passion for reading was inspired by Marguerite de Angeli's Bright April, a 1946 book about a young African-American girl who was in the Brownies. Attending Chicago's South Shore High School, Hayden became interested in books on British history and cozy mysteries. She attended MacMurray College in Jacksonville, Illinois, and then transferred to Roosevelt University.

She did not consider a career in libraries until after she had graduated from Roosevelt University with a degree in political science and African history in 1973. Hayden received her master's degree in library science in 1977, and a doctorate in library science in 1987, both from the University of Chicago Graduate Library School.

== Career ==
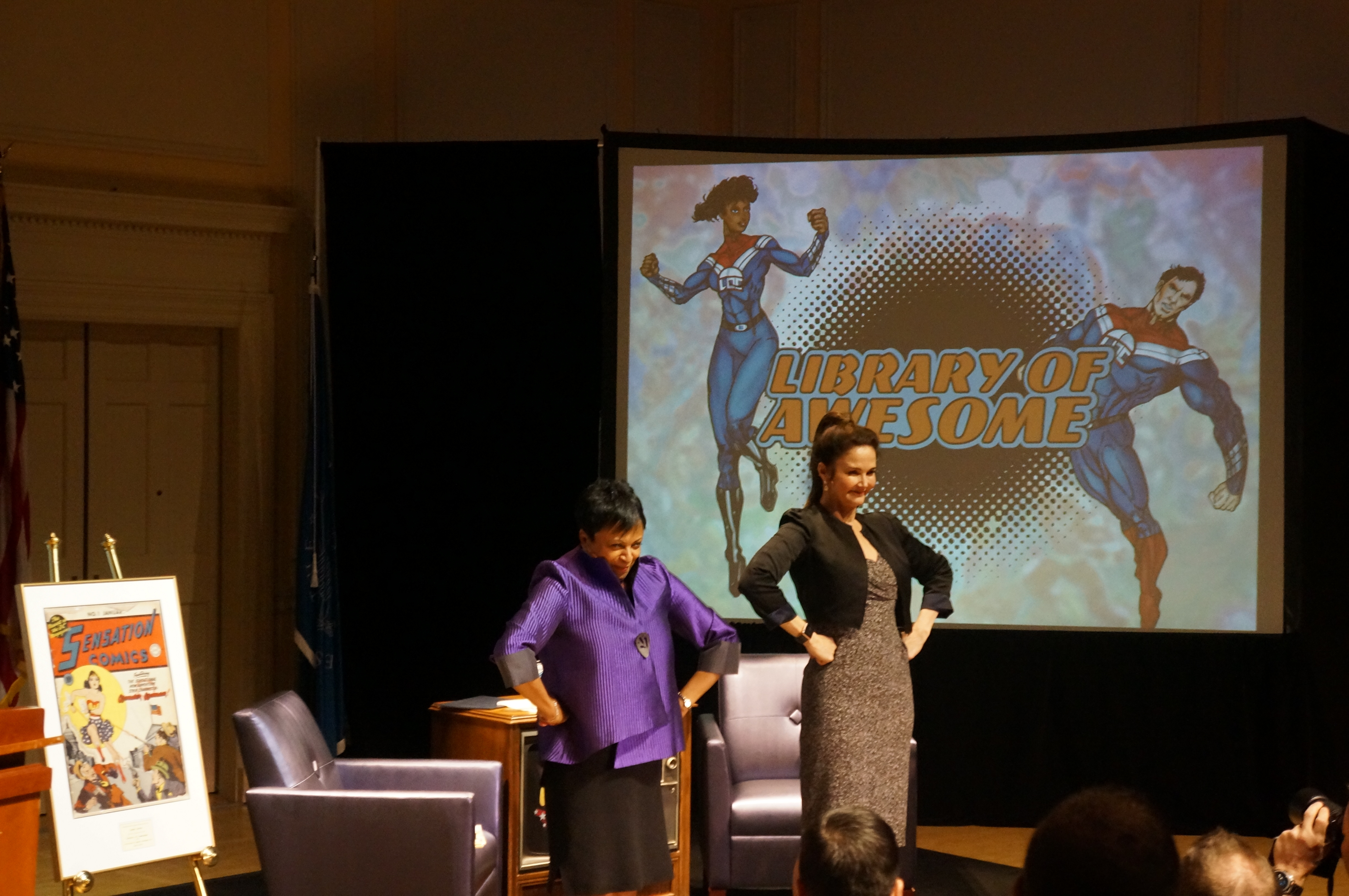
Dr. Hayden (left) and actress Lynda Carter participating in the June 2017 "Library of Awesome" event that celebrated the role of comics and graphic novels in promoting literacy, as they strike the typical pose of Wonder Woman

Hayden began her library career at the Chicago Public Library telling stories to children with autism. From 1973 to 1979, she worked as an associate/children's librarian at the Whitney Young branch. From 1979 to 1982, she served as the young adult services coordinator. From 1982 to 1987, Hayden worked as a library services coordinator at Chicago's Museum of Science and Industry.

Hayden then moved to Pittsburgh and became an associate professor, teaching from 1987 to 1991 at the University of Pittsburgh School of Information Sciences.

Hayden then moved back to Chicago and became Deputy Commissioner and Chief Librarian of the Chicago Public Library, posts she held from 1991 to 1993. During her time working at the Chicago Public Library, Hayden became acquainted with Michelle Obama and Barack Obama.

From 1993 to 2016, Hayden was executive director of Baltimore's Enoch Pratt Free Library.

Prior to and during her ALA presidency, Hayden played a role in influencing the creation of the Spectrum Scholarship Program, which was first developed in 1997 and offers yearly scholarships. This scholarship program seeks to recruit and fund the education of students of color to help them obtain graduate degrees and leadership positions within the field and the ALA.

In January 2010, President Barack Obama announced his intent to nominate Hayden as a member of the National Museum and Library Services Board and National Foundation on the Arts and the Humanities.

== Enoch Pratt Free Library ==
On July 1, 1993, Hayden was appointed director of the Enoch Pratt Free Library, the public library system in Baltimore, Maryland.

During her tenure, Hayden provided outreach services that included "an afterschool center for Baltimore teens offering homework assistance and college and career counseling." Because of this, Hayden received Library Journal's Librarian of the Year Award in 1995. She is the first African American to have received this award. Hayden's period as director included the construction of the Pratt Library's first new branch in more than 30 years, in 2007. During the 2015 Baltimore protests, Hayden kept Baltimore's libraries open, an act for which she received praise. When asked to reflect about this period in a 2016 Time interview she stated that since many stores in the community closed, "we knew that [people] would look for that place of refuge and relief and opportunity."

She left the position on August 11, 2016, when she was appointed to the Library of Congress.

== ALA presidency ==
As president of the American Library Association (ALA) from 2003 to 2004, Hayden chose the theme "Equity of Access". This included a strong focus on outreach programs.

She was also publicly opposed to the Patriot Act, voicing concerns about library user privacy. She especially objected to the special permissions contained in Section 215 of that law, which gave the Department of Justice and the FBI the power to access library user records. Hayden debated publicly with then-Attorney General John Ashcroft over the language of the law.

Ashcroft responded to the ALA's concerns by stating that there are strict legal requirements and that the FBI may only obtain library records that are relevant to existing investigations. Hayden responded that the ALA was "deeply concerned that the Attorney General would be so openly contemptuous" (to the library community), while also pointing out that librarians had been monitored and been under FBI surveillance as far back as the McCarthy Era. Hayden asserted that Ashcroft should release information as to the number of libraries that had been visited under the provisions of Section 215. She has stated that the concern stemmed from making sure that a balance existed "between security and personal freedoms". As a result of this advocacy, she was named Ms. Woman of the Year in 2003.

== Librarian of Congress ==
On February 24, 2016, President Barack Obama nominated Hayden to serve as the next librarian of Congress. More than 140 library, publishing, educational, and academic organizations signed a letter of support.

External videos
- Meet President Obama's Nominee for Librarian of Congress, (3:46), The White House

External videos
- Librarian of Congress Nominee Carla Hayden Confirmation Hearing, (1:01:03), C-SPAN

The nomination was received by the U.S. Senate and referred to the Committee on Rules and Administration. On April 20, 2016, the Committee on Rules and Administration held the confirmation hearing. Hayden opposed the 2000 Children's Internet Protection Act, which was a sticking point in her nomination to become Librarian of Congress.

On July 13, 2016, she was confirmed as Librarian of Congress by a 74–18 vote in the United States Senate. Hayden was sworn in by Chief Justice of the United States John Roberts on September 14, 2016. Hayden is the first woman and the first African American to hold the position. She is also a librarian by profession, whereas many past librarians of Congress have been scholars and historians.

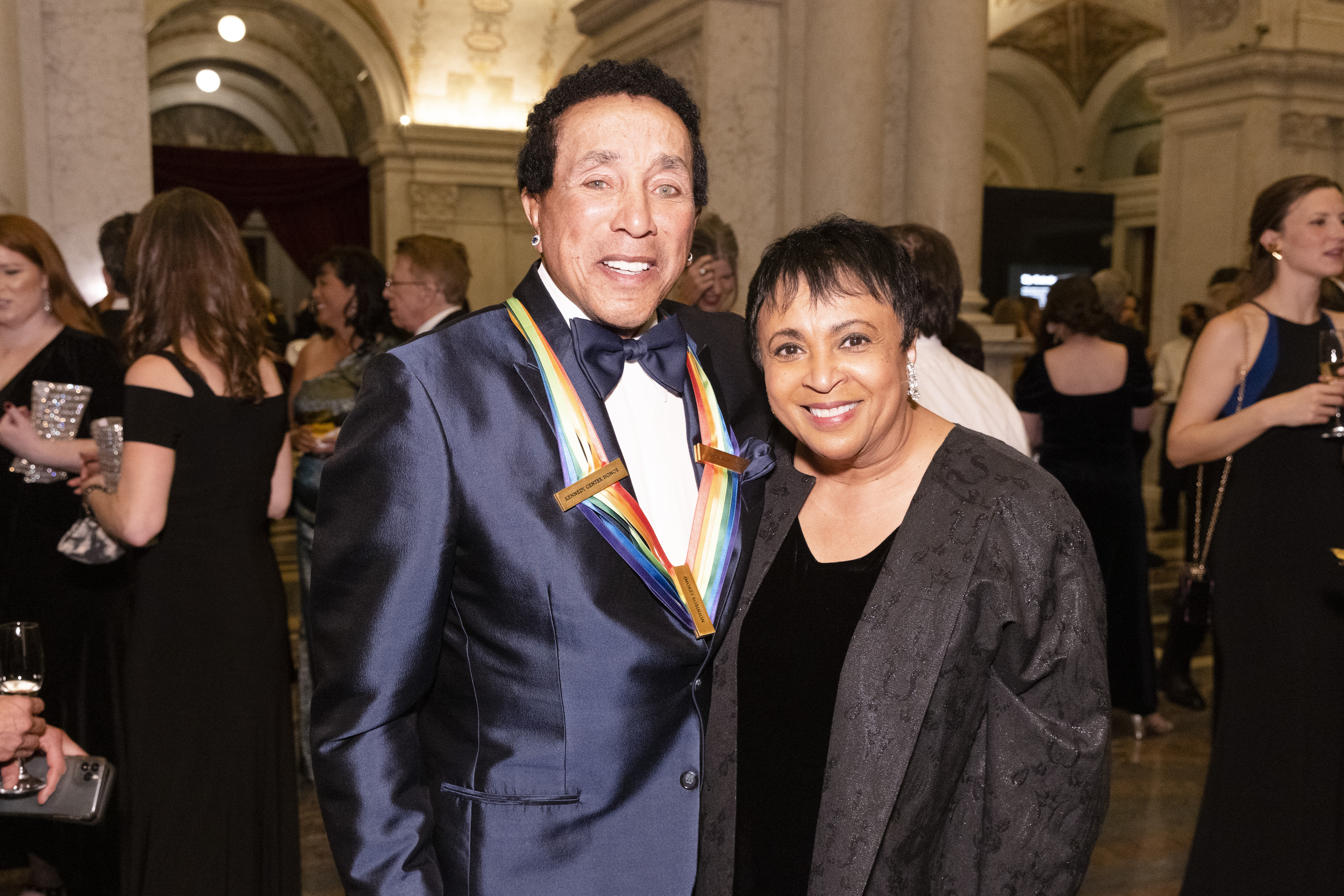
Smokey Robinson and Carla Hayden at the Kennedy Center Honors Medallion Ceremony at the Library of Congress

As librarian of Congress, Hayden said she hoped to continue "the movement to open the treasure chest that is the Library of Congress," and that much of her early effort would focus on building and retaining staff. In the first five years, she also focused on digitization, especially of rare collections.

In January 2017, Hayden hosted four-year-old Daliyah Marie Arana as Librarian of Congress for the day. In October 2017, she hosted eight-year-old Adam Coffey as Librarian of Congress for the day.

=== Termination ===
On May 8, 2025, two days after she testified at the Senate Committee on Appropriations and the Committee on House Administration, Hayden was fired by President Trump via e-mail.

Democratic House minority leader Hakeem Jeffries called the firing "unjust" and part of the "effort to ban books, whitewash American history, and turn back the clock". Representative Rosa DeLauro described Hayden as "a guardian of our nation's truth and intellectual legacy" and said that she had been "abruptly and callously fired", and urged her fellow members of Congress "to stand united in defending the integrity of the Library of Congress".

It was reported that shortly before her dismissal, the American Accountability Foundation (AAF) had posted on X that: "The current #LibrarianOfCongress Carla Hayden is woke, anti-Trump, and promotes trans-ing kids", and she had earlier been targeted by the group with claims she had promoted access to books on "radical gender identity". At the May 9 White House press briefing, Karoline Leavitt said the reason for the firing was:

We felt she did not fit the needs of the American people. There were quite concerning things that she had done at the Library of Congress in the pursuit of DEI and putting inappropriate books in the Library for children, and we don't believe that she was serving the interests of the American taxpayer well, so, she has been removed from her position and the President is well within his rights to do that."

The Association of Research Libraries issued a statement about Hayden's transformational role at the Library of Congress noting, "Over nearly a decade of service, Dr. Hayden transformed the Library of Congress into a more open, accessible, and celebrated U.S. institution, while reaffirming its role as the people's library."

The American Library Association praised the service of Hayden as a "wise and faithful steward of the Library of Congress – the library she has called our 'national treasure'" and its president, Cindy Hohl, decried her "unjust dismissal".

Publishers Weekly characterized Hayden's termination as the "latest blow to professional research and the literary and arts community."

Three U.S. poets laureate—Ada Limón, Joy Harjo, and Tracy K. Smith—condemned her firing. Meg Medina, the 2023-2024 National Ambassador for Children's Literature, said "Dr. Hayden is utterly beloved by her staff and by librarians across this country ... she is nothing short of a national treasure. Her firing is a disgraceful act and one that should concern everyone."

Shortly thereafter, several other officials of the library and its departments were fired as well. The firings have been interpreted as an attack on the separation of powers.

No replacement of Hayden has been nominated. Trump named Deputy Attorney General Todd Blanche as acting librarian of Congress. Principal Deputy Librarian Robert Newlen, who by protocol would have served as interim librarian, was fired. Later, the deputy librarian and copyright office director Shira Perlmutter was fired. Senior DOJ officials Brian Nieves and Paul Perkins were appointed as "acting" for the positions held by Perlmutter and Newlen. Perlmutter has sued to dispute the legality of her dismissal, as her position as Register of Copyrights is appointed by, and responsible to, the librarian of Congress.

On June 8, 2025, Hayden was interviewed on CBS News Sunday Morning about her termination.

== Andrew W. Mellon Foundation ==
Hayden was appointed senior fellow at the Andrew W. Mellon Foundation on July 7, 2025, to advance public knowledge through libraries and archives. The foundation press release noted that Hayden "will pursue scholarship, writing, and research projects while also serving as a strategic partner and counsel."

== PEN/Faulkner Literary Champion ==
Hayden was the 2025 PEN/Faulkner Literary Champion. Gwydion Suilebhan, executive director of the PEN/Faulkner Foundation, stated, "Throughout her impressive career, she has worked tirelessly in service to the belief that American culture thrives when stories from diverse perspectives enrich our lives, ensuring that more and more of us have access to the joys, comforts, and wisdom of fiction. We are thrilled to be able to honor her for her work."

== Honors ==
In 1995, Hayden received the Librarian of the Year Award from Library Journal, becoming the first African American to receive the award.

In 2025, Hayden received the inaugural Jean Blackwell Hutson Award from the Schomburg Center.

- 1995: Library Journal, Librarian of the Year Award
- 1995: Loyola University Maryland, Andrew White Medal
- 1996: National Coalition of 100 Black Women, Torch Bearer Award
- 1996: DuBois Circle of Baltimore, Legacy of Literacy Award
- 1998: Johns Hopkins University, President's Medal
- 2000: University of Baltimore, Doctor of Humane Letters
- 2001: Morgan State University, Doctor of Humane Letters
- 2003: The Daily Record, Maryland's Top 100 Women
- 2003: Ms., Woman of the Year
- 2004: College of Notre Dame of Maryland, Pro Urbe Award
- 2004: YWCA, Leader Award
- 2004: Greater Baltimore Urban League, Whitney M. Young, Jr. Award
- 2005: Barnard College, Medal of Distinction
- 2006: American Library Association, Jean E. Coleman Library Outreach Lecture
- 2007: McDaniel College, Doctor of Humane Letters
- 2013: American Library Association, Joseph W. Lippincott Award
- 2015: American Library Association, Jean E. Coleman Library Outreach Lecture
- 2016: Fortune, The World's 50 Greatest Leaders
- 2017: College of William & Mary, Doctor of Humane Letters
- 2017: American Library Association, Melvil Dewey Medal
- 2017: Women's National Book Association, Centennial Award
- 2017: Hurston/Wright Foundation, North Star Award
- 2017: Time, Firsts List
- 2017: New York Public Library, Library Lion
- 2017: Hutchins Center for African and African American Research, W.E.B. Du Bois Medal
- 2018: American Library Association, Honorary Membership
- 2018: Newberry Library, Newberry Library Award
- 2019: Wake Forest University, Doctor of Humane Letters
- 2019: New York University, Doctor of Humane Letters
- 2019: University of Illinois, Doctor of Humane Letters
- 2019: American Academy of Achievement, Golden Plate Award
- 2022: Columbia University, honorary Doctor of Letters
- 2022: University of Pennsylvania, Doctor of Humane Letters
- 2023: Tufts University, honorary Doctor of Letters
- 2023: American Library Association, Ken Haycock Award for Promoting Librarianship
- 2024: Council for Advancement and Support of Education, Circle of Excellence Award
- 2024: Congressional Black Caucus Foundation, Chair's Award
- 2024: Daughters of the American Revolution, History Award Medal
- 2025. PEN/Faulkner Literary Champion from the PEN/Faulkner Foundation.
- 2025: Schomburg Center, Jean Blackwell Hutson Award
- 2026: Oberlin College, honorary Doctor of Science

== Memberships ==
- 2015–2016: Baltimore Community Foundation, Trustee
- Maryland African American Museum Corporation, board member
- Goucher College, board member
- Franklin and Eleanor Roosevelt Institute Library, board member
- Baltimore City Historical Society, board member
- Baltimore Reads, board member
- Maryland Historical Society, board member
- Greater Baltimore Cultural Alliance, board member
- Open Society Institute-Baltimore, board member
- PALINET, board member
- Sinai Hospital, board member
- University of Pittsburgh School of Information Sciences, board member
- 2007– : Baltimore Gas and Electric, board member
- 2010– : National Museum and Library Services Board, member
- 2010– : National Foundation on the Arts and the Humanities, member
- Baltimore City Combined Charity Campaign, chair
- American Institute of Urban Psychological Studies, board member
- Kennedy Krieger Institute, board member
- YWCA, board member
- Urban Libraries Council, board member

== Publications ==
=== Books ===
- Hayden, Carla Diane, ed. (1992). Venture into Cultures: A Resource Book of Multicultural Materials and Programs (1st ed.). Chicago: American Library Association. ISBN 978-0-8389-0579-1. OCLC 24953316.
- Hayden, Carla Diane (1987). A Frontier of Librarianship: Services for Children in Museums. Chicago: University of Chicago. OCLC 23706364.

=== Book chapters ===
- Hayden, Carla D. (2004). "Foreword". In Osborne, Robin (ed.). From Outreach to Equity: Innovative Models of Library Policy and Practice. Chicago: American Library Association. pp. ix–x. ISBN 978-0-8389-3541-5. OCLC 54685483.
- Hayden, Carla D. (1994). "New approaches to black recruitment". In Josey, Elonnie Junius (ed.). The Black Librarian in America Revisited. Metuchen: Scarecrow Press. pp. 55–64. ISBN 978-0-8108-2830-8. OCLC 29519257.
- Hayden, Carla (1992). "A New Way of Thinking about Librarians". In Schuman, Patricia Glass; Crist, Margo; Curry, Elizabeth (eds.). Your Right to Know: Librarians Make It Happen: Conference Within a Conference Background Papers. Chicago: American Library Association. pp. 34–37. OCLC 30037844. – ALA Annual Conference, Sunday, June 28, 1992, 9 a.m.-5 p.m.

=== Selected articles ===
- Hayden, Carla D. (1985). "Museum of Science and Industry Library". Science & Technology Libraries. 6 (1–2): 47–54. doi:10.1300/J122v06n01_06.
- Hayden, Carla D. (1986). "Literature for and about black adolescents". Illinois Libraries. 68: 372–374.
- Hayden, Carla; Raseroka, Helen Kay (1988). "The Good and the Bad: Two Novels of South Africa". Children's Literature Association Quarterly. 13 (2): 57–60. doi:10.1353/chq.0.0619. S2CID 143395453.
- Hayden, Carla D. (1989). "Multicultural Literature and Library Services for Children: A Continuing Challenge for the New Century". 55th IFLA Council and General Conference Paris, France 19-26 August 1989. The Hague (Netherlands): IFLA General Conference. pp. 2–4. OCLC 438720810.
- Hayden, C. D. (1991). Children and Computer Technology in American Libraries. Books by African-American authors and illustrators for children and young adults, 14.
- Hayden, C. D. (2003). ALA reaffirms core values, commitment to members. Newsletter On Intellectual Freedom, 52(6), 219.
- Hayden, C. D. (2003). Equity of Access—the Time Is Now. American Libraries, 34(7), 5.
- Hayden, C. D. (2003). ALA President's Message: Something for Everyone@ Your Library. American Libraries, 5–5.
- Hayden, C. D. (2003). ALA President's Message: What Are Libraries For?. American Libraries, 5–5.
- Hayden, C. D. (2004). ALA President's statement to Judiciary Committee. Newsletter On Intellectual Freedom, 53(1), 1–35.
- Hayden, C. D. (2004). ALA President's Message: The Equity Struggle Must Continue. American Libraries, 5–5.
- Hayden, C. D. (2004). ALA President's Message: Libraries Matter Because People Believe in Them. American Libraries, 35(1), 5–5.
- Hayden, C. D. (2004). ALA President's Message: Advocacy from the Outside and from Within. American Libraries, 35(2), 5–5.
- Hayden, C. D. (2004). ALA President's Message: Reaching Out to the Underserved. American Libraries, 35(3), 5–5.
- Hayden, C. D. (2004). ALA President's Message: Building accessibility for all. American Libraries, 35(4), 5–5.
- Hayden, C. D. (2008). Free Is Our Middle Name. Unabashed Librarian, (146), 10–11.

=== Thesis/dissertation ===
- Waters, Carla Diane Hayden (1977). A Public Library Program for the Parent and Preschool Child. Chicago, IL: University of Chicago. OCLC 6178030.

Non-profit organization positions
Preceded by Maurice J. Freedman	President of the American Library Association; 2003–2004	Succeeded by Carol A. Brey-Casiano
Government offices
Preceded by David S. Mao; Acting	Librarian of Congress; 2016–2025	Succeeded by Robert Newlen; Acting, Disputed
