= List of George Washington University Law School alumni =

This is a list of notable alumni of The George Washington University Law School located in Washington, D.C., U.S.

== Notable alumni ==
Class of 1891

=== Academia ===
- Ernest L. Wilkinson (1926), former President of Brigham Young University
- Virág Blazsek, associate professor at the University of Leeds School of Law
- Bilguun Adiya, Lecturer in Law at the School of Law of the University of Finance and Economics (Mongolia)

=== Business ===
- Mark Britton (1992), founder and CEO of Avvo (now Martindale-Avvo), and former Executive Vice President and General Counsel at Expedia, Inc.
- Warren Brown (1998), founder of Cake Love and host of Sugar Rush on the Food Network
- Dan Glickman (1969), former chairman and CEO of the Motion Picture Association of America, former United States Secretary of Agriculture, and former U.S. Congressman from Kansas
- Charles James (1979), former General Counsel of Chevron-Texaco, former Assistant Attorney General
- Michael W. Rice, chairman and CEO of Utz Quality Foods
- D. Bruce Sewell (1986), Senior Vice President and General Counsel of Apple, Inc. and former vice president and Deputy General Counsel at Intel
- Brainard Warner (1869), Washington, D.C., businessman and developer

==== Sports ====
- David Falk (1975), agent for Michael Jordan
- Ted Lerner (1950), owner of the Washington Nationals
- Larry MacPhail (1910), Hall of Fame baseball executive for Cincinnati Reds, Brooklyn Dodgers and New York Yankees

=== Government and politics ===
- Steve Castor minority counsel for the impeachment of Donald Trump

==== U.S. Congress members ====
- E. Ross Adair, U.S. Representative from Indiana (1951–1971) and U.S. Ambassador to Ethiopia (1971–1974)
- Garry E. Brown (1954), former U.S. Congressman from Michigan
- Gordon Canfield (1926), former U.S. Congressman from New Jersey
- Bennett Champ Clark, former United States Senator
- William Henry Coleman, former U.S. Congressman from Pennsylvania
- John Blaisdell Corliss (1875), former United States Congressman
- Félix Córdova Dávila, former Resident Commissioner of Puerto Rico from Puerto Rico
- Ewin L. Davis (1899), former U.S. Congressman from Tennessee
- John James Duncan Jr. (1973), United States Congressman for the Second District of Tennessee
- John James Flynt Jr. (1940), United States Congressman from Georgia
- J. William Fulbright (1934), former United States Senator, creator of the Fulbright Fellowships
- Ralph A. Gamble (1911), former U.S. Congressman from New York
- Stephen Warfield Gambrill (1896), former United States Congressman
- Ernest W. Gibson Jr., former Governor of Vermont, U.S. Senator, judge for the U.S. District Court for the District of Vermont
- Orval H. Hansen (1954) (LLM 1973), former U.S. Congressman from Idaho
- Daniel Inouye (1953), former United States Senator (D-HI)
- Frank Moss (1937), former United States Senator (D-UT)
- Francis G. Newlands (1869), congressman and drafter of the Newlands Resolution to annex the Republic of Hawaiʻi
- Pedro Pierluisi (1984), current Governor of Puerto Rico and former Resident Commissioner of Puerto Rico of Puerto Rico
- Jim Ramstad (1973), congressman whose work led to ending discrimination against those suffering from mental health and addiction problems
- Harry Reid (1964), United States Senator, former Senate Minority Leader (D-NV)
- James Shannon, former U.S. Congressman and Massachusetts Attorney General
- Robert Wexler (1985), congressman (D-FL)
- Susan Wild, U.S. Congresswoman from Pennsylvania
- Earle D. Willey, former U.S. Congressman from Delaware

==== Other federal officials ====
- William Barr (1977), former United States Attorney General
- David Bernhardt (1994), former United States Secretary of the Interior
- A. Bruce Bielaski (1904), second director of the Bureau of Investigation
- Floyd I. Clarke, former director of the Federal Bureau of Investigation
- Kellyanne Conway (1992), Political strategist and pollster, Campaign Manager for Donald Trump's 2016 presidential campaign, Counselor to the President
- George B. Cortelyou, cabinet member in the Theodore Roosevelt administration
- Makan Delrahim, United States Assistant Attorney General
- Mary DeRosa (1984), former Deputy Counsel to the President for National Security Affairs in the Obama Administration
- Allen Dulles (1926), longest serving (1953–61) director of the CIA
- John Foster Dulles, Secretary of State in the Dwight D. Eisenhower administration
- W. Mark Felt (1940), former associate director of the FBI and Watergate scandal informant also known as "Deep Throat"
- Stanley Finch (1908), first director of the Bureau of Investigation
- Gregory G. Garre (1991), former Solicitor General of the United States
- L. Patrick Gray, former acting director of the FBI during the Watergate scandal
- Will A. Gunn, sworn in as the General Counsel for the Department of Veterans Affairs on May 26, 2009
- Kenneth R. Harding (1937), former Sergeant at Arms of the United States House of Representatives (1972–1980)
- Patricia Roberts Harris (1960), first African American woman to serve in the United States Cabinet as Secretary of Housing and Urban Development, in the Jimmy Carter administration
- John D. Holum, Director of the U.S. Arms Control and Disarmament Agency and Under Secretary of State for Arms Control and International Security under Bill Clinton
- J. Edgar Hoover (1917), longtime director of the Federal Bureau of Investigation
- Edward F. Howrey (1927), chair of the Federal Trade Commission, later founded the law firm of Howrey LLP
- Leon Jaworski (1926), special prosecutor during the Watergate scandal
- David M. Kennedy, former United States Secretary of the Treasury
- Bruce M. Lawlor, retired United States Army major general and former chief of staff at the Department of Homeland Security
- Wilma B. Liebman (1974), Chair, National Labor Relations Board
- Darryl Nirenberg (1981), U.S. ambassador to Romania
- Walter North, U.S. ambassador to Papua New Guinea, Solomon Islands, and Vanuatu
- Eric O'Neill (2003), FBI agent whose work led to the arrest and life imprisonment conviction of Robert Hanssen
- Maria Pallante (1990), current U.S. Register of Copyrights
- Marybeth Peters (1971), former U.S. Register of Copyrights
- Mary Schapiro (1980), Chair of the Securities and Exchange Commission; first woman to chair the SEC
- John W. Snow (1967), former United States Secretary of the Treasury
- Russell Vought, current Director of the Office of Management and Budget
- James E. Webb (1936), second administrator of NASA
- James A. Wetmore (1896), acting Supervising Architect of the Office of the Supervising Architect

==== State and local government ====
- Rocky Anderson (1978), former mayor of Salt Lake City
- Edward Blackmon Jr. (1973), Mississippi House of Representatives
- James P. Coleman (1939), former Governor of Mississippi and chief judge on the U.S. Court of Appeals for the Fifth Circuit
- Lee E. Emerson, Governor of Vermont, 1951–1955
- Philip Ensler, member of the Alabama House of Representatives
- John W. Hardwicke, Maryland delegate and lawyer
- Regina "Gina" Hinojosa (1999), governor of the state of Texas
- Harry R. Hughes (1952), former governor of the state of Maryland
- Rod Johnston, former Wisconsin State Senator
- Alex Knopp (1981), former mayor of Norwalk, Connecticut
- Deanne Mazzochi, Illinois House of Representatives
- Edward S. Northrop (1937), Majority Leader of Maryland State Senate (1958–1961), Chair of the Finance Committee (1958), nominated by President Kennedy in 1961 for a new seat on the United States District Court for the District of Maryland, elevated to Chief Judge and held that position until 1981
- Carmen Ortiz (1981), first woman and the first Hispanic to serve as United States Attorney for the District of Massachusetts
- Arnold C. Otto, former Wisconsin State Assemblyman
- Jeffrey Piccola (1973), Pennsylvania State Representative, 1977–1995, Pennsylvania State Senator, 1995–2012
- Grant Sawyer, former Governor of Nevada
- Joshua Soule Zimmerman, West Virginia House Delegate

==== International ====
- Árpád Bogsch (1956), former director general (1973–1997) of the World Intellectual Property Organization
- Camillo Gonsalves, Permanent Representative of Saint Vincent and the Grenadines to the United Nations
- Hsu Mo (1922), former International Court of Justice judge
- Somanahalli Mallaiah Krishna, Foreign Minister of India, former Chief Minister of Karnataka
- Yasmine Pahlavi, Crown Princess of Iran
- Mikheil Saakashvili (1996), President of Georgia
- Anja Seibert-Fohr (2000, 2004), judge at the European Court of Human Rights

=== Judiciary ===
==== Federal ====
- Craig S. Atkins (1925), judge of the United States Tax Court
- James C. Cacheris (1960), judge U.S. District Court for the Eastern District of Virginia
- Darrin P. Gayles (1993), judge U.S. District Court for the Southern District of Florida
- Joyce Hens Green (1951), senior judge U.S. District Court for the District of Columbia
- Harold H. Greene (1954), former judge U.S. District Court for the District of Columbia, presided over lawsuit which broke up AT&T's vertical monopoly
- Kelly Higashi, associate judge on the Superior Court of the District of Columbia
- Christopher De Bono, associate judge on the Superior Court of the District of Columbia
- Sarah T. Hughes (1922), first female federal judge seated in Texas, and only woman to administer the oath of office to the President of the United States
- Edwin F. Hunter (1938), longest sitting U.S. District Court judge in the nation
- Daniel T. K. Hurley (1968), judge U.S. District Court for the Southern District of Florida
- Barbara Milano Keenan (1974), judge U.S. Court of Appeals for the Fourth Circuit
- Carlos F. Lucero (1964), judge U.S. Court of Appeals for the Tenth Circuit
- Burnita Shelton Matthews (1920), first woman to serve as a US district judge U.S. District Court for the District of Columbia
- Suzanne Mitchell, United States magistrate judge for the Western District of Oklahoma and a former nominee to be a United States district judge of the United States District Court for the Western District of Oklahoma
- Sharon Prost (LLM 1984), judge United States Court of Appeals for the Federal Circuit
- Randall Ray Rader (1978), judge United States Court of Appeals for the Federal Circuit
- Kenneth Francis Ripple (1972), judge U.S. Court of Appeals for the Seventh Circuit
- James Robertson (1965), judge U.S. District Court for the District of Columbia, presided over Hamdan v. Rumsfeld
- William K. Sessions III (1972), chief judge U.S. District Court for the District of Vermont and Vice Chair of the United States Sentencing Commission
- Scott W. Stucky (LLM 1983), judge United States Court of Appeals for the Armed Forces
- Bolon B. Turner (LLM 1924), judge United States Tax Court

==== State ====
- Joseph F. Baca (1964), Chief Justice of the New Mexico Supreme Court
- Albert T. Blackwell Jr., Justice of the Maryland Court of Appeals
- Carmen E. Espinosa (1976), First Hispanic judge for the Connecticut Superior Court, Connecticut Appellate Court, and the Connecticut Supreme Court
- R. C. McDonough (1949), Justice of the Montana Supreme Court
- George B. Nelson (1902), Justice of the Wisconsin Supreme Court
- Gregory K. Orme (1978), Judge Utah Court of Appeals
- Barbara Pariente (1973), current Chief Justice of the Florida Supreme Court
- Leslie Perkins Snow (1891), Justice of the New Hampshire Supreme Court

=== Lawyers ===
- Michael Avenatti (1999), lawyer who filed a lawsuit on behalf of Stormy Daniels seeking to invalidate a 2016 "hush" agreement regarding an alleged affair with Donald Trump
- Ian C. Ballon (1986), Internet lawyer and author of several law books, including a 4-volume legal treatise on e-commerce law
- Jacob Burns (1924), corporate attorney, educator and philanthropist
- Charles Colson, leader in the Christian right movement, former Special Counsel to Richard Nixon, and jailed for conspiring during the Watergate scandal
- Denise Tourover Ezekiel (1924), lawyer who served in various executive positions for Hadassah, the Women's Zionist Organization of America
- Roy Den Hollander, men's rights lawyer who became the main suspect in the fatal attack on Judge Esther Salas' family
- Francis La Flesche, first professional Native American (Omaha) anthropologist
- Prerna Lal, immigration attorney
- Belva Ann Lockwood (1872), first woman to argue before the United States Supreme Court
- Frank Neuhauser (1940), patent attorney and winner of the first National Spelling Bee in 1925
- Vipal J. Patel, acting Attorney of the Southern District of Ohio
- Charles S. Rhyne (1912-2003), lawyer who argued landmark case Baker v. Carr
- Jonathan Schwartz, film producer, entertainment lawyer
- M. Gerald Schwartzbach (1969), California criminal defense attorney
- Harry Aubrey Toulmin Sr. (1882), patent attorney to the Wright Brothers
- Nathan Hale Williams, film and television producer, entertainment lawyer
- Aaron Gideon Parnas, lawyer, political strategist, and digital journalist

=== Media ===
- Margaret Carlson, journalist; columnist for Bloomberg News
- Mona Charen, political analyst and best-selling author
- David Eisenhower (1976), author and grandson of Dwight D. Eisenhower
- Michael Kinsley, political commentator and journalist, former co-host of CNN's Crossfire
- Matt Medved, journalist; editor-in-chief of Spin

=== Military ===
- Earl E. Anderson, Ret. general, United States Marine Corps
- Richard A. Appelbaum, Ret. U.S. Coast Guard rear admiral
- Vaughn Ary, Staff Judge Advocate to the Commandant of the United States Marine Corps
- Jedediah Hyde Baxter, son of Portus Baxter and Surgeon General of the United States Army
- Murdock A. Campbell (1919), United States Army major general and adjutant general of the Vermont National Guard
- John Fugh (1960), former Judge Advocate General
- Wilfred A. Hearn, former Judge Advocate General
- James F. Lawrence Jr. (1953), first Marine lawyer to be promoted to brigadier general, Navy Cross recipient
- Sidney A. Wallace, retired United States Coast Guard rear admiral

=== Religion ===
- Charles Colson (1959), former White House Counsel, born-again Christian, and founder of Prison Fellowship
- Matthew Cowley (1925), former Apostle of the Church of Jesus Christ of Latter-day Saints
- Brooks Hays (1922), United States Congressman (D-AR) and President of the Southern Baptist Convention
