= Perlmutter =

Perlmutter is a German and Ashkenazi Jewish surname which means "mother-of-pearl". It may refer to:

- Adele Perlmutter (1845–1941), Austrian photographer
- Alvin H. Perlmutter, television producer
- David Perlmutter (born 1954), American physician and author
- David M. Perlmutter (born 1938), American linguist
- Ed Perlmutter (born 1953), US Congressman from Colorado
- Hayyim Perlmutter (fl. 18th century), Russian rabbi
- Inbal Perlmutter (1971–1997), Israeli musician
- Isaac Perlmutter (born 1942), American businessman and financier
- Jess Perlmutter (born 2009), American snowboarder
- Jordon Perlmutter (1931–2011), American real estate developer
- Richard Perlmutter, songwriter, singer and producer
- Roger Perlmutter, Merck research leader and scientist
- Saul Perlmutter (born 1959), Nobel laureate astrophysicist at Lawrence Berkeley National Laboratory
- Shira Perlmutter (born 1956), 14th and incumbent US Register of Copyrights
