= Valancourt Books v. Garland =

2023 United States appeals court case

- Court: United States Court of Appeals for the District of Columbia Circuit
- Full case name: Valancourt Books, LLC v. Merrick B. Garland, Attorney General and Shira Perlmutter, in her official capacity as the Register of Copyrights of the U.S. Copyright Office
- Argued: October 13 2022
- Decided: August 29 2023
- Citation: 82 F.4th 1222 (D.C. Cir. 2023)

Court membership
- Judges sitting: Sri Srinivasan, Karen L. Henderson, Harry T. Edwards

Case opinions
- Majority: Srinivasan, joined by Henderson, Edwards

Laws applied
- Takings Clause

Valancourt Books v. Garland was a lawsuit in the United States Court of Appeals for the District of Columbia Circuit that in 2023 found that mandatory deposit of books at the United States Library of Congress was in violation of the Takings Clause of the Fifth Amendment.

== Background ==
Valancourt Books is a print-on-demand independent publishing house specializing in rare and out-of-print books. Valancourt had not registered its books for copyright as the Library of Congress already had original-edition copies of the books Valancourt republishes and any new material in its publications was limited to notes and introductions.

In 2018, the company was sent a letter from the United States Copyright Office seeking deposit copies for 341 books published by Valancourt. Specifically, the Copyright Office requested two copies of the "best edition" of each book published by Valancourt under Section 407 of Title 17 of the U.S. Code. Valancourt responded by stating that printing the requested books would be unaffordable and that they could not comply with the request. When the Copyright Office reiterated its request for deposit copies and threatened fines totaling approximately $80,000, Valancourt sued Merrick Garland (the U.S. Attorney General) and Shira Perlmutter (the Register of Copyrights). The suit was brought under view that the requirement to submit deposit copies violated the Takings Clause by taking copies of the books without fair compensation, and separately that Section 407 violated the First Amendment by putting a tax on publishing books via fines.

During litigation in 2019, the Copyright Office stated that it would accept electronic copies of in lieu of physical copies as part of a settlement offer, but the offer was rejected by Valancourt. In 2021, the U.S. District Court for the District of Columbia granted summary judgment in favor of the U.S. Government on both the First and Fifth Amendment claims, specifically holding that Section 407 is constitutional as a voluntary exchange for federal copyright protection. The district court noted that Valancourt was voluntarily and knowingly benefiting from copyright law by including copyright notices despite not registering its copyrights. Valancourt appealed the decision shortly after judgment.

== Findings ==
The United States Court of Appeals for the District of Columbia Circuit reversed the district court's ruling, determining that the mandatory deposit requirement of Section 407 of the Copyright Act of 1976 was an unconstitutional government taking of Valancourt's property in violation of the Takings Clause. Specifically, copyright owners were found to not receive any "additional benefits" from depositing the copies in accordance with Section 407 because a work receives copyright protection automatically when it is created and that a copyright holder would retain the copyright regardless of whether the fines are paid or not.

The court distinguished the mandatory deposit requirement of Section 407 (which was found to grant no benefits to copyright holders) with the voluntary deposit requirement of Section 408 (which grants copyright holders additional government benefits such as the ability to sue for copyright infringement). However, Section 408 relates only to copyright holders applying for a copyright registration, whereas Section 407 is broadly applicable to all copyright holders. The court also left open the possibility that Section 407 was constitutional in other circumstances, such as permitting deposit of electronic copies. The opinion did not address Valancourt's First Amendment concerns due to the application of the Takings Clause.

A consideration brought up during arguments related to copyright abandonment. No mention was made of the possibility of abandonment in the initial letter sent to Valancourt, and the Copyright Office only mentioned abandonment as an option during the oral arguments. Valancourt argued that abandonment is not explicitly mentioned in the copyright law, and that the Copyright Office does not guarantee any legal effectiveness of copyright abandonment. The Copyright Office argued that Valancourt could have avoided the mandatory deposit requirement by surrendering its copyright protection, but this was rejected by the court because of the lack of a simple and transparent way to opt out of copyright protection. As part of the final decision, the circuit court reserved the question whether a simple and costless abandonment option would make Section 407 constitutional.

== Aftermath ==
The court declined the Department of Justice's petition to rehear the case en banc. The Department of Justice then declined to appeal the case to the United States Supreme Court, stating that, despite disagreeing with the court's ruling, the effect and significance of the decision was limited.

The Copyright Office has stated that it would modify the language of its deposit demand letters and withdraw its demand for copies if the Copyright Office was notified of the copyright's abandonment.

Several legislative changes have been proposed to address all elements of the case: changes to Section 407 to tie some legal benefit to the deposit, monetary compensation to copyright holders for depositing books, and regulation for a simple and costless method of copyright abandonment.
