= Clement Lincoln Bouvé =

American politician (1878–1944)

Clement Bouvé
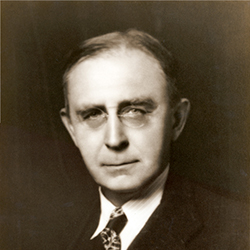

Register of Copyrights
- In office August 1, 1936 – December 31, 1943
- Preceded by: William Lincoln Brown
- Succeeded by: Richard Crosby De Wolf (acting)

Personal details
- Born: Clement Lincoln Bouvé; May 27, 1878 Hingham, Massachusetts
- Died: January 14, 1944 (aged 65)
- Resting place: Arlington National Cemetery
- Spouse: Mary McLean
- Education: Harvard University (BA, JD)

Military service
- Branch/service: U.S. Army
- Rank: Lieutenant Colonel

Clement Lincoln Bouvé (May 27, 1878 – January 14, 1944) was the third Register of Copyrights in the United States Copyright Office. He was the first lawyer to serve as Register, and his administration of the Office was marked by attention to the formalities of United States copyright law, including the creation of a legal staff, the establishment of an Examining Section, and the formation of a Revisory Board.

Bouvé was born May 27, 1878, in Hingham, Massachusetts, and educated at Harvard College and the Harvard Law School. Prior to becoming Register, he worked as Assistant United States District Attorney for Manila, the Panamanian Commission, and as an agent of the United States before the General and Special Claims Commission during boundary discussions with Mexico. He served in the Field Artillery in France during World War I and in the Army of Occupation in Germany, and retired from the United States Army with the rank of Lieutenant colonel. In 1912, Bouvé authored "A Treatise on the Laws Governing the Exclusion and Expulsion of Aliens in the United States," considered to be one of the first authoritative legal works on the subject.

Bouvé was appointed as Register of Copyrights on August 1, 1936. He presided over the Office during its move in 1939 from the south side of the ground floor of the Thomas Jefferson Building to the newly built John Adams Building. He created the Copyright Card Catalog, 1938–1945, the first Copyright Office catalog combining all registration entries, and wrote a 72-page document titled "Letter to the Librarian of Congress concerning Certain Aspects of the Copyright Act of March 4, 1909, in their Relation to the Public Interest and Existing Problems of Copyright Office Administration, with Proposed Amendments."

Bouvé was in ill health when he retired on December 31, 1943. He died weeks later, on January 14, 1944, and was buried in Arlington National Cemetery.

Government offices
Preceded by William Lincoln Brown	Register of Copyrights; 1936–1943	Succeeded by Richard Crosby De Wolf; Acting
