= Richard Crosby De Wolf =

American Register of Copyrights

Richard De Wolf
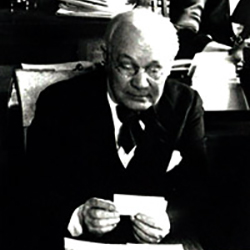

Register of Copyrights
- Acting
- In office January 1, 1944 – February 1, 1945
- Preceded by: Clement Lincoln Bouvé
- Succeeded by: Sam Bass Warner

Personal details
- Born: Richard Crosby De Wolf; 1875 Des Moines, Iowa, U.S.
- Died: March 8, 1947 (aged 71–72) St. Augustine, Florida, U.S.
- Education: Massachusetts Institute of Technology; George Washington University (LLB)

Military service
- Branch/service: United States Marine Corps

Richard Crosby De Wolf (1875–1947) was acting Register of Copyrights from 1944 to 1945 and one of the first United States copyright law scholars to suggest a completely disjunctive reading of the Copyright Clause.

De Wolf was born in Des Moines, Iowa in 1875. He attended Massachusetts Institute of Technology for two years before joining the U.S. Marines in 1899 and fighting in the Spanish–American War. He first started working for the United States Copyright Office in 1907. In 1913 he received his L.L.B. from George Washington University Law School, eventually leaving the Copyright Office in 1918 to practice law privately.

De Wolf worked for the Copyright Office on and off for the next several decades until being appointed acting Register of Copyrights on January 1, 1945, to replace Clement Lincoln Bouvé. He served in that capacity until February 1, 1945, when Sam Bass Warner was appointed the fourth Register of Copyrights. De Wolf died on March 8, 1947, and is buried in St. Augustine, Florida.

Richard Crosby De Wolf is noted for being one of the earliest teachers of copyright law as a separate subject in the United States.

De Wolf is also noted as one of the earliest scholars to suggest a completely disjunctive reading of the Copyright Clause. The Clause, which gives Congress the power to grant both copyrights and patents, states

The Congress shall have Power ... To promote the Progress of Science and useful Arts, by securing for limited Times to Authors and Inventors the exclusive Right to their respective Writings and Discoveries.

De Wolf wrote in his book "An Outline of Copyright Law" that one could resolve this statement disjunctively, illustrating the separate grants of authority for copyrights and patents, so that it states "(1) The progress of science is to be promoted by securing to authors the right to their writings; and (2) the progress of useful arts is to be promoted by securing to inventors the right to their discoveries." The Supreme Court endorsed this view in 1966 in Graham v. John Deere Co., citing "An Outline of Copyright Law."

Government offices
Preceded by Clement Lincoln Bouvé	Register of Copyrights; Acting; 1944–1945	Succeeded by Sam Bass Warner
