= Sam Bass Warner =

American lawyer

Sam Warner
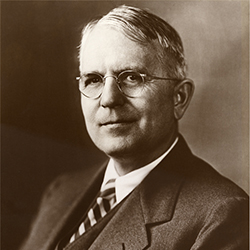

Register of Copyrights
- In office February 1, 1945 – May 28, 1951
- Preceded by: Richard Crosby De Wolf (acting)
- Succeeded by: Arthur Fisher

Personal details
- Born: Sam Bass Warner; 1889 Chicago, Illinois, U.S.
- Died: April 23, 1979 (aged 89–90) Guilford, Connecticut, U.S.
- Education: Harvard University (BA, JD)

Military service
- Branch/service: United States Army

Sam Bass Warner (1889–1979) was the fourth Register of Copyrights in the United States Copyright Office.

Born Sam Perkins Fiske in Chicago, Illinois, May 27, 1889, he was the first son of Asian art collector and female museum specialist Gertrude Bass Warner and George F. Fiske. Following their divorce and his mother's marriage to Murray Warner, Warner would take his stepfather's surname and, like Murray, attended Phillips Exeter Academy. Warner traveled extensively throughout Asian with his parents and, as an amateur photographer, he took many of the turn-of-the-century lantern slide photographs now housed in the University of Oregon Knight Library Special Collections & University Archives. Later, Warner attended Harvard College and Harvard Law School. Prior to entering the Copyright Office, he specialized in criminal law, writing several books and articles and teaching at the University of Oregon Law School, Syracuse Law School, and Harvard Law School. Warner was enlisted in the United States Army, serving in World War I as an aerial observer and later as an attorney in the War Production Board during World War II.

Warner served as Register of Copyrights from February 1, 1945 until May 28, 1951. During his tenure, he oversaw many improvements in the Office and its registration procedures. Most notably, he reorganized the many disparate units of the Office into four divisions – Cataloging, Examining, Reference, and Service.

Sam Bass Warner died on April 23, 1979, in Guilford, Connecticut.

== Bibliography ==
- Sam Bass Warner; Henry Bromfield Cabot (1936), Judges and Law Reform, ISBN 0-405-06179-X

Government offices
| Preceded by Richard Crosby De Wolf; Acting | Register of Copyrights; 1945–1951 | Succeeded by Arthur Fisher |
