= Barbara Ringer =

United States Register of Copyright

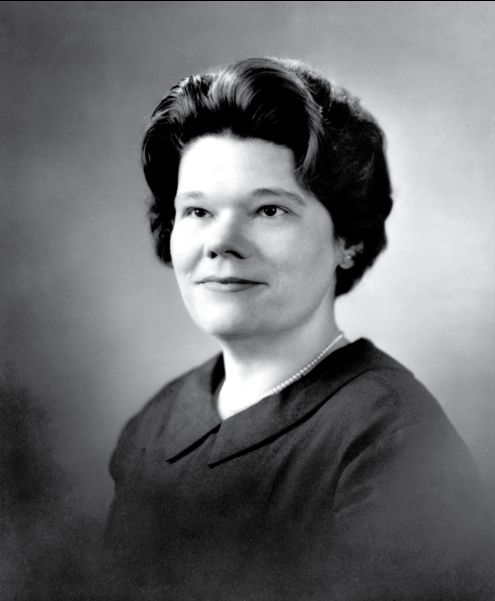

Register of Copyrights
- In office November 27, 1993 – August 6, 1994; Acting
- Preceded by: Ralph Oman
- Succeeded by: Marybeth Peters
- In office November 19, 1973 – May 30, 1980
- Preceded by: Abe Goldman (acting)
- Succeeded by: David Ladd

Personal details
- Born: May 29, 1925 Lafayette, Indiana, U.S.
- Died: April 9, 2009 (aged 83) Lexington, Virginia, U.S.
- Education: George Washington University (BA, MA); Columbia University (JD)
- Awards: President's Award for Distinguished Federal Civilian Service (1977)

Barbara Ringer (May 29, 1925 – April 9, 2009) was one of the lead architects of the 1976 Copyright Act. She spent much of her career lobbying Congress and drafting legislation that overhauled the 1909 Copyright Act. Ringer was also the first woman to serve as the Register of Copyrights in the United States Copyright Office. During her three decades with the United States Copyright Office, Ringer gained a reputation as an authority on copyright law.

== Early life ==
Barbara Alice Ringer was born in Lafayette, Indiana on May 29, 1925. Her mother was the only woman in the University of Michigan School of Law Class of 1923. Both of Ringer's parents worked as government lawyers.

She was a Phi Beta Kappa graduate of George Washington University in 1945, and received her master of arts degree from George Washington in 1947. Ringer graduated from Columbia Law School in 1949, where she was one of only a few women in her class. Ringer joined the Copyright Office as an examiner after graduating.

== Career ==
Ringer began her career on the Copyright Office staff in 1949. She served as the head of the Renewal and Assignment Section; the assistant chief, acting chief and chief of the Examining Division; assistant Register of Copyrights for Examining; and the assistant Register of Copyrights.

She helped draft the Universal Copyright Convention (UCC) and served as a general rapporteur for the establishment of the Rome Convention for the Protection of Performers, Producers of Phonograms and Broadcast Organizations. Ringer contributed to the 1967 Intellectual Property Conference at Stockholm that further revised the UCC and Berne Convention. Ringer also taught at the Georgetown University Law Center, where she was the university's first woman adjunct professor of law.

Ringer worked as the Director of the Copyright Division of the United Nations Educational, Scientific, and Cultural Organization (UNESCO) in Paris from 1972 to 1973. In 1973, she left her position with UNESCO to become the Register of Copyrights. Ringer retired in May 1980 and entered private practice with the Washington, D.C. law firm, Spencer & Kaye.

After she retired, Ringer was invited to testify about the convention before the Judiciary Subcommittee on Patents, Copyrights and Trademarks. In 1985, Ringer served as the general rapporteur of the Brussels conference, which adopted the international Convention Relating to the Distribution of Programme-Carrying Signals Transmitted by Satellite provision of the Berne Convention. Ringer returned to government in 1993 to serve as Co-Chair of the Librarian's Advisory Committee on Copyright Registration and Deposit (ACCORD) and as the Acting Register of Copyrights.

Ringer published studies, monographs, and articles in legal and professional journals and conducted empirical research about copyright law throughout her career. Ringer also wrote the copyright law article for the Fifteenth Edition of the Encyclopædia Britannica.

== Lawsuit to become Register of Copyrights ==
In 1971, Ringer was passed over for the position of Register of Copyrights, the highest copyright-related position in the United States. Ringer's male colleague, George D. Cary, received the appointment instead. Ringer challenged the appointment under Library of Congress regulations and filing a discrimination lawsuit against L. Quincy Mumford, the Librarian of Congress.

Ringer charged that the Librarian of Congress failed to follow personnel regulations and appointed Cary because of sex discrimination and race discrimination. She noted her superior qualifications, including her experience and performance reviews, as evidence of sex discrimination. Ringer also pointed to her willingness to speak openly about racial problems and her advocacy for the rights of African American employees as evidence of racial discrimination.

The D.C. District Court held that "the Librarian violated his own regulation regarding discrimination" in the choice of Cary over Ringer for that position. The court declared Cary's appointment null and void, and directed the Librarian to take corrective action.

Ringer was appointed as the 8th Register of Copyrights on November 19, 1973.

== Work on 1976 Copyright Act ==
Within a few years of joining the Copyright Office, Ringer sought to update the 1909 Copyright Act. Ringer wrote and spoke about how copyright laws should be updated to reflect new technologies, including television, commercial radio, and copy machines. Ringer made many key contributions over the 1976 Copyright Act's 21 years of development, including negotiating with stakeholders and lobbying Congress to fuel interest in updating copyright law.

She described the resulting legislation as

a completely new copyright statute, intended to deal with a whole range of problems undreamed of by the drafters of the 1909 Act. Even more important, the new statute makes a number of fundamental changes in the American copyright system, including some so profound that they may mark a shift in direction for the very philosophy of copyright itself.

Major copyright law changes in the 1976 Act included expanding the term of copyright protection from 28 years to life of the author plus 50 years and codifying the fair use doctrine. The inclusion of dual gender pronouns throughout the Copyright Act was also done at Ringer's insistence.

In 1977, Ringer was awarded the President's Award for Distinguished Federal Civilian Service for her role in the passage of the 1976 Copyright Act. Ringer later drafted the Copyright Renewal Act of 1992, which repealed termination and provided for automatic renewal for works copyrighted between 1964 and 1997. The US Copyright Office also established the Barbara Ringer Copyright Honors Program, which allows junior attorneys to work on copyright law and policy issues within the government.

Ringer later acknowledged the inadequacies of her legislation, calling it "a good 1950 copyright law." She advocated that the public interest in copyright "should be to provide the widest possible access to information of all kinds." Ringer collaborated with copyright attorneys, academics, librarians, content creators, and members of the judiciary to draft the Copyright Reform Act of 1993, but it was not enacted.

== Later life ==
In 1995, the Library of Congress awarded her its Distinguished Service Award for her "lifetime contributions to the field of copyright, both nationally and internationally, and for her contributions to the Library of Congress over a period of 40 years."

Ringer moved to rural Bath County, Virginia, where she cataloged books at her local public library. Ringer died in Lexington, Virginia on April 9, 2009, due to complications from dementia. She willed her collection of 20,000 movies and 1,500 books on film to the Library of Congress.
