= Karyn Temple =

13th Register of Copyrights and the Director of the U.S. Copyright Office

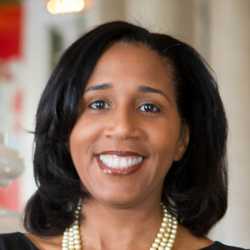

Register of Copyrights
- In office October 21, 2016 – January 3, 2020; Acting: October 21, 2016 – March 27, 2019
- Preceded by: Maria Pallante
- Succeeded by: Maria Strong (acting)

Personal details
- Education: University of Michigan (BA); Columbia University (JD)

Karyn A. Temple (previously Karyn Temple Claggett) is an attorney who served as the 13th United States Register of Copyrights, appointed to the position on March 27, 2019. Temple was Acting Register of Copyrights from October 21, 2016, to March 26, 2019, when Librarian of Congress Carla Hayden promoted her to Register of Copyrights and Director of the United States Copyright Office. She announced her resignation on December 9, 2019, effective January 3, 2020.

== Education ==
Temple earned her BA in English from the University of Michigan, in Ann Arbor. She earned her J.D. from Columbia Law School, where she was a senior editor of the Columbia Law Review and a Harlan Fiske Stone Scholar.

== Career ==
Temple served as senior counsel to the deputy attorney general of the United States. She also worked for the Recording Industry Association of America and at the law firm Williams & Connolly, LLP. She began her legal career as a trial attorney for the U.S. Department of Justice’s Civil Division through its Honors Program and was a law clerk at the U.S. Court of Appeals for the Sixth Circuit.

Temple has served as Associate Register of Copyrights and director of policy and international affairs for the United States Copyright Office since January 30, 2013. She directed the Office of Policy and International Affairs, which represents the Copyright Office at meetings of government officials concerned with the international aspects of intellectual property protection, and she provided regular support to Congress and its committees on statutory amendments and construction. Prior to that, she served as senior counsel in the Office of Policy and International Affairs.

She is, according to Billboard Magazine, "seen as being evenhanded on the kinds of intellectual property issues that have become contentious in the digital age." The Professional Photographers of America say that she "has demonstrated a thoughtful approach to copyright policy and to [Copyright] Office management overall."

In December 2019, the Copyright Office announced that Temple was leaving the Office to join the Motion Picture Association, effective January 3, 2020. On December 18, Librarian of Congress Carla Hayden appointed Maria Strong as acting register to serve until a replacement for Temple is found.

Government offices
Preceded by Maria Pallante	Register of Copyrights; 2016–2020; Acting: 2016–2019	Succeeded by Maria Strong; Acting
