= Maria Strong =

Maria Strong may refer to:

- Maria Strong (athlete), Australian shot put Paralympian
- Maria Strong (attorney), American attorney and Associate Register of Copyrights
