= William L. Brown =

William L. Brown may refer to:

- William L. Brown (geneticist) (1913–1991), American geneticist
- William L. Brown (politician) (1840–1906), Ohio and New York politician
- William Laurence Brown (1755–1830), Scottish divine (theologian)
- William Lincoln Brown (1862–1940), second Register of Copyrights in the United States Copyright Office
- William Liston Brown (1842–1929), American industrialist
- William Little Brown (1789–1830), justice of the Tennessee Supreme Court

== See also ==
- William Brown (disambiguation)
