= Maria Pallante =

12th United States Register of Copyrights and attorney

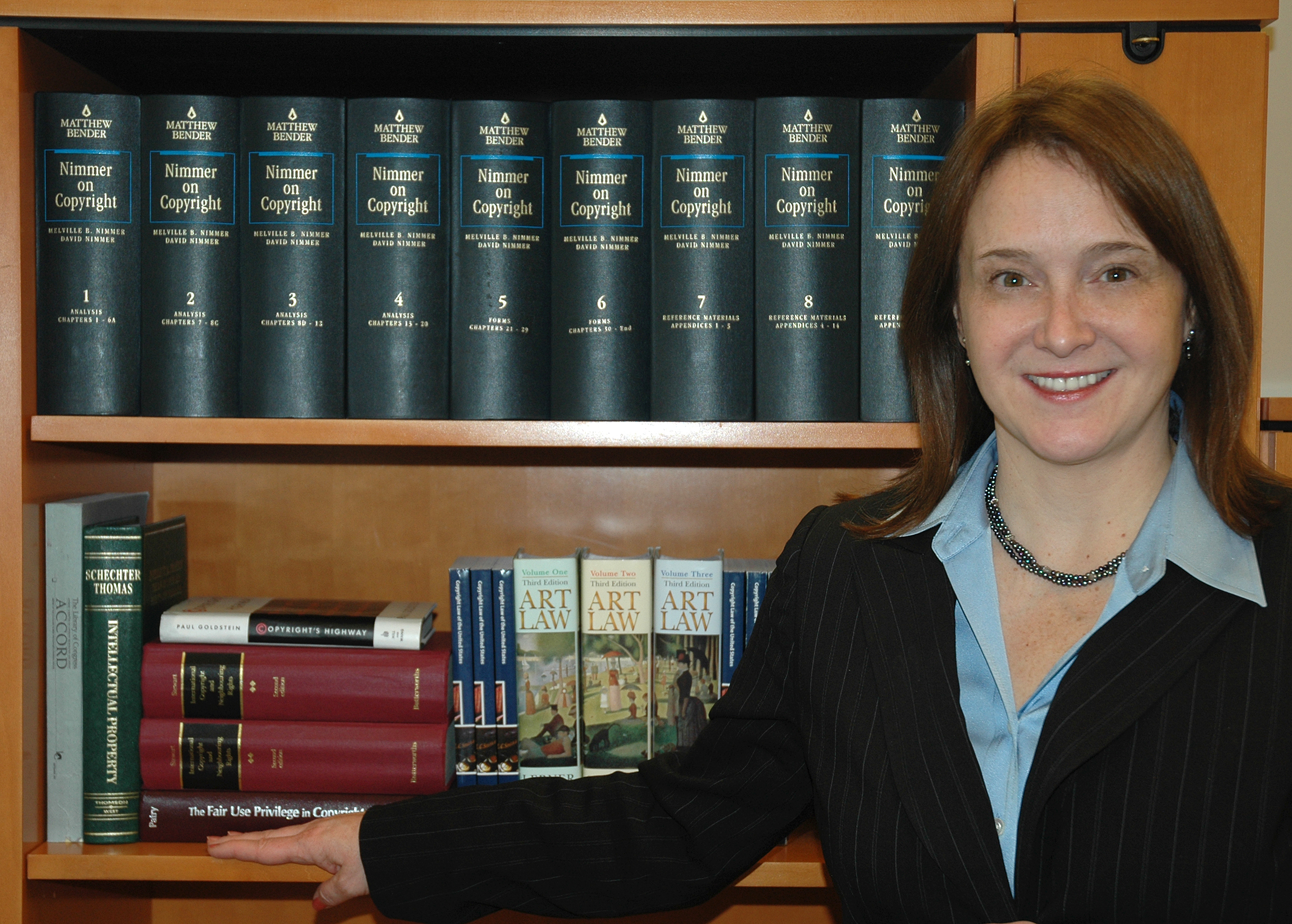
- Maria Pallante, Register of Copyrights

Register of Copyrights
- In office January 1, 2011 – October 21, 2016; Acting: January 1, 2011 – June 1, 2011
- Appointed by: James H. Billington
- Preceded by: Marybeth Peters
- Succeeded by: Karyn Temple (acting)

Personal details
- Born: February 5, 1964 (age 62)
- Education: Misericordia University (BA); George Washington University (JD)

Maria A. Pallante (born February 5, 1964) is the president and chief executive officer of the Association of American Publishers, a publishing industry trade association. Pallante is an American attorney who previously served as the 12th United States Register of Copyrights. She was appointed acting register effective January 1, 2011, succeeding Marybeth Peters, who retired effective December 31, 2010. On June 1, 2011, she was permanently appointed to the position.

Prior to her appointment, Pallante had served in the Copyright Office as Associate Register for Policy and International Affairs (2008–2010); Deputy General Counsel (2007–2008); and Policy Advisor (1996–1997).

Pallante had been a resident of Westville, New Jersey.

Aside from working for the Copyright Office, Pallante had been intellectual property counsel for the Guggenheim Museums (1999–2007), Executive Director of the National Writers Union (1993–1995), and assistant director of the Authors Guild (1991–1993).

Shortly after becoming the Register of Copyrights, Pallante proposed an ambitious plan to reinvent and update copyright law and move the Copyright Office into the 21st century. In her paper, titled The Next Great Copyright Act she states in part "it is difficult to see how a twenty-first century copyright law could function well without a twenty-first century agency". In a letter to congressman John Conyers Jr. she said that the copyright office should no longer be part of the library, citing several concerns including "mounting operational tensions."

On October 21, 2016, Pallante was abruptly removed from her position. Librarian of Congress Carla Hayden said she had been appointed senior advisor for digital strategy, an appointment made without Pallante's prior knowledge. Rather than accept the position, Pallante submitted her resignation on October 24, 2016. Recording artist Don Henley said Pallante's ouster was “an enormous blow” to artists, and that Pallante was "a champion of copyright and stood up for the creative community." Pallante was criticized by public interest groups for having supported controversial legislation such as the Stop Online Piracy Act, having objected to a proposal by the FCC to enable an open platform for television set-top boxes, based on consultation with the content industry, and the Office having spent $12 million over five years on a failed attempt to implement a new computer system at the Copyright Office. Karyn Temple became acting register of copyrights.

In January 2017, Pallante was named president and CEO of the Association of American Publishers.

Government offices
Preceded by Marybeth Peters	Register of Copyrights; 2011–2016	Succeeded by Karyn Temple
