= Thorvald Solberg =

First Registrar of Copyrights (1852–1949)

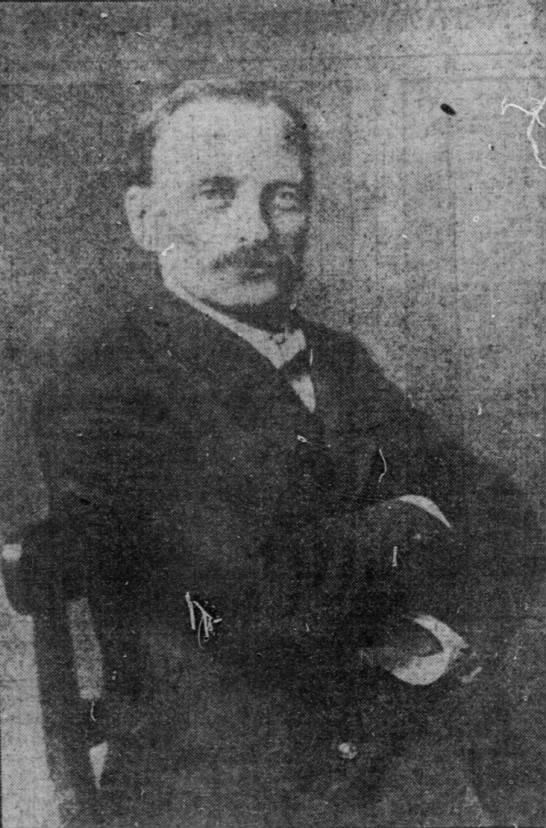

Register of Copyrights
- In office July 22, 1897 – April 21, 1930
- Preceded by: Position established
- Succeeded by: William Lincoln Brown

Personal details
- Born: April 22, 1852 Manitowoc, Wisconsin, U.S.
- Died: July 15, 1949 (aged 97) Glen Echo, Maryland, U.S.
- Spouse: Mary Nourse

Thorvald Solberg (April 22, 1852 – July 15, 1949) was the first register of copyrights (1897–1930) in the United States Copyright Office. He was a noted authority on copyright and played an instrumental role in shaping the Copyright Act of 1909.

== Early life ==
Thorvald Solberg was born in Manitowoc, Wisconsin. He was the eldest of six children born of immigrant Norwegian parents. Solberg attended public schools, working for booksellers after graduation in Manitowoc, Boston, Detroit, Knoxville, and Omaha.

On May 1, 1876, Solberg began working in the Library of Congress as a cataloguer. In 1876, he became part of the Library's law department staff, despite not being a lawyer. While there, he played an active role in the direction and control of the Library's copyright registration and deposit functions. He remained in that position until he left the Library altogether in 1889 to work for the Boston Book Company.

== Register of Copyrights ==
In 1897, Congress created the United States Copyright Office as a separate department of the Library of Congress to handle the administrative functions of copyright law. Solberg was widely supported to become the first head of the Office due to his growing reputation as a national authority on copyright (and due to some lobbying on his own part for the post). After being interviewed by President William McKinley, Solberg was appointed by Librarian of Congress John Russell Young and took office as the first Register of Copyrights on July 22, 1897, with an annual salary of $3000 and a staff of 29 clerks.

During his tenure as Register, Solberg played an active role in advancing United States copyright law. He advocated copyright reform and was instrumental in the passage of the Copyright Act of 1909, one of the most significant revisions in United States copyright law. He was known as a champion for the rights of authors and supported relaxing the registration and deposit requirements of copyright law, consistent with the shift away from copyright formalities in the Berne Convention. Solberg also pushed for the United States to join the Berne Convention.

Thorvald Solberg retired as Register on April 21, 1930, his 78th birthday. He remains the longest-serving Register of Copyrights.

== Personal life ==
Thorvald Solberg was married to Mary Adelaide Nourse of Lynn, Massachusetts. He resided on Capitol Hill when he began his stint as Register of Copyrights. In 1914, Solberg moved to Glen Echo, Maryland, where he resided until his death. Solberg was a prolific writer, and he compiled several bibliographies and compilations of United States and foreign copyright laws.

== Selected writings ==
- Copyright in Congress 1789-1904: A Bibliography, and Chronological Record of all Proceedings in Congress in Relation to Copyright from April 15, 1789, to April 28, 1904, First Congress, 1st Session, to Fifty-eighth Congress, 2d Session, (Government Printing Office, February 1905)
- Copyright Law Reform, The Yale Law Journal, Vol. 35, No. 1 (Nov., 1925), pp. 48–75
- The International Copyright Union, The Yale Law Journal, Vol. 36, No. 1 (Nov., 1926), pp. 68–111
- The Present Copyright Situation, The Yale Law Journal, Vol. 40, No. 2 (Dec., 1930), pp. 184–214

== Citations ==
- Biography of Thorvald Solberg, U.S. Copyright Office
- U.S. Copyright Office History
- Patry, William (September 2009). Patry on Copyright. Thomson Reuters/West.

Government offices
New office	Register of Copyrights; 1897–1930	Succeeded by William Lincoln Brown
