= David Ladd (attorney) =

American lawyer

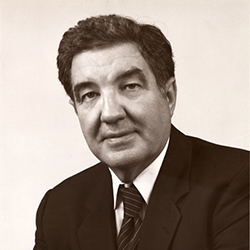

Register of Copyrights
- In office June 2, 1980 – January 2, 1985
- Preceded by: Barbara Ringer
- Succeeded by: Donald Curran

U.S. Commissioner of Patents
- In office 1961–1963
- President: John F. Kennedy
- Preceded by: Robert C. Watson
- Succeeded by: Edward J. Brenner

Personal details
- Born: September 18, 1926 Portsmouth, Ohio, U.S.
- Died: October 12, 1994 (aged 68) Arlington, Virginia, U.S.
- Spouse: Ann Weaver
- Education: University of Chicago (BA, JD)

Military service
- Branch/service: U.S. Army
- Years of service: 1945–1946

David Lowell Ladd (September 18, 1926 – October 12, 1994) was a former Commissioner of Patents and Register of Copyrights in the United States, the first (and currently only) individual to serve in both offices.

Ladd was born in Portsmouth, Ohio and attended the University of Chicago, where he received a bachelor of arts degree and, later, a degree in law. In 1961, Ladd was appointed to lead the U.S. Patent Office by President John F. Kennedy. At age 35, he was the second youngest man to ever hold the position.

As Commissioner of Patents, Ladd led a comprehensive reorganization of the Office and was present during the Office's 125th anniversary and granting of patent number 3,000,000.

In 1980, Ladd succeeded Barbara Ringer as U.S. Register of Copyrights. Like Ringer, Ladd was seen as a strong advocate for authors' rights, and he adopted the position that the Copyright Office should play an active role in favor of copyright protection in public policy discussions.

Ladd was succeeded by Donald Curran in 1985 and returned to private practice at Wiley, Rein & Fielding. He retired in 1987 and died in his home in Alexandria, Virginia in 1994, survived by his wife.

Government offices
Preceded by Robert C. Watson	Commissioner of Patents; 1961–1963	Succeeded by Edward J. Brenner
Preceded by Barbara Ringer	Register of Copyrights; 1980–1985	Succeeded by Donald Curran
