= Marvin Comisky =

American lawyer

Marvin Comisky (1918–2010) was a major figure in the Philadelphia legal community for decades. Chairman emeritus of the law firm Blank Rome and former head of the Philadelphia and state bar associations, he halted discriminatory hiring practices in Philadelphia law firms, and is one of few attorneys to be regarded as a legend in the profession.,

Comisky was a law graduate of the University of Pennsylvania. He served in the United States Army during World War II.
