= Abraham L. Kaminstein =

United States Register of Copyright

Abraham Kaminstein
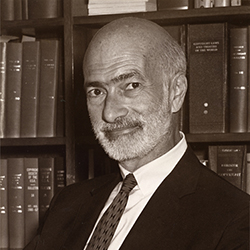

Register of Copyrights
- In office December 24, 1960 – August 31, 1971
- Preceded by: Arthur Fisher
- Succeeded by: George D. Cary

Personal details
- Born: May 13, 1912 New York City, New York, U.S.
- Died: September 10, 1977 (aged 65) Washington, D.C., U.S.
- Education: City College of New York (BS); Harvard University (LLB, LLM)

Abraham Lewis Kaminstein (May 13, 1912, New York City, New York—September 10, 1977) was the sixth United States Register of Copyrights. He first entered the role in an acting capacity after the death of his predecessor, Arthur Fisher, in November 1960. The Librarian of Congress, L. Quincy Mumford, officially appointed him on December 24, 1960, and he served until August 31, 1971, when he resigned due to poor health and was succeeded by George D. Cary.

== Early life and education ==
Abraham L. Kaminstein was born on May 13, 1912, in New York City. He attended public schools in the city before earning a Bachelor of Social Science (BSS) degree from the City College of New York in 1932. He continued his education at Harvard Law School, where he received an LLB in 1935 and an LLM in 1936. During this time, he also served as a research fellow from 1936 to 1937. Kaminstein began his career in government service in 1937, working as an attorney across various agencies before joining the Copyright Office.

== Career ==
Starting in the 1950s, Kaminstein was very involved in initiating the research agenda that eventually culminated in a general revision of the copyright law in the United States and the Copyright Act of 1976. He was a leading delegate of the United States to meetings of parties to the Berne Convention and the Universal Copyright Convention.
