= Ralph Oman =

American lawyer (born 1940)

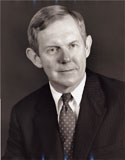

Register of Copyrights
- In office September 23, 1985 – January 8, 1994
- Preceded by: Donald Curran
- Succeeded by: Barbara Ringer (acting)

Personal details
- Born: 1940 (age 85–86) Huntington, New York, U.S.
- Education: Hamilton College (BA); Georgetown University (JD)

Military service
- Branch/service: U.S. Navy
- Years of service: 1965–1970
- Rank: Naval Flight Officer

Ralph Oman (born 1940 in Huntington, New York) is an American lawyer and former Register of Copyrights. He is currently the Pravel, Hewitt, Kimball and Kreiger Professorial Lecturer in Intellectual Property and Patent Law at The George Washington University Law School.

== Education ==
Oman studied at the Sorbonne in Paris in 1960-61 and earned a Bachelor of Arts degree in history from Hamilton College in 1962.

In 1973, Oman received a juris doctor degree from Georgetown University, where he served as Executive Editor of the Georgetown Journal of International Law. He is a member of the District of Columbia Bar and the Supreme Court Bar.

== Early career ==
From 1962 to 1964, Oman worked for the U.S. Department of State as a Foreign Service Officer in Saudi Arabia. He served with the U.S. Navy as a Naval Flight Officer from 1965 to 1970 and was decorated for his service in Vietnam. He was posted in Fort Cameron.

Following law school, Oman served as law clerk to C. Stanley Blair, U.S. District Court Judge for the District of Maryland. From 1974 to 1975, Oman was a trial attorney with the U.S. Department of Justice Antitrust Division.

== Federal Government Service ==
In 1975, Oman moved to the U.S. Senate, where he worked for Senator Hugh Scott of Pennsylvania as Chief Minority Counsel on the Subcommittee on Patents, Trademarks, and Copyrights. He helped the Senator draft the language and negotiate the compromises that resulted in the passage of the Copyright Act of 1976. In 1977, Senator Scott retired and Oman became senior lawyer to Senator Charles Mathias of Maryland, the Senate's leading proponent of strong copyright protection. In 1982, Oman became Chief Counsel of the newly revived Subcommittee on Patents, Copyrights, and Trademarks, and in 1985 he scheduled the first Senate hearing in 50 years on U.S. adherence to the Berne Convention for the Protection of Literary and Artistic Works.

From the Chief Counsel position, Oman was appointed Register of Copyrights on September 23, 1985. As Register, he helped move the United States into the Berne Convention in 1989.

In 1990, he headed the U.S. delegation to the diplomatic conference that adopted the Washington Treaty on the Protection of Microchips, and he co-chaired the Celebration of the Bicentennial of the U.S. patent and copyright laws. During his eight years as Register, Oman made increased international protection of American copyrights his highest priority, and, to promote that effort, he established the International Copyright Institute to train foreign copyright officials. He also initiated a pilot program to convert the copyright registration process to digital/internet technology. He is one of three founding directors of the U.S. Committee for the World Intellectual Property Organization. Oman resigned as Register effective January 8, 1994.

After retiring from federal service, Oman entered private practice. He began teaching at The George Washington University Law School in 1993. He is currently the Pravel, Hewitt, Kimball and Kreiger Professorial Lecturer in Intellectual Property and Patent Law at GW Law.

== Amicus Curiae ==
- Allen v. Cooper, et al. Supreme Court of the United States, August 2019 - Copyright, Sovereign Immunity
- Allen v. Cooper, et al. Supreme Court of the United States, February 2019 - Copyright, Sovereign Immunity
- Allen v. Cooper, et al. United States Court of Appeals, October 2017 - Copyright, Sovereign Immunity
- Oracle America v. Google United States Court of Appeals, February 2017 – Copyright, Fair Use, Software
- Lisa R. Kirby, et al. v. Marvel Characters, et al. Supreme Court of the United States, June 2014 – Copyright, Work for Hire
- ABC, et al. v. Aereo Supreme Court of the United States, March 2014 - Copyright, Intellectual Property
- Petrella v. Metro-Goldwyn-Mayer United States Court of Appeals, November 2013 – Copyright, Laches
- Cambridge University Press, et al. v. Mark P. Becker United States Court of Appeals, February 2013 – Copyright, Fair Use
- American Society of Composers, Authors and Publishers v. United States of America Supreme Court of the United States, June 2011 - Copyright, Electronic Files

== Selected works ==
- Oman, Ralph (2018). "Computer Software as Copyrightable Subject Matter: Oracle v. Google, Legislative Intent, and the Scope of Rights in Digital Works" (PDF). Harvard Journal of Law & Technology. 31 (Special Issue Spring 2018).
- Oman, Ralph (2009). "Statement of Ralph Oman Pravel, Hewitt, Kimball and Kreiger Professorial Lecturer in Intellectual Property and Patent Law The George Washington University Law School Before the Committee on the Judiciary United States Senate On "The Performance Rights Act and Platform Parity"" (PDF). U.S. Senate (August 2009).

Government offices
Preceded by Donald Curran	Register of Copyrights; 1985–1994	Succeeded by Barbara Ringer; Acting
