= Massimo F. D'Angelo =

American real estate attorney

- Education: University of Massachusetts Amherst (BA); Thomas M. Cooley Law School (JD)
- Occupation: Lawyer
- Employer: Blank Rome

Massimo F. D'Angelo is an American lawyer who handles real estate and commercial litigation in New York City. He is a partner at Blank Rome.

His clients have included unit owners at the Atelier, a Manhattan condominium tower that city investigators raided in 2018 over illegal short-term rentals, and the radio host DJ Envy, who was sued by investors in an alleged real estate fraud scheme in 2023. D'Angelo worked on the legal team seeking the release of Mikheil Saakashvili, the jailed former president of Georgia. In 2026 he represented two brokerages in a dispute over listings moved to Compass.

== Education ==
D'Angelo graduated from the University of Massachusetts Amherst in 2004 with a Bachelor of Arts. He earned his Juris Doctor at Thomas M. Cooley Law School in 2007 and was admitted to the New York and New Jersey bars the following year.

== Legal career ==
In 2010, two years after his admission, D'Angelo represented Juan Miguel and Iluminada Pena, Newark homeowners who said a mortgage company had used a foreclosure rescue scheme to turn a $125,000 loan into a sale of their house. Essex County Superior Court Judge Kenneth Levy granted the Penas a preliminary injunction and then awarded them interim counsel fees in Pena v. Newell Funding, LLC. Levy held that the fee-shifting section of the New Jersey Consumer Fraud Act applied to a party who obtained equitable relief before final judgment, which the New Jersey Law Journal reported as a question of first impression.

He was a partner at Akerman until May 2023, when he moved to Blank Rome as part of a group of litigators the firm hired in New York. He co-chairs Blank Rome's real estate industry team.

=== Residential real estate ===
The Atelier is a condominium tower on West 42nd Street in Manhattan. In 2018 D'Angelo represented a group of its unit owners who said the board had let an illegal short-term rental operation run in the building, and who accused the board of negligence. After complaints from residents, the city's Mayor's Office of Special Enforcement raided the building in October 2018. The raid led to 27 notices of violation against 20 unit owners. Two of them sat on the condominium board. D'Angelo said his clients wanted the rentals stopped for good, pointing to fire and life-safety risks and to hotel occupancy taxes that were going unpaid. He also brought a complaint to the same office on behalf of residents against the board's president, who managed the building and whose company was its exclusive brokerage.

In 2019 he represented a couple who sued their West Village co-op, saying radon in their apartment had caused the cancer deaths of their cat and four dogs. D'Angelo called the case unprecedented in New York City.

Residents of the West Village hired him again in 2025, this time to oppose a private padel club with a rooftop restaurant planned for 120 Leroy Street. He told the State Liquor Authority that 450 neighbors had signed a petition against it. The authority denied the project a temporary permit, and its backers were left to refile for a liquor license without the rooftop.

=== Commercial real estate ===
D'Angelo represented the Italian menswear maker Kiton in its 2021 lease of a three-level boutique at 692 Madison Avenue.

When the pandemic shut its gym at 700 Broadway in Manhattan, the boxing fitness chain Rumble stopped paying rent, and D'Angelo represented the building's retail condominium owner in the case that followed. Justice Laurence Love of the New York Supreme Court ruled in April 2022 that the lease still bound Rumble to pay, and he awarded the owner at least $925,572 in rent for the months from March 2020 through December 2021, plus attorney fees. The two sides later settled.

In a Hoboken case he represented the guarantor of a gym lease, Town Sports International Holdings. Washington-Hudson Associates II won a $542,800 summary judgment against the guarantor of a gym lease there after rent went unpaid during the shutdown, and D'Angelo took the guarantor's appeal in Washington-Hudson Associates II, LLC v. Town Sports International Holdings, Inc. The Appellate Division reversed in April 2023. It found real factual disputes over whether the landlord had done enough to mitigate its damages. Later that year he was involved in a fight over an 18-inch strip of land beside a luxury hotel that Extell planned in the Diamond District.

In 2026 The Corcoran Group started shifting listings off a jointly funded platform and onto Compass technology. Douglas Elliman and Brown Harris Stevens went to court over it with D'Angelo as their lawyer. Justice Melissa Crane was sitting as the emergency judge when she signed a temporary order in September that froze work on the transfer. The brokerages' wider request was held over for a hearing in November.

=== Mikheil Saakashvili ===
By late 2022 D'Angelo was one of the lawyers working to free Saakashvili, who had been held in Georgia since his arrest in October 2021. Akerman's contract for the work was with Saakashvili's mother, Giuli Alasania, and was valued at just over $917,000; the firm disclosed it in a February 2023 filing with the United States Department of Justice under the Foreign Agents Registration Act.

On CNN's Erin Burnett OutFront in December 2022 and February 2023, D'Angelo said tests on Saakashvili's hair, nails and tissue had found heavy metals, including mercury and arsenic, and that he believed his client had been poisoned in small doses through his food and water. He urged the United States to suspend aid to Georgia and to impose sanctions. Poland, France, the United States and Ukraine, he said, were among the countries prepared to take Saakashvili in.

Saakashvili was sentenced to another nine years in prison in March 2025. That November he was moved from a Tbilisi clinic back to prison.

=== DJ Envy ===
In 2023 D'Angelo took on the defense of RaaShaun Casey, the radio host known as DJ Envy, after investors named Casey in civil suits over an alleged real estate fraud run by Cesar Pina, who had been Casey's business associate. Pina was arrested in October 2023 on a federal wire fraud charge and pleaded not guilty. In a video posted after his arrest he denied any wrongdoing. Casey was not charged with a crime.

D'Angelo called his client "a victim himself." He said Casey's dealings with Pina were limited to real estate seminars and one investment, in a school building in Paterson, New Jersey, and that Casey had been pulled into the suits because he was famous. A lawyer for the investors said Casey bore responsibility for promoting Pina to his audience. D'Angelo separately filed a defamation suit for Casey over social media posts about the scheme.
