= Maria Strong (attorney) =

American lawyer and government official

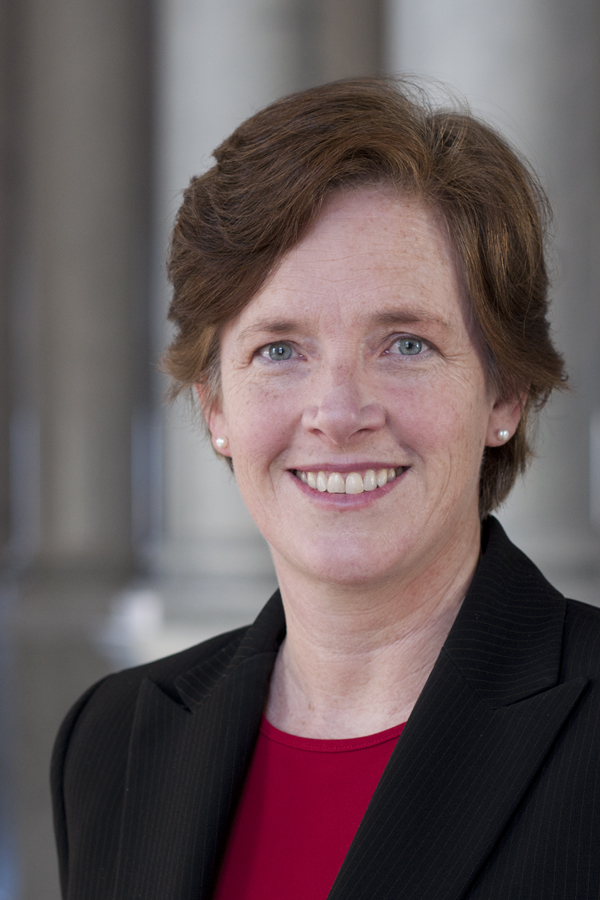

Register of Copyrights
- Acting
- In office January 5, 2020 – October 24, 2020
- Appointed by: Carla Hayden
- Preceded by: Karyn Temple
- Succeeded by: Shira Perlmutter

Personal details
- Education: University of California, Los Angeles (BA); University of Southern California (MA); George Washington University (JD)

Maria Strong is an American attorney who has served as the Associate Register of Copyrights and Director of Policy and International Affairs for the United States Copyright Office since 2019. Strong served as acting Register of Copyrights, the top officer of the United States Copyright Office, in 2020.

== Education ==
She earned her BA in communication studies from UCLA, her MA in communications management from the USC Annenberg School of Communications, and her JD from the George Washington University Law School.

== Career ==
Strong began her legal career as a staff attorney for the Federal Communications Commission, and spent nineteen years in private practice in Washington, D.C. representing clients at the intersection of copyright and international trade. She was vice-president of International Intellectual Property Alliance between 1995 and 2001.

Strong joined the Copyright Office in 2010 as Senior Counsel for Policy and International Affairs. From April to July 2013, she served as the Office's Acting General Counsel. She was named Deputy Director of Policy and International Affairs in 2015, and Director in April 2019.

On December 18, 2019, Librarian of Congress Carla Hayden appointed her acting register of copyrights, effective January 5, 2020, to serve until a replacement was named for the departing register Karyn Temple. During her leadership in 2020, Strong managed the office through operational challenges caused by the COVID-19 pandemic. The Office released the report, Section 512 of Title 17, along with a new webpage on the Digital Millennium Copyright Act; continued regulatory work to implement the Music Modernization Act; and launched the eighth triennial section 1201 rulemaking. The Office adjusted procedures and practices to promote better public services and continued to provide core services involving registration, recordation, access to public records, and statutory licensing. Modernization of IT systems continued, with the first public release of the online recordation pilot and the soft launch of a new public records system.

In May 2020, the office issued a new edition of the Copyright Act (Circular 92) as part of celebrating its 150th anniversary. Strong was named one of the 50 most influential people in intellectual property in 2020 by the publication Managing IP. In addition to serving as Acting Register, Strong continued to serve as Director of PIA. She returned to that position full-time when Shira Perlmutter took office as the fourteenth register of copyrights on October 25, 2020. She then served as Acting Assistant Register of Copyrights and Director of Operations from November 2021 to March 2022.

As the Associate Register of Copyrights and Director of Policy and International Affairs (PIA), Strong advises the Register on policy functions of the Copyright Office, including domestic and international copyright analyses, legislative support for Congress, and trade negotiations involving intellectual property matters.

== Selected publications ==
- Strong, M. (2016). Enforcement Tools in the US Government Toolbox to Support Countries' Compliance with Copyright Obligations. Colum. JL & Arts, 40, 359.
- Strong M, International Intellectual Property Alliance. Copyright Piracy in Latin America : Trade Losses due to Piracy and the Adequacy of Copyright Protection in 16 Central and South American Countries. The Alliance; 1992.
- Strong M. A View from the US Copyright Office: Serving the Public, Congress, the Courts, and More from 2001 to 2021. In: Developments and Directions in Intellectual Property Law : 20 Years of the IPKat; 2023. doi:10.1093/oso/9780192864475.003.0008
- Strong M. The growing importance of the copyright industries to the United States economy. Copyright world. Published online 1998.
- Strong M. Copyright Enforcement : Basic Considerations and Strategies to Protect Copyrights Abroad. International trademarks and copyrights : enforcement and management. Published online 2004.

Government offices
Preceded by Karyn Temple	Register of Copyrights; Acting; 2020	Succeeded by Shira Perlmutter
