= William Lincoln Brown =

American Register of Copyrights

William Brown
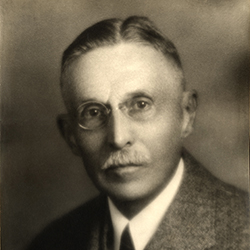

Register of Copyrights
- In office April 22, 1930 – July 1, 1936; Acting: April 22, 1930 – June 4, 1934
- Preceded by: Thorvald Solberg
- Succeeded by: Clement Lincoln Bouvé

Personal details
- Born: William Lincoln Brown; 1862 Brewster, Massachusetts, U.S.
- Died: February 1940 (aged 77–78)

William Lincoln Brown (1862–1940) was the second Register of Copyrights (1934–36) in the United States Copyright Office. He presided over the office during a time when Congress was active in proposing copyright legislation in the wake of the 1909 Copyright Act and leading up to the Copyright Act of 1976.

Born in Brewster, Massachusetts, in 1862, William Lincoln Brown became chief of the Bookkeeping Division of the Copyright Office in 1907, rising to chief clerk shortly afterward. He left the Office in 1917 to become officer of the American Library Association's War Service Committee but returned three years later. Brown performed as acting Register of Copyrights upon Thorvald Solberg's retirement in 1930 until being officially named to the position.

A retirement notice in the 1937 annual report of the Register of Copyrights described Brown as "a quiet and competent administrator, a man of high personal ideals, and a strong sense of duty and justice."

Government offices
Preceded by Thorvald Solberg	Register of Copyrights; 1930–1936	Succeeded by Clement Lincoln Bouvé
