= Marybeth Peters =

American attorney (1939–2022)

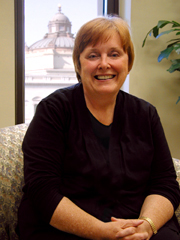

Register of Copyrights
- In office August 7, 1994 – December 31, 2010
- Preceded by: Barbara Ringer (acting)
- Succeeded by: Maria Pallante

Personal details
- Born: June 12, 1939 Pawtucket, Rhode Island, U.S.
- Died: September 29, 2022 (aged 83)
- Education: Rhode Island College (BA); George Washington University (JD)

Marybeth Peters (June 12, 1939 – September 29, 2022) was an American attorney who served as the 11th United States Register of Copyrights from August 7, 1994, to December 31, 2010.

== Background ==
Prior to serving as register, Peters held the positions of Policy Planning Adviser to the Register, Acting General Counsel of the Copyright Office and as chief of both the Examining Division and the Information and Reference Divisions. In addition to over 40 years of service to the Copyright Office, Peters served as a consultant on copyright law to the World Intellectual Property Organization in Geneva, Switzerland (1989–1990). She obtained her B.S. degree from Rhode Island College in 1961 and her J.D., with honors, from The George Washington University Law School in 1971.

Peters retired on December 31, 2010. She was succeeded by Maria Pallante, previously senior adviser to the Librarian of Congress. After leaving the Copyright Office, she was an Intellectual Property Advisor with the law firm Muncy, Geissler, Olds & Lowe.

Peters died September 29, 2022, at the age of 83.

Government offices
Preceded by Barbara Ringer; Acting	Register of Copyrights; 1994–2010	Succeeded by Maria Pallante
