= Blank Rome =

United States-based law firm

- Headquarters: Philadelphia, Pennsylvania, U.S.
- No. of offices: 16 (15 in the United States, 1 in China)
- No. of attorneys: 750
- Major practice areas: Multipractice law and government affairs
- Key people: Grant S. Palmer, Chair and Managing Partner; Alan J. Hoffman, Chair Emeritus
- Revenue: $750M (2024)
- Website: Official website

Blank Rome (formerly known as Blank Rome Comisky & McCauley) is a law firm with 16 offices and 800 attorneys and principals who provide legal and advocacy services to clients in the United States and around the world.

Founded in 1946, Blank Rome represents a broad range of clients across a spectrum of industries. The firm has 16 offices in the United States and expanded internationally in May 2011 by opening a Shanghai Representative Office in the People's Republic of China. In 2003, the firm established Blank Rome Government Relations LLC in Washington, D.C., a wholly owned subsidiary and government affairs firm that provides strategic lobbying, advocacy, and communications counsel.

== History ==
Blank Rome was founded in 1946 in Philadelphia, Pennsylvania, and has since expanded its geographic footprint across the United States. The following combinations and additions have occurred:

- 1959: Brumbelow & Comisky, Philadelphia
- 1961: Newman & Master, Philadelphia
- 1984: Wexler Weisman Forman & Shapiro, Philadelphia
- 1998: Wigman, Cohen, Leitner & Myers, Washington, D.C.
- 2000: Tenzer Greenblatt, New York
- 2003: Dyer Ellis & Joseph, Washington, D.C.
- 2005: Shack Siegel Katz & Flaherty, New York
- 2006: Healy & Baillie, New York
- 2011: Abrams Scott & Bickley, LLP, Houston
- 2012: Janis, Schuelke & Wechsler, Washington, D.C.
- 2013: Bell, Ryniker & Letourneau, Houston
- 2014: Finestone & Richter and Margolis & Tisman LLP, Los Angeles and San Francisco
- 2015: Wong Cabello, Houston
- 2016: Dickstein Shapiro LLP, Washington, D.C.; Phillips Lerner, Los Angeles
- 2017: Kasowitz Benson Torres LLP, Los Angeles
- 2019: Buter, Buzard, Fishbein & Royce LLP, Los Angeles; four-partner group from Katten Muchin Rosenman LLP, Chicago

Additionally, in 2003, the Firm established Blank Rome Government Relations LLC, a wholly owned subsidiary and government affairs firm in Washington, D.C.

== Practice areas ==
Blank Rome's practice areas include commercial and corporate litigation; class action defense, financial institutions litigation, and regulatory compliance (FILARC); corporate, M&A, and securities; cross border/international, energy, environmental, and mass torts; finance, restructuring, and bankruptcy; government contracts; government relations and political law; insurance recovery; intellectual property and technology; intellectual property litigation; labor and employment; maritime and international trade; matrimonial and family law; real estate; tax, benefits, and private client; and white collar defense and investigations.

Key industry areas include aerospace, defense and government services, aviation, chemical, energy, finance and restructuring, financial services, gaming and entertainment, healthcare, hospitality, investment management, life sciences, maritime, private equity and investment funds, real estate, technology, and transportation.

Blank Rome Government Relations LLC is a wholly owned subsidiary and government affairs firm. Key services include Advocacy, Congressional Oversight and Investigations, Government Business, Government Ethics & Compliance, and Legislation & Regulation.

== Pro Bono Activities ==
Notable pro bono work includes:

- Assisting Afghan refugees seeking Humanitarian Parole in the United States, in addition to helping with expedited Afghan asylum cases
- Partnering with the Lawyers Committee for Civil Rights to organize and staff a nonpartisan election protection hotline for voters in the 2022 mid-term elections
- Working to assist transgender clients with legal name and gender marker changes
- Helping refugees to take their next step toward citizenship by applying for Green Cards
- Working with veterans seeking to upgrade their military discharge status
- Assisting small businesses and nonprofit organizations with corporate, real estate, tax, and intellectual property issues

== Notable lawyers and alumni ==
- Edward Cahn, former chief United States district judge for the Eastern District of Pennsylvania, serves as counsel in Blank Rome's Philadelphia office.
- Steve Castor
- Marvin Comisky, former chairman emeritus of Blank Rome and former head of the Philadelphia and state bar associations
- Barbara Comstock, American attorney and politician who served as the U.S. representative for Virginia's 10th congressional district from 2015 to 2019.
- Massimo F. D'Angelo, real estate attorney and commercial litigator.
- Geraldine Ferraro, former congresswoman and Vice-Presidential candidate, previously served as a principal at Blank Rome Government Relations LLC.
- James Giles, former chief judge of the United States District Court for the Eastern District of Pennsylvania, serves as counsel in Blank Rome's Philadelphia office.
- David F. Girard-diCarlo, former chairman of the SEPTA, elected co-chair and managing partner in 1988, reelected five times, serving until 2000; also appointed as the CEO of subsidiary Blank Rome Government Relations LLC, the lobbying branch of the law firm based in Washington, D.C.; served as the U.S. ambassador to Austria from July 2008 to January 2009.
- Keith Gottfried, former general counsel to the United States Department of Housing and Urban Development and a senior official in the administration of President George W. Bush, was a partner in Blank Rome's Washington, D.C., office.
- Nathaniel R. Jones, former judge of the United States Court of Appeals for the Sixth Circuit and former general counsel to the NAACP, previously served as the Firm's inaugural Chief Diversity and Inclusion Officer.
- Frederica Massiah-Jackson, Philadelphia County Court of Common Pleas judge, worked at the law firm before her election to the bench in 1983.
- David A. Norcross, former chairman of the New Jersey Republican State Committee and executive assistant to New Jersey Governor William T. Cahill, was a partner in Blank Rome's Philadelphia office.
- Stephen Orlofsky, former judge of the United States District Court for the District of New Jersey, is the chair of Blank Rome's Princeton office and leads the Firm's appellate practice.
- Gil Stein, former president and general counsel to the National Hockey League, worked at the law firm before becoming an executive with the Philadelphia Flyers in 1976.
- Sidney A. Wallace, former USCG rear admiral; former counsel to the Committee on Merchant Marine and Fisheries; firm's counsel.
