= Saul Perlmutter =

American astrophysicist and Nobel laureate (born 1959)

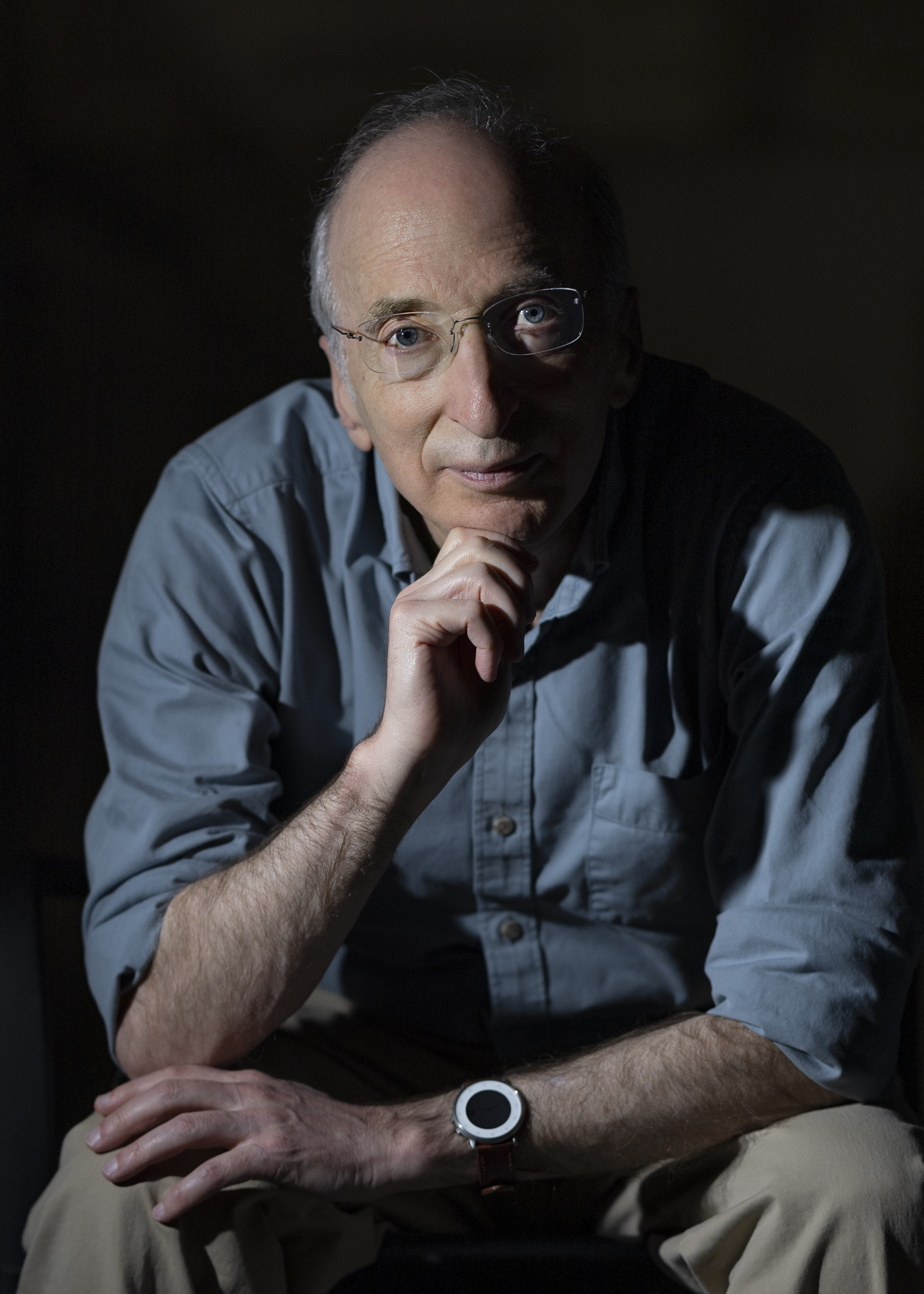
- Perlmutter in 2024
- Born: September 22, 1959 (age 67); Champaign-Urbana, Illinois, U.S.
- Education: Harvard University (AB); University of California, Berkeley (PhD)
- Known for: Accelerating universe / Dark energy
- Spouse: Laura Nelson (1 child)
- Relatives: Shira Perlmutter (sister)
- Awards: Ernest Orlando Lawrence Award (2002); Shaw Prize in Astronomy (2006); Gruber Prize in Cosmology (2007); Nobel Prize in Physics (2011); Breakthrough Prize in Fundamental Physics (2015)
- Scientific career
- Fields: Physics
- Workplaces: University of California, Berkeley/Lawrence Berkeley National Laboratory
- Thesis: An Astrometric Search for a Stellar Companion to the Sun (1986)
- Doctoral advisor: Richard A. Muller

Saul Perlmutter (born September 22, 1959) is an American astrophysicist who is a professor of physics at the University of California, Berkeley, where he holds the Franklin W. and Karen Weber Dabby Chair, and is head of the International Supernova Cosmology Project at the Lawrence Berkeley National Laboratory. He is a member of both the American Academy of Arts & Sciences and the American Philosophical Society, and was elected a Fellow of the American Association for the Advancement of Science in 2003. He is a member of the National Academy of Sciences. Perlmutter shared the 2006 Shaw Prize in Astronomy, the 2011 Nobel Prize in Physics, and the 2015 Breakthrough Prize in Fundamental Physics with Brian P. Schmidt and Adam Riess for providing evidence that the expansion of the universe is accelerating. Since 2021, he has been a member of the President’s Council of Advisors on Science and Technology (PCAST).

== Education ==
Saul Perlmutter was born to Felice (Feige) D. Perlmutter (née Davidson), now professor emerita of the Temple University School of Social Administration, and Daniel D. Perlmutter, now professor emeritus of chemical and biomolecular engineering at the University of Pennsylvania. His maternal grandfather, the Yiddish teacher Samuel Davidson (1903–1989), emigrated from the Bessarabian town of Floreşti to Canada in 1919 and then with his wife Chaika Newman to New York.

Perlmutter spent his childhood in the Mount Airy neighborhood of Philadelphia. He went to Quaker schools in nearby Germantown; first Greene Street Friends School for the elementary grades, followed by Germantown Friends School for grades seven through twelve. He graduated with an AB in physics from Harvard magna cum laude in 1981 and received his PhD in physics from Berkeley in 1986. Perlmutter's PhD thesis, entitled "An Astrometric Search for a Stellar Companion to the Sun" and supervised by Richard A. Muller, described the development and use of an automated telescope to search for Nemesis candidates. At the same time, he was using this telescope to search for Nemesis and supernovae, which would lead him to his award-winning work in cosmology. Perlmutter attributes the idea for an automated supernova search to Luis Alvarez, a 1968 Nobel laureate, who shared his idea with Perlmutter's research adviser.

== Work ==
Perlmutter heads the Supernova Cosmology Project at Lawrence Berkeley National Laboratory. It was this team along with the competing High-z Supernova Search Team led by Riess and Schmidt, which found evidence of the accelerating expansion of the universe based on observing Type Ia supernova in the distant universe. Type Ia supernova occurs whenever a white dwarf star gains enough additional mass to pass above the Chandrasekhar limit, usually by stealing additional mass from a companion star. Since all Type Ia supernovae are believed to occur in essentially the same way, they form a standard candle whose intrinsic luminosity can be assumed to be approximately the same in all cases. By measuring the apparent luminosity of the explosion from Earth, researchers can then infer the distance to supernova. Comparing this inferred distance to the apparent redshift of the explosion allows the observer to measure both the distance and relative velocity of the supernova.

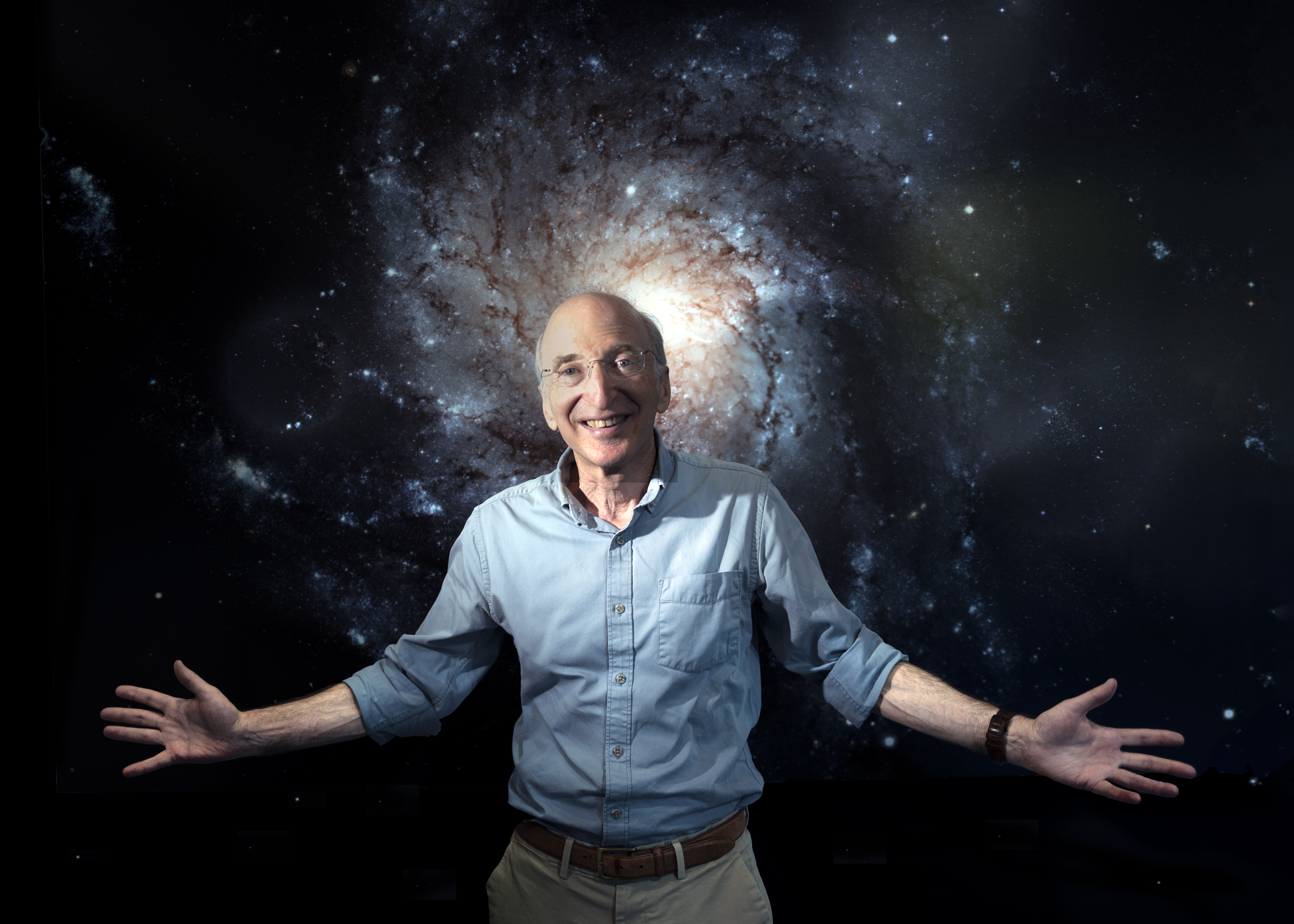
Perlmutter in 2024

The Supernova Cosmology Project concluded that these distant supernovae were receding more quickly than would be expected due to the Hubble expansion alone, and, by inference, the expansion of the universe must have been accelerated over the billions of years since the supernovae occurred. The High-z Team also came to a similar conclusion. The two teams' reports were published within weeks of each other, and their conclusions were readily accepted by the scientific community due to corroborating theories. This conclusion has subsequently been supported by other lines of evidence. These findings reinvigorated research into the nature of the universe, and especially into the role of dark energy. For this work Perlmutter was awarded the 2011 Nobel Prize in Physics, shared jointly with Riess and Schmidt.

Perlmutter is a lead investigator in the Supernova/Acceleration Probe project, which aims to build a satellite dedicated to finding and studying more supernovae in the distant universe. The goal is to more precisely determine the rate at which the universe has been accelerating. He is also a participant in the Berkeley Earth Surface Temperature project, which aims to increase our understanding of recent global warming through improved analyses of climate data.

Perlmutter is a professor and currently teaches at UC Berkeley.

== Awards and recognition ==
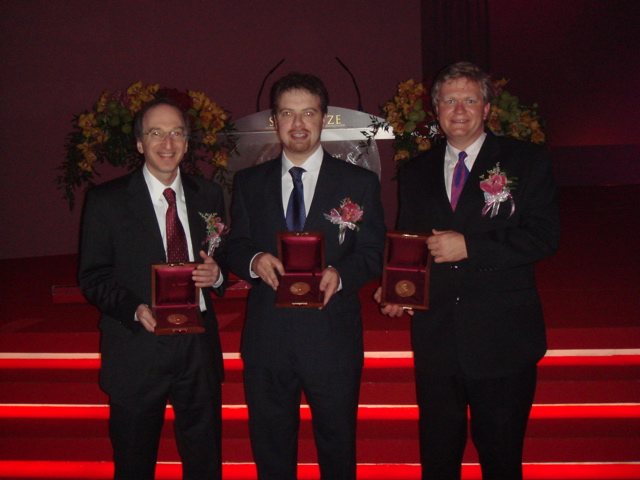
Perlmutter, Adam Riess, and Brian P. Schmidt after being awarded the 2006 Shaw Prize in Astronomy - the same astronomers would be awarded the Nobel Prize in Physics in 2011

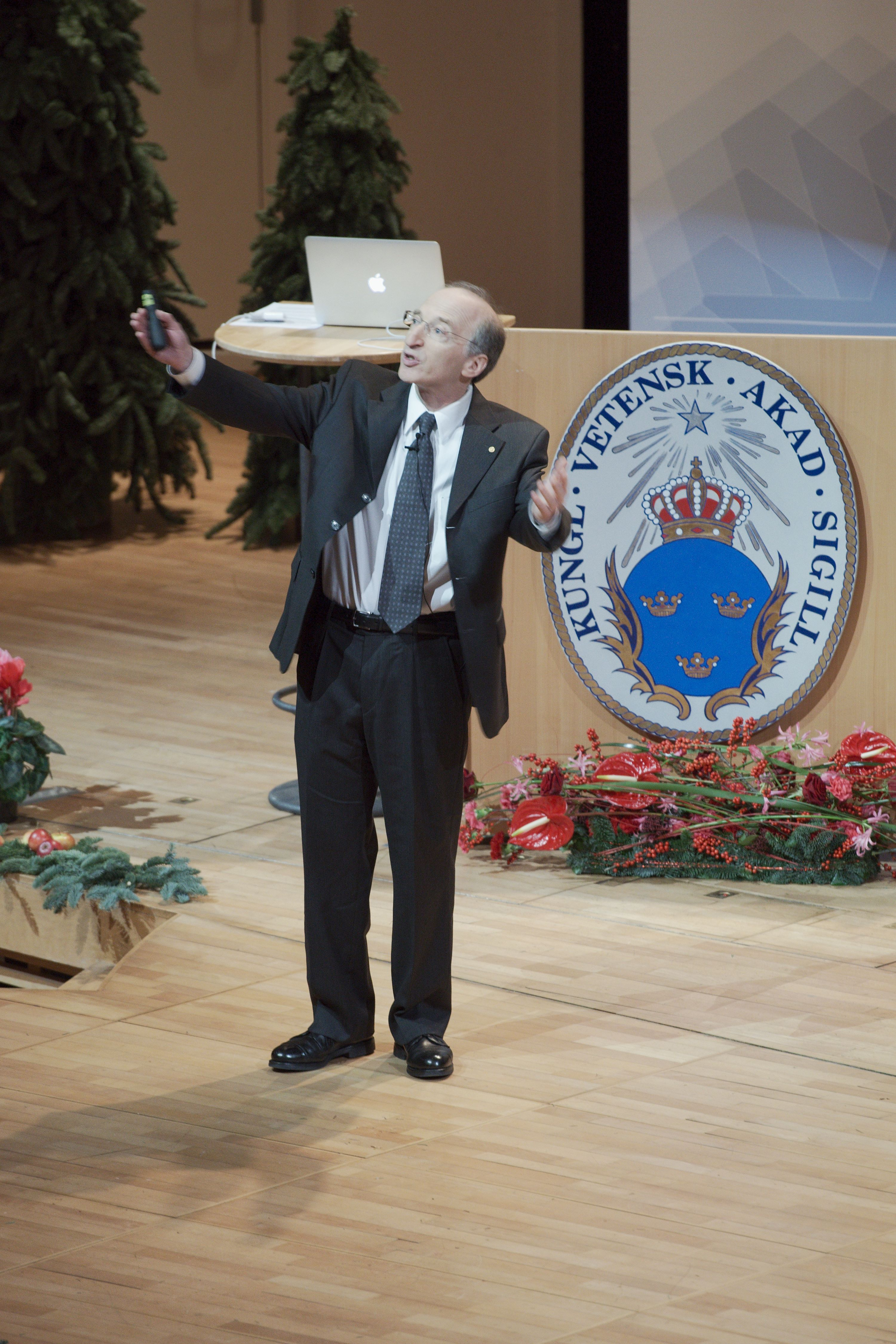
Perlmutter presenting his Nobel lecture at Aula Magna

In 2002, Perlmutter won the Department of Energy's E. O. Lawrence Award in Physics. In 2003, he was awarded the California Scientist of the Year Award, and, in 2005, he won the John Scott Award and the Padua Prize. In 2006, he shared the Shaw Prize in Astronomy with Adam Riess and Brian P. Schmidt. The same year, Perlmutter won the Antonio Feltrinelli International Prize.

Perlmutter and his team shared the 2007 Gruber Cosmology Prize (a $500,000 award) with Schmidt and the High-Z Team for discovering the accelerating expansion of the universe. In 2010, Perlmutter was named a Miller Senior Fellow of the Miller Institute at the University of California Berkeley. In 2011, Perlmutter and Riess were named co-recipients of the Albert Einstein Medal.

Perlmutter shared the 2011 Nobel Prize in Physics with Riess and Schmidt. The Nobel Prize includes a SEK 10 million cash award (approximately US$1.5 million). Perlmutter received one-half of the cash prize, while Riess and Schmidt shared the other half.

In 2014, Perlmutter received the Golden Plate Award of the American Academy of Achievement.

Perlmutter, Schmidt, Riess, and their teams shared the 2015 Breakthrough Prize in Fundamental Physics with $3 million to be split among them.

A United States Department of Energy 2020 supercomputer is named Perlmutter in his honor.

== Family ==
Perlmutter is married to Laura Nelson, an anthropologist at University of California, Berkeley, and they have one daughter, Noa. Perlmutter has two sisters: Shira Perlmutter (b. 1956), an attorney, law professor, and the fourteenth Register of Copyrights, and Tova Perlmutter (b. 1967), a nonprofit executive.

== Popular culture ==
Reference to Saul Perlmutter was made on the CBS television comedy series The Big Bang Theory during the 2011 episodes "The Speckerman Recurrence" and "The Rhinitis Revelation". In these episodes, the lead character Sheldon Cooper, who aspires to win a Nobel Prize himself, jealously berates Perlmutter and questions the decision to award Perlmutter a Nobel Prize.

== Technical reports and conference/event proceedings ==
- Perlmutter, S., et al. "Progress Report on the Berkeley/Anglo-Australian Observatory High-redshift Supernova Search", Lawrence Berkeley National Laboratory, (November 1990).
- Perlmutter, S., et al. "Discovery of the Most Distant Supernovae and the Quest for {Omega}", Lawrence Berkeley National Laboratory, (May 1994).
- Perlmutter, S., et al. "Discovery of a Supernova Explosion at Half the Age of the Universe and its Cosmological Implications", Lawrence Berkeley National Laboratory, (December 16, 1997).
- Perlmutter, S., et al. "The Distant Type Ia Supernova Rate", Lawrence Berkeley National Laboratory, (May 28, 2002).
- Perlmutter, S., et al. "The Supernova Legacy Survey: Measurement of Omega_M, Omega_Lambda, and w from the First Year Data Set", Lawrence Berkeley National Laboratory, (October 14, 2005).
- Perlmutter, S. "Supernovae, Dark Energy and the Accelerating Universe: How DOE Helped to Win (yet another) Nobel Prize", Lawrence Berkeley National Laboratory, (January 13, 2012).

== See also ==
- Cosmological constant
- Dark energy
- Dark matter

Awards and achievements
Preceded by Konstantin Novoselov and Andre Geim	Winner of the Nobel Prize in Physics with Adam Riess and Brian Schmidt; 2011	Succeeded by Serge Haroche and David J. Wineland
