= Sidney A. Wallace =

American naval admiral (1927–2026)

Sidney Arthur Wallace (October 16, 1927 – January 9, 2026) was an American rear admiral in the United States Coast Guard, and an attorney.

== Biography ==
Wallace was born on October 16, 1927, in Alcoa, Tennessee, to Albert Victor Wallace and Amy Williams Wallace.

He graduated from Baylor School in Chattanooga, Tennessee, in 1945; the George Washington University Law School, in 1968; and Auburn University, in 1969.

Wallace married Jacqueline Theis of Islip, New York. The couple had two children.

He died on January 9, 2026 at his home in Reston, Virginia, at the age of 98, with internment at Arlington National Cemetery taking place April 27th. Wallace is survived by his wife and one son, Evan, and was predeceased by another son, Wesley.

== Career ==
Wallace graduated from the United States Coast Guard Academy in 1949. He was then assigned to the USCGC Mendota (WHEC-69) and the USCGC Finch (WDE-428).

After completing flight training, Wallace became a search and rescue pilot at Coast Guard Air Station San Francisco in 1953. He would later be stationed at Coast Guard Air Station Kodiak, Coast Guard Air Station Elizabeth City and Naval Air Station Barbers Point.

In 1968, Wallace enrolled at the Air War College. After graduating the following year, he assumed command of Coast Guard Air Station New Orleans.

From 1975 to 1977, Wallace was Chief of Public and International Affairs. He then became the first executive director of the Maritime Safety Task Force in the Office of the United States Secretary of Transportation. In December 1978, he retired from the Coast Guard, accepting a position as Counsel to the Committee on Merchant Marine and Fisheries, then under the jurisdiction of the U.S. House of Representatives.

Awards received during his naval career include the Meritorious Service Medal, the Coast Guard Commendation Medal, the World War II Victory Medal and the National Defense Service Medal.

Wallace left Capitol Hill in 1981 to join Dyer, Ellis, & Joseph, where he practiced as the firm's own counsel for 19 years, continuing as of counsel after it merged into Blank Rome.
