= Hayyim Perlmutter =

Ḥayyim ben Zebulon Jacob Perlmutter (Hebrew: חיים בן זבולון יעקב פרלמוטר; fl. 18th century) was a rabbi in Ostropol, Russian Empire.

Perlmutter authored Elef ʿOmer (Grodno, 1795), a collection of sayings with the Hebrew letter "aleph," based on Beḥinat ʿOlam by Jedaiah Bedersi. He also wrote Shirah le-Ḥayyim (Warsaw, 1814; 2d ed., Vienna, 1847), a collection of azharot corresponding to the 613 commandments. Each verse begins with a word from the second song of Moses (Deuteronomy 32:1–43). It includes an index to the Biblical passages and a commentary titled Yakhin u-Boʿaz.
