= Steve Castor =

American attorney

Stephen Castor
- Born: 1972 or 1973 (age 52–53)
- Education: Pennsylvania State University (BS); Lehigh University (MBA); George Washington University (JD)
- Occupation: Attorney

Stephen R. Castor is an American trial attorney who served as minority counsel in the impeachment inquiry against Donald Trump. Castor has been a congressional staff member in the House Oversight Committee since 2004.

== Early life ==
Castor received his bachelor's degree in business logistics from Pennsylvania State University in 1995 and in 1998 he received a master of business administration degree from Lehigh University. He subsequently received his JD degree from George Washington University Law School.

== Career ==
Castor began his career as a litigator in commercial law at the law firm Blank Rome in Philadelphia and Washington, D.C. He is a contributor on the Federalist Society website. Castor has been a congressional staff member in the House Oversight Committee since 2005. He has served as a congressional staffer for a total of seven committee chairmen, including four Republicans. He was transferred to the Intelligence Committee along with Representative Jim Jordan who joined the committee before the beginning of the impeachment inquiry against Donald Trump.

In early November 2019, Castor was appointed as minority counsel in the impeachment inquiry, conducting questioning of witnesses on behalf of Republican members of the Intelligence Committee. During the impeachment, Castor carried his legal briefs in a grocery bag. His cousin, Bruce Castor, represented Donald Trump at his second impeachment.

== See also ==
- Dan Goldman, majority counsel in the impeachment inquiry
