= Shira Perlmutter =

US Register of Copyrights 2020-2025

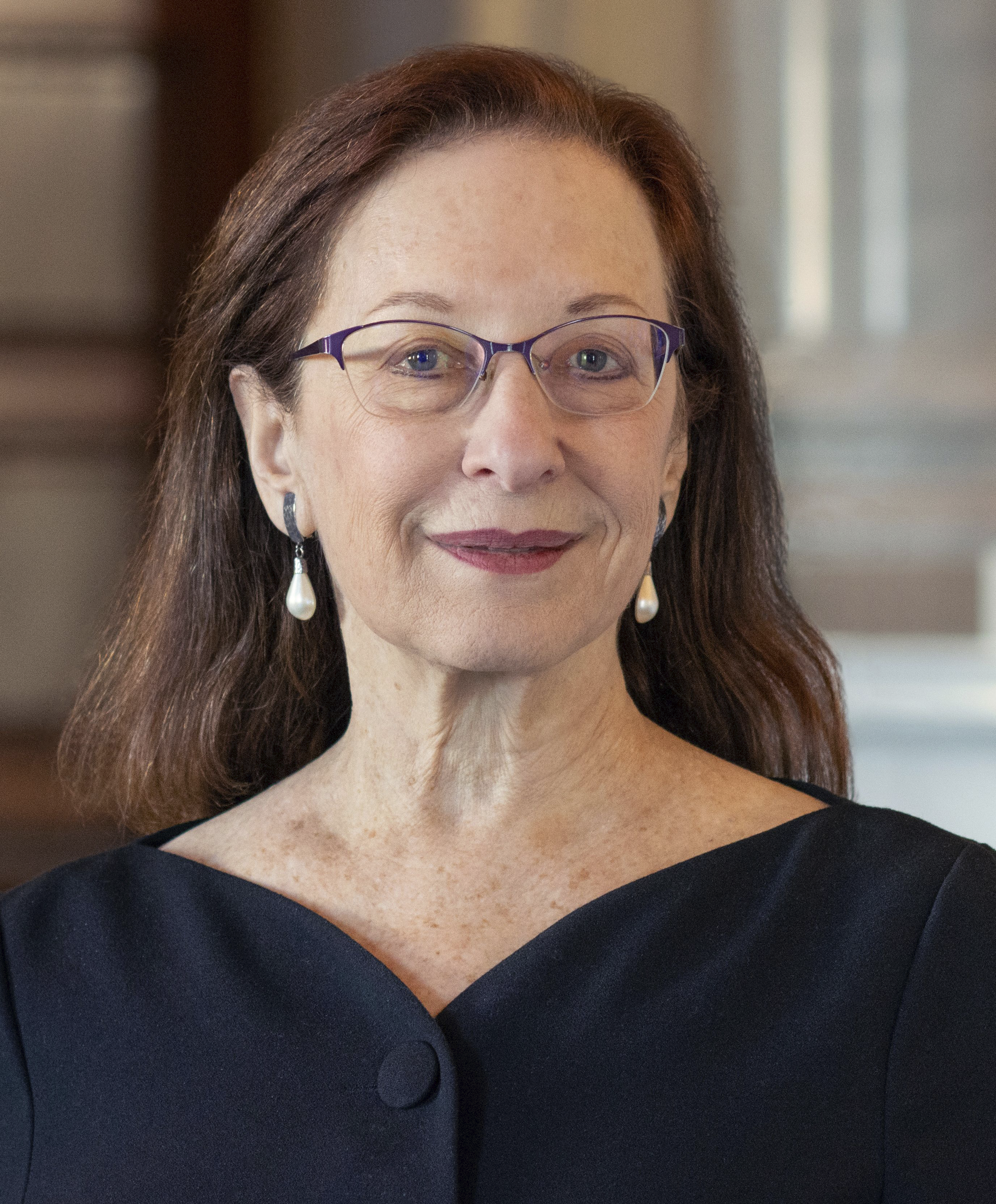

14th Register of Copyrights
- Disputed
- Assumed office October 25, 2020; Disputed with Paul Perkins (Note: She has challenged her dismissal by President Donald Trump in a lawsuit.)
- Appointed by: Carla Hayden
- Preceded by: Maria Strong (acting)

Personal details
- Born: 1956 (age 69–70)
- Relatives: Saul Perlmutter (brother)
- Education: Harvard University (AB); University of Pennsylvania (JD)

Shira Perlmutter (born 1956) is an American attorney and law professor who has served as the 14th register of copyrights of the United States Copyright Office in the Library of Congress, since 2020. (Note: As of November 26, 2025, Perlmutter is still listed as the Register by the Copyright Office website after President Donald Trump ordered her to be replaced by an associate deputy attorney general, Paul Perkins. However, this is an ongoing issue that is not resolved after congressional intervention and pending federal litigation. Perlmutter and Librarian of Congress Carla Hayden were fired by Trump as part of Trump's ongoing efforts to replace large portions of the federal government.) Before her appointment as register in 2020, Perlmutter led copyright and global law policy at the United States Patent and Trademark Office. In 1995, she was appointed to be the first associate register for policy and international affairs at the Copyright Office and was the copyright consultant for the Clinton administration's advisory council on the National Information Infrastructure from 1994 to 1995.

In the private sector, Perlmutter was the executive vice president of policy and international affairs at the International Federation of the Phonographic Industry, a music industry association representing recording studios. Prior to that, she was associate general counsel and vice president for intellectual property at Time Warner. Prior to her notable roles, she practiced law at the Paul, Weiss law firm in New York where she practiced commercial litigation.

As an academic, she is a research fellow of the University of Oxford Intellectual Property Research Centre. From 1990 until 1995, she was a professor of law at the Catholic University of America teaching copyright, trademark, unfair competition, and international intellectual property law. Aside from academic journals articles and government reports, Perlmutter is the coauthor of a leading law school casebook on international intellectual property law and policy.

Both in public lecture and in her academic writing, Perlmutter says the American people desire copyright laws that make sense, are fair, and reflect technology currently in use. She argues that the failure of law to adapt quickly to technological change causes disruption to trade, inefficiencies, among other negative effects.

== Early life and education ==
Shira Perlmutter was born in 1956 to Felice Davidson Perlmutter and Daniel Perlmutter. Her mother was a professor at Temple University in social work, nonprofit management, and social policy and her father was a professor of chemical and biomolecular engineering at the University of Pennsylvania. Her maternal grandfather, Samuel Davidson (1903–1989), emigrated from the Bessarabian town of Floreşti to Canada in 1919 and then, with her grandmother, Chaika Newman, to New York.

Perlmutter and her two siblings, Tova and Saul, were raised in the Mount Airy neighborhood of Philadelphia and educated at Quaker schools. Her brother, Saul Perlmutter, received the Nobel Prize in physics along with two others in 2011 for their discovery that that the universe's expansion is accelerating.

Perlmutter is a graduate of Harvard University, which awarded her an A.B. degree in linguistics. She earned her J. D. degree from the University of Pennsylvania Law School.

== Disputed dismissal ==
In September 2020, Perlmutter was appointed to head the United States Copyright Office by the librarian of Congress, who is the official overseeing that office since the creation in 1897. On May 10, 2025, Perlmutter was fired by order of the Trump administration.

The firing came one day after Perlmutter and her office issued a lengthy report about artificial intelligence, in which they criticized fair use arguments that support the use of copyright material to train generative AI as conceptualized under the Copyright Act (17 U.S.C.) or existing case law, as claimed by those representing AI development firms, including Elon Musk's company xAI.

Perlmutter sued to dispute the legality of the dismissal, as the register is appointed by, and responsible to, the librarian of Congress.

Congressman Joe Morelle criticized the firing, speculating that Perlmutter was fired because "she refused to rubber-stamp Elon Musk's efforts to mine troves of [copyright] works to train AI models". Other members of Congress, both Republican and Democratic, have pushed back at the Trump administration about its authority to take control of Congress' establishments.

Earlier in the same week as the Perlmutter dismissal, the official who appointed Perlmutter to the office within the library, Librarian of Congress Carla Hayden, had been fired abruptly and without explanation by Trump, drawing similar criticism. The Perlmutter lawsuit followed soon thereafter.

On September 10, 2025, a divided three-judge panel of the United States Court of Appeals for the District of Columbia Circuit ruled that Perlmutter is entitled to continue to serve as the register of copyrights at the Library of Congress, despite the White House's claim that Trump had fired her, "because Perlmutter leads an agency that is housed in the Legislative Branch and her primary role is to advise Congress."

On November 26, 2025, the Supreme Court formally deferred ruling on the Trump administration's request that this decision be stayed, thus allowing Perlmutter to remain serving. The decision on the stay was deferred while the Supreme Court considered the cases regarding the firings of Lisa Cook from the Federal Reserve and Rebecca Slaughter from the Federal Trade Commission. On June 30, 2026 the Supreme Court refused to issue a stay, leaving intact an order from the U.S. Court of Appeals for the District of Columbia Circuit which had restored her to her role while the litigation plays out.
