= Register of Copyrights =

Director of the United States Copyright Office

- Incumbent; Vacant
- United States Copyright Office
- Appointer: Librarian of Congress
- Constituting instrument: 17 U.S.C. § 701
- Inaugural holder: Thorvald Solberg
- Formation: 1897
- Salary: governed by 5 U.S.C. § 5314
- Website: copyright.gov

The register of copyrights is the director of the United States Copyright Office within the Library of Congress, as provided by 17 U.S.C. § 701. The office has been headed by a register since 1897. The register is appointed by, and responsible to, the librarian of Congress, with the register's office located in the library's James Madison Memorial Building.

Although the title suggests a clerical role, registers of copyrights have been responsible for creating the procedures and practices of the Copyright Office and establishing standards for registration of copyright. They have increasingly been responsible for setting or influencing United States copyright policy. Today, the register is responsible for administering rulemaking procedures and producing authoritative interpretations of some aspects of U.S. copyright law, as well as advising the librarian of Congress on the triennial proceeding on exceptions to the anticircumvention rules of the Digital Millennium Copyright Act. The register also routinely testifies before Congress on copyright policy matters.

As of May 2025, the position is vacant. It was recently held by Shira Perlmutter, who took office October 25, 2020. Perlmutter has filed a lawsuit against unauthorized firing by the president because the chain of command for the position rests only with the librarian of Congress (who is authorized to appoint the registrar to a maximum term of ten years). Although the Senate never voted to make a change regarding this, in April 2017, the House of Representatives had voted to propose changing the register of copyrights to a position that is filled by presidential appointment with Senate confirmation. That never was voted upon by the Senate, so the existing policy remains as has been in place since the establishment of the Copyright Office.

On September 10, 2025, a divided three-judge panel of the United States Court of Appeals for the District of Columbia Circuit ruled that Perlmutter is entitled to continue to serve as the register of copyrights at the Library of Congress, despite the White House's claim that Trump had fired her, "because Perlmutter leads an agency that is housed in the legislative branch and her primary role is to advise Congress."

== List of registers of copyrights ==
The following persons have served as the register of copyrights:

| No. | Image | Registers | Start of term | End of term | Length of term | Refs |
|---|---|---|---|---|---|---|
| 1 | | Thorvald Solberg | July 1, 1897 | April 21, 1930 | 11,961 days | |
| Acting | | William Lincoln Brown | April 22, 1930 | June 4, 1934 | 1,505 days | |
| 2 | | William Lincoln Brown | June 4, 1934 | July 1, 1936 | 759 days | |
| 3 | | Clement Lincoln Bouvé | August 1, 1936 | December 31, 1943 | 2,699 days | |
| Acting | | Richard Crosby De Wolf | January 1, 1944 | February 1, 1945 | 398 days | |
| 4 | | Sam Bass Warner | February 1, 1945 | May 28, 1951 | 2,308 days | |
| Acting | | Arthur Fisher | May 28, 1951 | September 12, 1951 | 108 days | |
| 5 | | Arthur Fisher | September 12, 1951 | November 12, 1960 (Note: Died in office) | 3,350 days | |
| Acting | | Abraham L. Kaminstein | November 13, 1960 | December 23, 1960 | 41 days | |
| 6 | | Abraham L. Kaminstein | December 24, 1960 | August 31, 1971 | 3,903 days | |
| 7 | | George D. Cary | September 1, 1971 | March 9, 1973 | 556 days | |
| Acting | | Abe Goldman | March 10, 1973 | November 19, 1973 | 255 days | |
| 8 | | Barbara Ringer (Note: First female Register. Ringer brought a sex discrimination suit that resulted in her being named to the position.) | November 19, 1973 | May 30, 1980 | 2,385 days | |
| 9 | | David Ladd | June 2, 1980 | January 2, 1985 | 1,676 days | |
| Acting | | Donald Curran | January 3, 1985 | September 10, 1985 | 251 days | |
| 10 | | Ralph Oman | September 23, 1985 | January 8, 1994 | 3,031 days | |
| Acting | | Barbara Ringer | November 27, 1993 | August 6, 1994 | 253 days | |
| 11 | | Marybeth Peters | August 7, 1994 | December 31, 2010 | 5,991 days | |
| Acting | | Maria Pallante | January 1, 2011 | May 31, 2011 | 151 days | |
| 12 | | Maria Pallante | June 1, 2011 | October 21, 2016 | 1,970 days | |
| Acting | | Karyn Temple | October 21, 2016 | March 26, 2019 | 887 days | |
| 13 | | Karyn Temple | March 27, 2019 | January 4, 2020 | 284 days | |
| Acting | | Maria Strong | January 5, 2020 | October 24, 2020 | 294 days | |
| 14 | | Shira Perlmutter | October 25, 2020 | May 10, 2025 (Note: Legality of Perlmutter's dismissal by president is disputed) | 1,807 days | |

Table notes:

== Sources ==
- "Congressional Testimony by Register of Copyrights". United States Copyright Office.
- "Registers of Copyrights". United States Copyright Office.
- United States Code. 17 U.S.C. § 701.
