= United States Copyright Office =

Government body in the United States

Agency overview
- Formed: July 8, 1870; 156 years ago
- Jurisdiction: Federal government of the United States
- Headquarters: Washington, D.C.
- Agency executive: Shira Perlmutter (Disputed), Register of Copyrights
- Parent agency: Library of Congress
- Website: copyright.gov

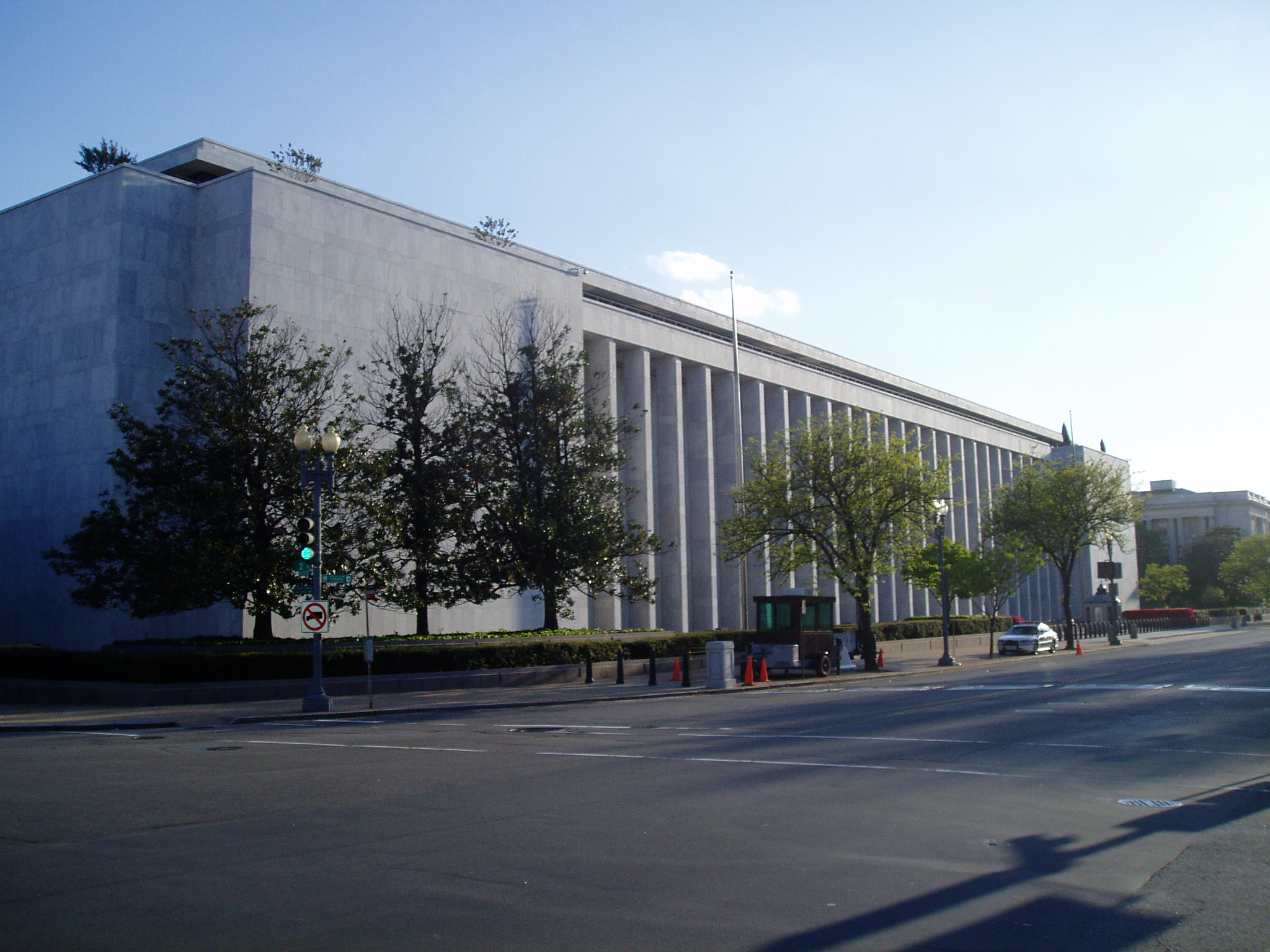
The James Madison Memorial Building, which houses the office

The United States Copyright Office (USCO), a part of the United States Library of Congress, is a United States government body that registers copyright claims, records information about copyright ownership, provides information to the public, and assists Congress and other parts of the government on a wide range of copyright issues. It maintains online records of copyright registration and recorded documents within the copyright catalog, which is used by copyright title researchers who are attempting to clear a chain of title for copyrighted works.

The register of copyrights heads the Copyright Office. There is currently a dispute over who the register is. Shira Perlmutter, the 14th register, began serving from October 26, 2020. On May 10, 2025, President Donald Trump claimed to have fired Perlmutter to replace her with Paul Perkins as acting register. However, the register is an employee of Congress, not of the executive branch. Perlmutter's claim to the role has been endorsed by courts.

The Copyright Office is located in the James Madison Memorial Building of the Library of Congress, at 101 Independence Avenue SE, in Washington, DC. While open to the general public, appointments must be made to visit the Public Information Office and Copyright Public Records Reading Room.

== History ==
The United States Constitution provides for establishing a system of extensive copyright laws in the United States. The first federal copyright law, the Copyright Act of 1790, was enacted on May 31, 1790, and covered only books, maps, and charts. Claims were originally recorded by Clerks of U.S. district courts. On June 9, 1790, the U.S. District Court of Pennsylvania registered the first work, the Philadelphia Spelling Book by John Barry.

In 1870, copyright functions were centralized in the Library of Congress under the direction of the then Librarian of Congress, Ainsworth Rand Spofford. Between 1870 and 1897, the Librarian of Congress also served as the head of the Copyright Office. The Copyright Office became a separate department of the Library of Congress on February 19, 1897, and Thorvald Solberg was appointed the first register of copyrights on July 22, 1897.

The 1909 Copyright Act was signed into law by President Theodore Roosevelt on March 4, 1909, which expanded protection to additional types of works.

In the 1930s, the Copyright Office moved from its location in the Thomas Jefferson Building to new quarters in what is now the John Adams Building and in the 1970s it moved again, to its present quarters in the James Madison Memorial Building.

On October 19, 1976, President Gerald R. Ford signed into law the Copyright Act of 1976, which became effective on January 1, 1978. This law lengthened the duration of copyright protection and again expanded the types of works that were covered, and with amendments made since then, is the current copyright law in effect.

== Functions ==
The main function of the Copyright Office is to administer and sustain an effective national copyright system. Though the functions of the Copyright Office have grown to include the following:

=== Administering the Copyright Law ===
The Copyright Office examines all applications and deposits presented for registration of new and original and renewal of old copyright claims to determine their acceptability for registration under the provisions of the copyright law. The Office also records documents related to copyright ownership. However, the Copyright Act of 1976 made registration largely optional for copyright ownership. Under the 1976 Act, federal copyright requires only a fixation of an original work of authorship in a tangible medium of expression. Renewal is not compulsory, and a copyright owner can register at any time. The 1976 Act makes registration (or refusal of registration) a requisite for an infringement action.

The Copyright Office records the bibliographic descriptions and the copyright facts of all works registered. The archives maintained by the Copyright Office are an important record of America's cultural and historical heritage. Containing nearly 45 million individual cards, the Copyright Card Catalog situated in the James Madison Memorial Building is an index to all the copyright registrations in the United States starting from 1870 up to 1977. Records after 1977 are maintained through an online database containing more than 16 million entries.

As a service unit of the Library of Congress, the Copyright Office is part of the legislative branch of the government, and provides copyright policy advice to the Congress. At the request of the Congress, the Copyright Office advises and assists the Congress in the development of national and international copyright policy; drafts legislation; and prepares technical studies on copyright-related matters.

The Compendium of U.S. Copyright Office Practices manual documents the Copyright Office's practices in its administration of copyright law.

A new fee schedule for Copyright Office services was made effective from March 20, 2020 onwards. Before that, the Copyright office's fees were last updated in 2014. The revised fees increased only for certain registration and recording services, along with some associated services, while other services did not see a fee increase. In May 2014, the Office had reduced some renewal application and addendum fees in an effort to "encourage the filing of more renewal claims" and thereby help improve public records about copyright ownership. In 2020, the fees for a renewal application were increased while the addendum fee remains the same.

=== Providing Information Services to the Public ===
This 2019 video from the Copyright Office explains the value of a public domain and why copyright matters. Public outreach is part of the mandate of the agency.

The Copyright Office provides public information and reference services concerning copyrights and recorded documents. Updates and information regarding developments in the Copyright Office are available through the U.S. Copyright Office NewsNet.

The official website offers information about new copyright relevant legislation, a list of designated agents under the Digital Millennium Copyright Act (DMCA) and the Online Copyright Infringement Liability Limitation Act (OCILLA), and information about the Copyright Royalty Board (CRB), which established a separate website in 2017.

=== Acquiring Mandatory Deposits for the Library of Congress ===
In 1870, Congress passed a law that centralized the copyright system in the Library of Congress. This law required all owners of copyrights of publicly distributed works to deposit in the Library two copies of every such work registered in the United States. Supplying the information needs of the Congress, the Library of Congress has become the world's largest library and the de facto national library of the United States. This repository of more than 162 million books, photographs, maps, films, documents, sound recordings, computer programs, and other items has grown largely through the operations of the copyright system, which brings deposits of every copyrighted work into the Library.

On August 29, 2023, the United States Court of Appeals for the District of Columbia Circuit ruled in Valancourt Books v. Garland that the Copyright Office could no longer demand copies of published works under section 407 of the Copyright Act of 1976, which previously allowed the Office to demand 2 copies of any work published in the United States. It deemed this section unconstitutional under the "takings clause" of the Constitution. This did not affect the Office's ability to collect deposit material through other sections of the copyright law, namely through the deposit requirement associated with copyright registration or through voluntary submission of copies through the Office.

=== Duties ===
The Copyright Office consults with interested copyright owners, industry and library representatives, bar associations, and other interested parties on issues related to the copyright law.

The Copyright Office promotes improved copyright protection for U.S. creative works abroad through its International Copyright Institute. Created within the Copyright Office by Congress in 1988, the International Copyright Institute provides training for high-level officials from developing and newly industrialized countries and encourages development of effective intellectual property laws and enforcement overseas.

== See also ==
- Copyright Catalog
