= George Watterston =

American librarian and 3rd Librarian of Congress

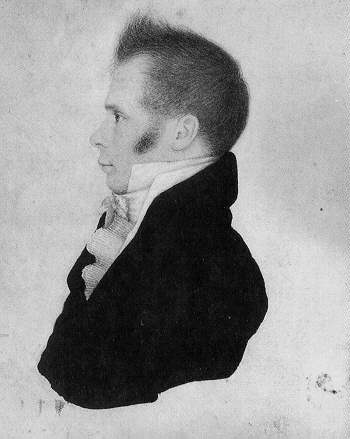

Librarian of Congress
- In office March 21, 1815 – May 28, 1829
- President: James Madison; James Monroe; John Quincy Adams
- Preceded by: Patrick Magruder
- Succeeded by: John Silva Meehan

Personal details
- Born: October 23, 1783 New York Harbor, New York, U.S.
- Died: February 4, 1854 (aged 70)
- Resting place: Congressional Cemetery

George Watterston (October 23, 1783 – February 4, 1854) was an American attorney and writer who was the third Librarian of the United States Congress from 1815 to 1829.

== Early life and education ==
Watterston, the son of a builder from Jedburgh, Scotland, was born on board a ship in New York Harbor. When Watterston was eight, his family moved to Washington D.C., where his father worked to help build the new national capital city. Watterston received a private education and graduated from the Charlotte Hall Military Academy in St. Mary's County, Maryland.

== Career ==
Watterston became a lawyer, and at first practiced in Hagerstown, Maryland. However, he grew dissatisfied with then-frontier life and moved back to Washington, D.C., where he partnered with Thomas Law. There, Watterson became a man of letters, publishing his first novel, The Lawyer, or Man As He Ought Not to Be, in 1808. He also published the novel Glencarn; or The Disappointments of Youth (1810); a play, The Child of Feeling (1809); and a poem, The Scenes of Youth (1813). Many of his works portrayed lawyers in unflattering terms. In 1813, Waterston became editor of the Washington City Gazette.

During the War of 1812, Watterston participated in the unsuccessful defense of the national capitol. The British burned the city, including the Library of Congress, which was then housed in the Capitol building. After war's end, President James Madison appointed Watterston as Librarian of Congress, the third person to hold the position and the first with that as his sole responsibility. (Previous librarians also served as the clerk of the House of Representatives). Congress replenished the library by purchasing the collection of former President Thomas Jefferson. Watterston gave the collection's books bookplates and labels and kept them organized according to Jefferson's basic classification scheme. He also continued writing, including the comic novel The L— Family at Washington; or, A Winter in the Metropolis (1822), A Course of Study preparatory to the Bar or Senate (1827) and The Wanderer in Washington (1827).

Watterston was a Whig and active in politics. He opposed the election of President Andrew Jackson and upon Jackson's election was replaced in 1829. Watterston fruitlessly sought reinstatement for years.

After his dismissal, Watterston became editor of the National Journal and published books on many subjects, including biographies and works on agriculture. He campaigned to construct the Washington Monument and became secretary of the Washington National Monument Society.

== Personal life ==
In 1811 Watterson married Maria Magruder Shanley (1795-1864), whose grandfather Capt. Nathaniel Magruder (d. 1785) had been a prominent patriot during the American Revolutionary War. Of their children, two sons died in 1832 but two sons and two daughters survived to adulthood, including their first born, David (who became a civil engineer in the capital city) and their youngest George W. Watterson (1848-1864). In 1820, Watterston owned four enslaved people, but only one in 1830 (a woman in her 30s, and a free black man of similar age also lived with the family). Ten years later, Watterston owned five slaves (all under age 25), and in the final census before his death, owned one 18-year old black woman and a young girl.

== Death and legacy ==
Watterston died in 1854, and was buried in the Congressional Cemetery in Washington, D.C., where his widow would join him a decade later. Their youngest son George would move to Livingston County, Louisiana, buy land in 1860, and enlist in the Confederate States Army as a private in Louisiana's Washington artillery as the American Civil War began. He died in 1864 of complications of wounds received shortly after the Battle of Gettysburg, although having left progeny.

Watterston's former house in Washington, D.C., still exists, as a contributing structure in the historic district near the Library of Congress.

== Additional sources ==
- John Y. Cole (March 30, 2006). "Jefferson's Legacy: A Brief History of the Library of Congress -- Librarians of Congress". Library of Congress.
