= John Silva Meehan =

American publisher (1790–1863)

John Meehan
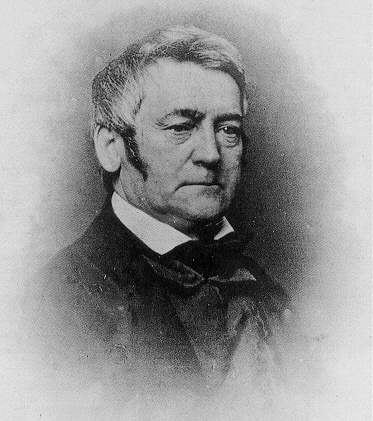

Librarian of Congress
- In office May 28, 1829 – May 24, 1861
- President: List: Andrew Jackson; Martin Van Buren; William Henry Harrison; John Tyler; James K. Polk; Zachary Taylor; Millard Fillmore; Franklin Pierce; James Buchanan; Abraham Lincoln
- Preceded by: George Watterston
- Succeeded by: John Gould Stephenson

Personal details
- Born: John Silva Meehan; February 6, 1790 New York City, U.S.
- Died: April 24, 1863 (aged 73) Washington, D.C., U.S.
- Party: Jacksonian (1825–1828); Democratic (1828–1863)
- Spouse: Margaret Jones Monington
- Children: 7

Military service
- Allegiance: United States
- Branch/service: United States Navy
- Years of service: 1815
- Rank: Midshipman
- Battles/wars: War of 1812

John Silva Meehan (February 6, 1790 – April 24, 1863) was an American publisher, printer, and newspaper editor. He served as the librarian of Congress from 1829 to 1861.

Born in New York City, Meehan worked as a printer in his youth. He briefly served in the U.S. Navy during the last few months of the War of 1812. He returned without seeing combat and began work as a publisher in Philadelphia alongside fellow printer Robert Anderson, publishing a Baptist religious journal. After the firm moved to Washington, D.C., in early 1822, Meehan began editing and publishing the Baptist weekly newspaper The Columbian Star. Leaving the Star in late 1825, Meehan nominally purchased the City of Washington Gazette on direction from Andrew Jackson's presidential campaign, renaming the paper the United States' Telegraph and taking an immensely partisan stance. Jackson supporters considered Meehan unable to properly spearhead the press campaign. Control over the paper gradually shifted towards editor and publisher Duff Green, with Meehan officially leaving the paper in October 1826; however, he continued to serve as Green's editorial assistant until 1829.

Following a purge of numerous incumbent officials in the aftermath of Jackson's 1828 election, Meehan was appointed as librarian of Congress via the spoils system and with Green's urging, replacing the staunch anti-Jacksonian George Watterston. Meehan's tenure as librarian saw the steady growth of the Library of Congress, collaborating with longstanding Joint Committee on the Library chair James Pearce for most of his tenure. A large fire in December 1851 destroyed 35,000 of the library's 55,000 books. Meehan and Pearce oversaw the reconstruction of the library after the disaster, restocking it with substantial purchases of books and rebuilding the main hall. The election of Abraham Lincoln in 1860 prompted Meehan's removal in 1861 in favor of Indiana physician John Gould Stephenson. Largely unbothered by this, he retired gracefully and died suddenly in 1863. Both Stephenson and later historians were generally critical of Meehan's tenure, noting that he mainly deferred to the Joint Committee on library policy, leaving the library's archaic catalog system unchanged, and failing to make any progress in transforming the institution into a true national library.

== Early life ==
John Silva Meehan was born in New York City on February 6, 1790. Little is recorded of his early life. He attended school in New York and later entered work as a printer. In 1811 or 1812, he moved to Burlington, New Jersey, to work as a printer at Lexicon Press under publisher David Allinson. There, Meehan helped print Richard S. Coxe's New Critical Pronouncing Dictionary of the English Language. He met Margaret Jones Monington, from Burlington, and married her in 1814.

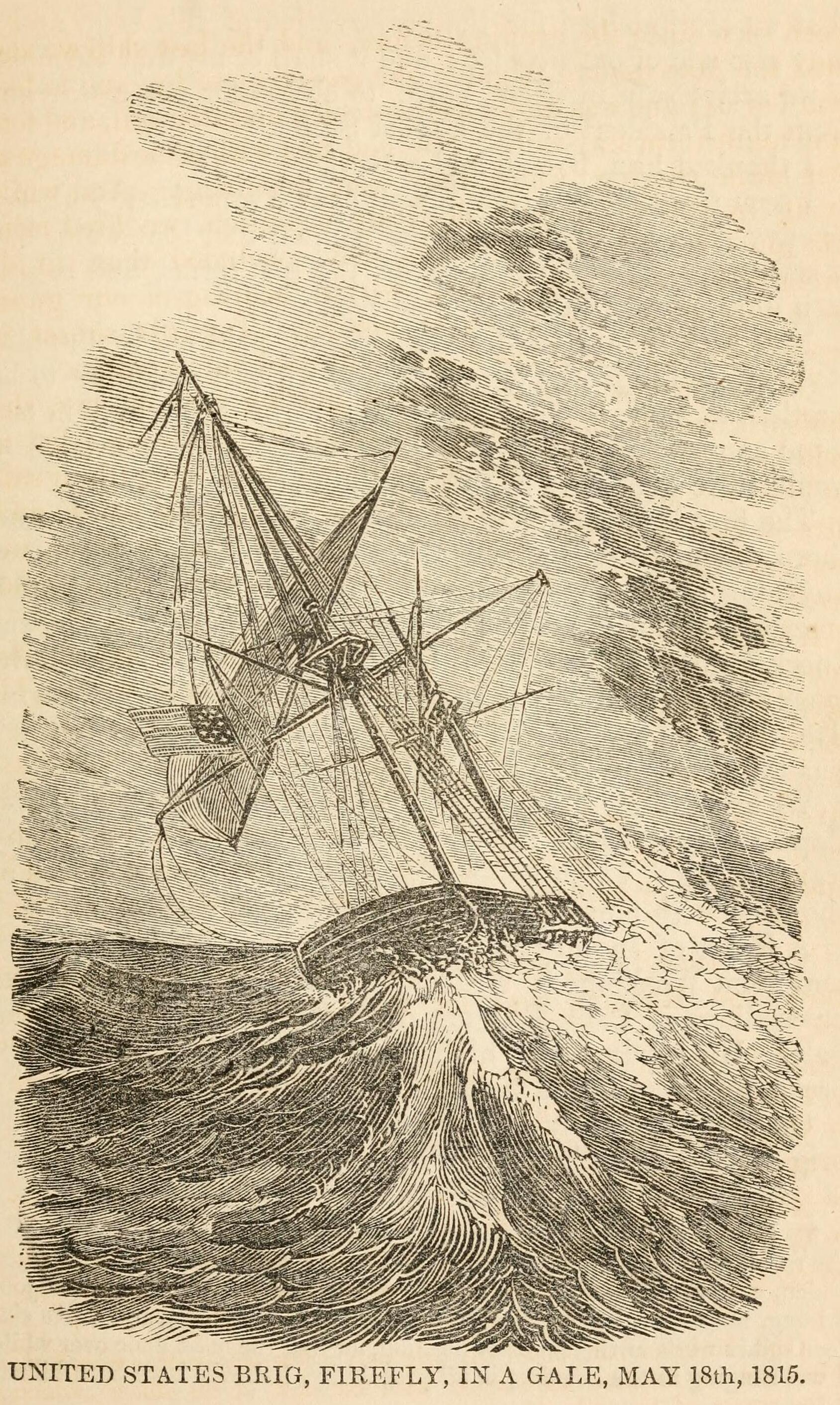
1857 depiction of the USS Firefly

In January 1815, Meehan returned to New York to enlist in the Navy. He served as a midshipman on the USS Firefly during the War of 1812. The Firefly was the flagship of a small group of commerce raiders in the West Indies. Shortly afterwards, the ratification of the Treaty of Ghent concluded the war. The Firefly did not see action, to the disappointment of Meehan and the rest of the crew. Leaving service in April 1815, he moved to Philadelphia and declined an offered commission in the Marine Corps to focus on his printing career. His first daughter, Susan, was born the same month.

== Publishing career ==
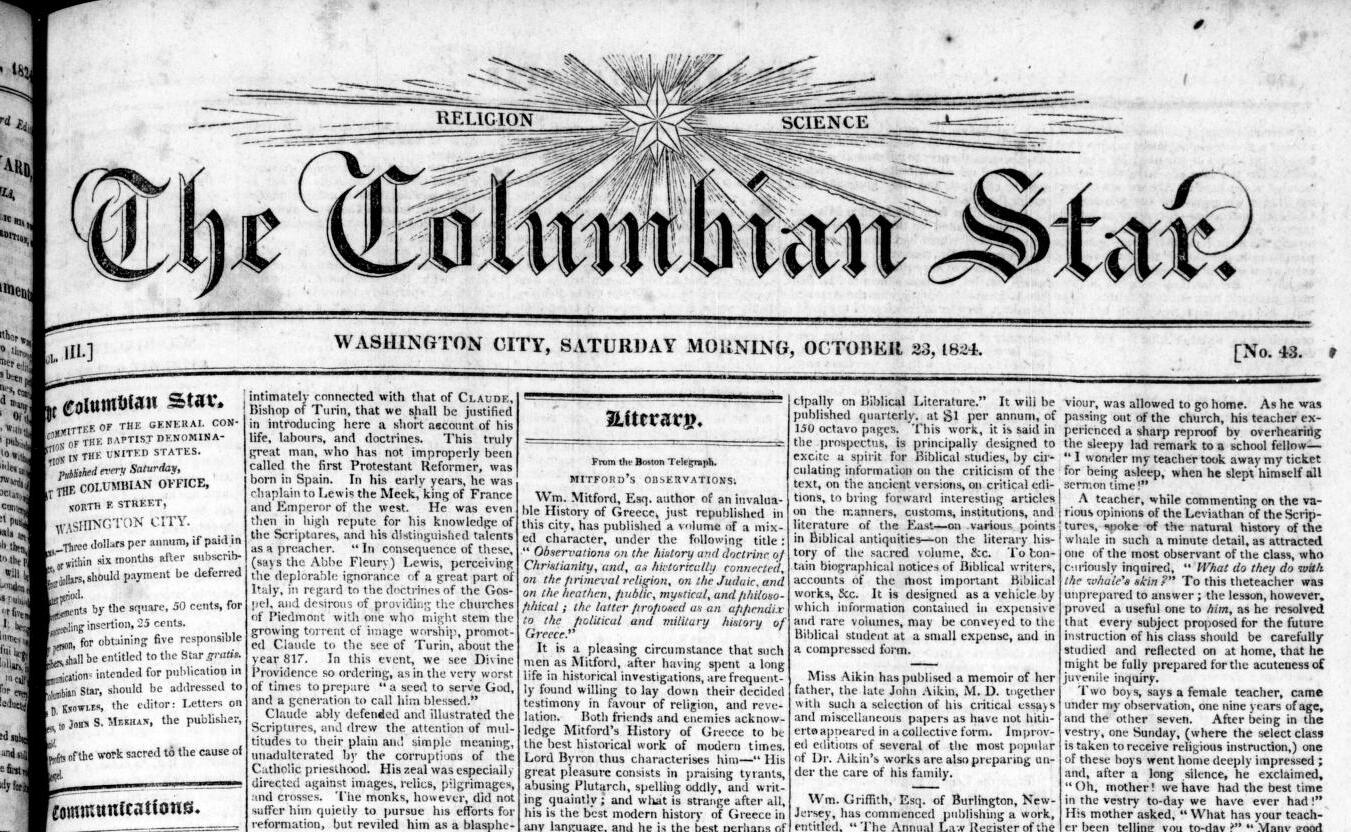
Masthead of The Columbian Star, October 23, 1824

In Philadelphia, Meehan partnered with fellow printer Robert Anderson to create the Anderson & Meehan firm. They began publishing the Latter Day Luminary in 1818, a Baptist General Conference-sponsored religious journal published five times a year. The firm moved to Washington, D.C., in early 1822, and the Luminary was shifted to a monthly publication. In February 1822, soon after moving to Washington, Anderson & Meehan also began publishing The Columbian Star, self-described as an apolitical Baptist weekly newspaper. The two served as the chief editors of the paper for about a year, before editorship was transferred to Reverend James D. Knowles. Alongside the two regular publications, the firm would occasionally publish other items, such as pamphlets. Anderson left the Star in early 1823 and the Luminary by the end of that year, leaving Meehan as the sole publisher. Knowles left the Star in July 1825, making Meehan the editor of the paper. Six months later Meehan left the paper, seeking not to associate the largely apolitical Star with his entry into political writing. He transferred publication and editorship of the Star to Baron Stow and discontinued the Luminary.

=== United States' Telegraph ===
Following his narrow loss in a House contingent election after the 1824 presidential election, Tennessee senator Andrew Jackson and his former running mate John C. Calhoun sought a supportive newspaper in Washington, D.C. The Jackson campaign indirectly purchased Jonathan Elliot's City of Washington Gazette through allies William B. Lewis and John Eaton. Although Meehan ostensibly purchased the paper, Eaton likely directed the purchase. Meehan served as the first publisher and chief editor of the paper, which was renamed the United States' Telegraph. The newspaper entered publication on February 6, 1826. The Telegraph was published in weekly, thrice-weekly, and daily editions, available by subscription. From the outset, the paper was immensely partisan, strongly opposed to the election of President John Quincy Adams and the appointment of Secretary of State Henry Clay. It declared that these violated "the most sacred principles of the Constitution" due to the contingent election and adopted the motto "Power is always stealing from the many to the few."

As editor, Meehan heavily criticized the system of executive patronage (also known as the spoils system). He attacked the appointment of an anti-Jacksonian postmaster in Jackson's hometown of Nashville, claiming the appointment was solely made to "mortify" Jackson. Meehan also emphasized defending Jackson's reputation, describing him as an "abused citizen" and claiming that Jackson was above the political games and corruption that he attributed to the Adams administration. National Republican-aligned newspapers began to oppose the Telegraph, with The National Intelligencer and National Journal claiming Meehan's editorials amounted to "indiscriminate opposition".

Soon after he acquired the paper, Jacksonians began to worry that Meehan lacked the ferocity and boldness needed to support the campaign. Although Meehan was recognized for his strong anti-Adams advocacy through the Telegraph, the ownership of the paper grew uncomfortable with his perceived inability to mount an effective response against the administration. The lack of transparency around the formation of the Telegraph invited allegations of conspiracy. The Richmond Whig described the paper as "edited by nobody knows whom, supported, nobody knows how".

Missouri editor and politician Duff Green was summoned to Washington by prominent Jacksonians to take over the Telegraph. He published several editorials in the paper and offered to purchase it after strong rebuttals from the National Journal. Green borrowed large amounts of money from Jacksonian politicians, including Eaton, to finance this purchase. An official deal between Meehan and Green was reached on June 5, 1826, purchasing the paper and its printing office. Meehan was hired as Green's assistant for a three-year term. Green soon left to travel the country, and Meehan continued serving as the de facto chief editor of the paper for several months. During this period, Meehan clashed with the pro-administration press on several issues, including Adams' alleged purchase of a billiards table and the military significance of Jackson's victory in the Battle of New Orleans.

The last issue of the Telegraph featuring Meehan's name was published on October 17, 1826. No official statement was made regarding the change of ownership. While working as Green's publisher, Meehan additionally served as the secretary of the board of trustees of the Baptist Columbian College.

== Librarian of Congress ==
=== Appointment ===
Upon Jackson's election in 1828, the incoming administration began a mass shift of government positions in favor of supportive Democrats via the spoils system. George Watterston, the librarian of Congress since 1815, had strong connections to many of Jackson's opponents, including Henry Clay. Watterston was later described by historian David C. Mearns as having been a "librarian of one side of the aisle". Jackson originally intended to replace Watterston with Charles P. Tutt, but Tutt declined in favor of a position as U.S. Navy Agent at Pensacola.

Green wrote to Andrew Jackson on April 23, 1829, recommending Meehan as Watterston's replacement for librarian of Congress. Green, in increasing amounts of debt, wished to hire an assistant editor at a lower rate than that agreed for Meehan. Biographer Christian Nappo described the letter as significantly embellishing Meehan's scholarly capabilities and his appointment itself as "purely an act of political patronage".

I am much at a loss to find the terms to express to you the solicitude which I feel on behalf of Mr. Meehan ... My personal acquaintance with him commenced in the spring of 1826, when I found him the Editor of the Telegraph. He then relinquished the establishment to me, and accepted a salary of $1200 per annum. I have found him to be an able auxiliary, a faithful friend, and one of those men rarely to be found—a strictly conscientious and pious Christian. His ardent attachment to you, and his devotion to the great principles upon which you have been elected, is surpassed by those of no other individual. He is the father of an amiable family, who are entirely dependent upon his earnings for support. He is a good scholar, a printer and publisher by profession, and of the most amiable and conciliatory manners. He has not, that I know of a single enemy—yet no man has more firmness. So much for the man.

— Duff Green, letter to Andrew Jackson, April 23, 1829

Meehan was officially appointed as librarian on May 28, 1829. Clay, angered by the appointment, compared Watterston's removal to the burning of the Library of Alexandria. The New-England Palladium condemned Watterston's removal but conceded that Meehan was ultimately "an amiable and respectable man" and preferable to other possible Jacksonian candidates. The strongly anti-Jacksonian National Journal and Meehan's former United States' Telegraph extensively covered Meehan's appointment, debating the legality of the move. Jacksonian press attacked Watterston's character, describing him as pompous and impractical.

Debates over the appointment also reflected broader attitudes towards the future of the library. Rather than simply providing for Congress, Watterston sought to transform the Library of Congress into a comprehensive national library aimed at the education of the general public, which Jacksonians feared would represent increased federal power. However, Jackson may have been unaware of Watterston's plans when initially appointing Meehan.

Watterston himself was indignant at his replacement, describing Meehan as "very ordinary" and unfitting for the Library of Congress. He repeatedly and unsuccessfully attempted to reclaim the position for the rest of his life, through what biographer John McDonough described as a mix of "cajolery, threats, and flattery". Despite his past as a partisan editor, Meehan remained a relatively apolitical librarian, and he retained his position through multiple Whig presidencies.

=== Tenure ===
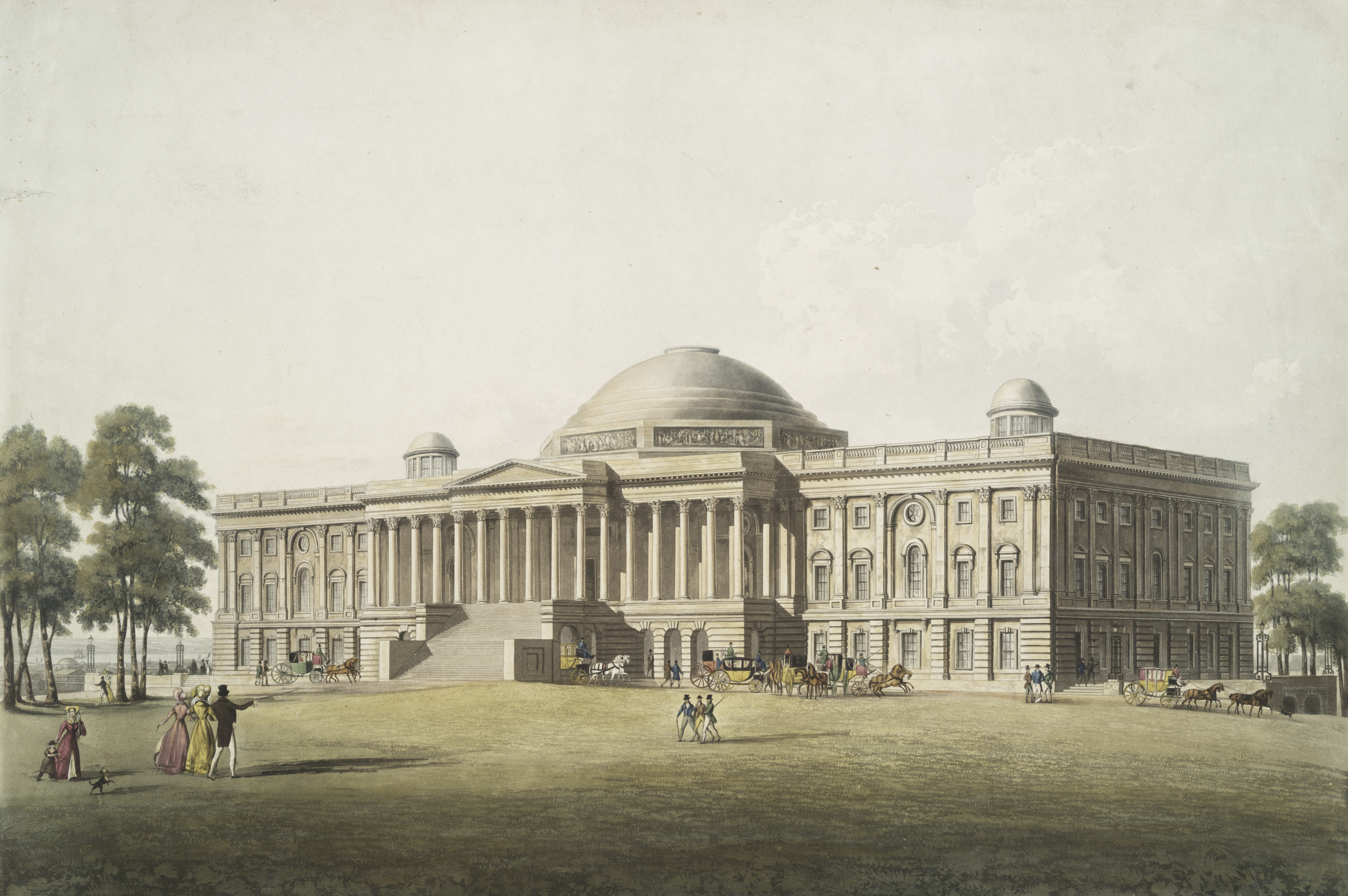
1825 depiction of the U.S. Capitol. The Library of Congress would occupy a portion of the building until 1897.

When Meehan took office, the library was situated within the western portion of the U.S. Capitol, and contained about 16,000 books. He wrote in irritation at the conditions within the library, describing the various maintenance tasks needed to restore damaged books, clean shelves, and remove bookworms. In July 1832, Congress approved expansions to the Law Library of Congress, designating a nearby room to hold the slightly over 2,000 law books held in the collections. Around this time, Meehan appointed his son C. H. Wharton Meehan, previously employed as his assistant, to head the Law Library.

From the outset, Meehan collaborated with the Congressional Joint Committee on the Library, often deferring to its advice regardless of partisan lines. He worked closely with the Democratic-Republican Edward Everett during the early 1830s. Maryland Senator James Pearce was appointed chairman of the Joint Committee in 1845, beginning a long-running period of close collaboration between him and Meehan. Historian Carl Ostrowski described Meehan as having "never made a move without first consulting Pearce". Ostrowski characterized the Joint Committee during this period as negligent to the library, often not meeting or failing to achieve a quorum.

The Joint Committee was generally on the forefront of management during the 1830s and 1840s. National Intelligencer coverage in the mid-1830s attributed the Library's holdings to various members of the committee, briefly praising Meehan for his "civility and attention" to visitors. In contrast to Watterston's prominent role in discussion of American libraries, he is not mentioned within 1830s periodicals on American libraries.

==== Cataloguing and acquisitions ====
A steady appropriation of US$5,000 a year for the purchase of books, plus an additional US$1,000–US$2,000 for law books, was allocated to Meehan throughout his career with occasional exceptions. Meehan steadily acquired books, although he was criticized for prioritizing the acquisition of popular books over scholarly concerns. Journalist Anne Royall rebuked him for his purchasing habits, claiming he had failed to "anticipate the research needs of legislators or scholars" and criticizing the acquisition of numerous books intended for Sunday school students. Two major opportunities were presented to purchase expansive collections but were both denied by Congress, with Meehan doing little to advocate for the prospect. An 1836 offer to purchase Russian nobleman Dmitry Buturlin's multilingual collection of 25,000 books was denied by a 17–16 vote. An offer in 1844 to acquire the Durazzo family library, containing over 10,000 volumes, was rejected for largely containing non-English literature.

Classification systems in the library were archaic, with shelves placed in accordance with a modified version of Thomas Jefferson's original classification schema, itself based on the Baconian conceptualization of knowledge. Books were generally categorized by subject and within subjects by size. Library catalogs divided books by subject, with books within each subject listed alphabetically. Many years passed between different general catalogs of the library, requiring the consultation of additional supplementary listings. A new catalog was produced in 1839, the first since 1830. The total number of volumes in the library had increased to around 30,000, encompassing 10,746 titles. Over time, the time-intensive task of cataloging new entries was delegated to Meehan's assistant, E. B. Stelle. The limited space and resources available to the library strongly limited the number of books which could be received. In 1849, Meehan wrote to the library's book agent Obadiah Rich, noting that the "rooms for the accommodation of our Library are now so thoroughly filled, that we find it very difficult to take in any more books." Due to his reputation as a skilled businessman, Meehan was tasked by Congress to manage and book-keep what biographer John McDonough labeled a "bewildering variety of special funds" in addition to his duties within the library. Many of these were publishing or printing funds, with specific funds for the republication of the works of John Adams, Thomas Jefferson, Alexander Hamilton, and James Madison, as well as publications on the United States Exploring Expedition and the Library of Congress catalog. Additional funds placed on Meehan's caseload included the funding for G. P. A. Healy's portraits of presidents, a fund to acquire art for display at the Capitol, and the United States Botanic Garden Fund, which at times forced Meehan to supervise the garden's workers and handle correspondence with Congressmen seeking plant specimens for their home gardens.

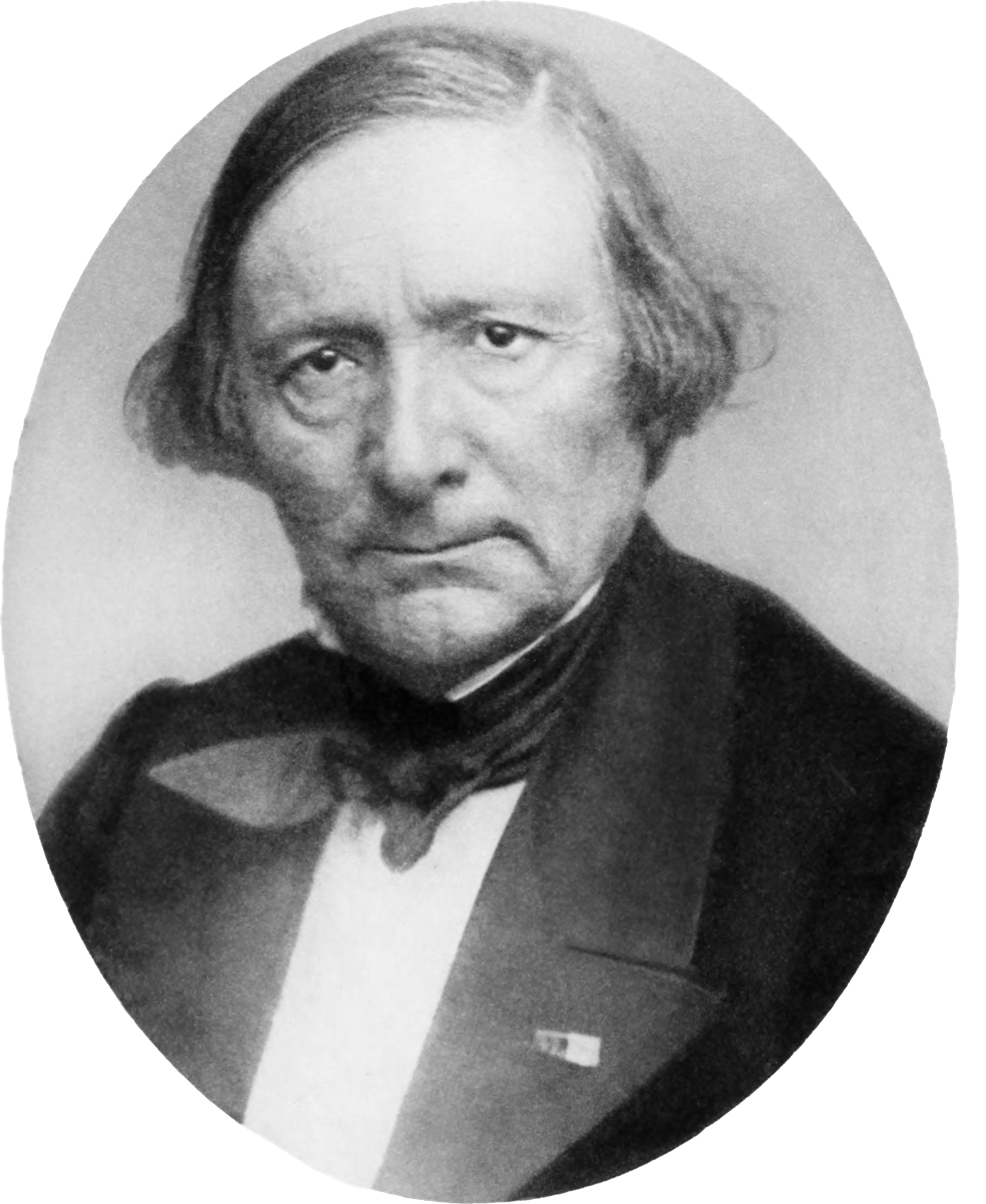
Alexandre Vattemare's ineffective attempts at a transatlantic document exchange system frustrated Meehan.

In 1840, French ventriloquist and actor Alexandre Vattemare received federal support for his proposed government document exchange system between the United States and France. Meehan provided Vattemare with 700 volumes of congressional documents, an amount "said to be twice as large as any in Washington". Widespread American enthusiasm for the program led to a massive quantity of documents, which Vattemare was unable to manage effectively. Meehan grew increasingly upset with the poor condition of shipments received through the program, describing the documents as poor quality and incomplete. At least two French diplomatic officials contacted Meehan and asked him not to pursue exchanges through Vattemare. Congress terminated the program in June 1853. Despite this, Vattemare continued sporadic and unwanted shipments of books to the Library of Congress. The final shipment was sent in 1858, leading to a frustrated response from Meehan and the return of Vattemare's shipment, unopened.

==== Fire of 1851 and aftermath ====
Slightly before 8:00 am on December 24, 1851, a large fire broke out in the main room of the Library of Congress. Meehan was quickly summoned to the scene. Freezing temperatures impaired fire hoses, slowing efforts to put out the fire. While the main room was essentially unsalvageable, books in adjacent rooms were quickly moved to safety. A number of fire engine crews, alongside a group of nearby Marines, were able to extinguish the blaze by around 11:00 am. About 35,000 of the library's 55,000 books were destroyed, alongside various paintings and statues. An inquiry was launched over the coming days to investigate the cause of the fire: after testimony from Meehan, Thomas U. Walter, the Architect of the Capitol, determined that the fire was sparked by the timbers of library alcoves extending into a chimney-flue. Any potential censures or charges were dismissed.

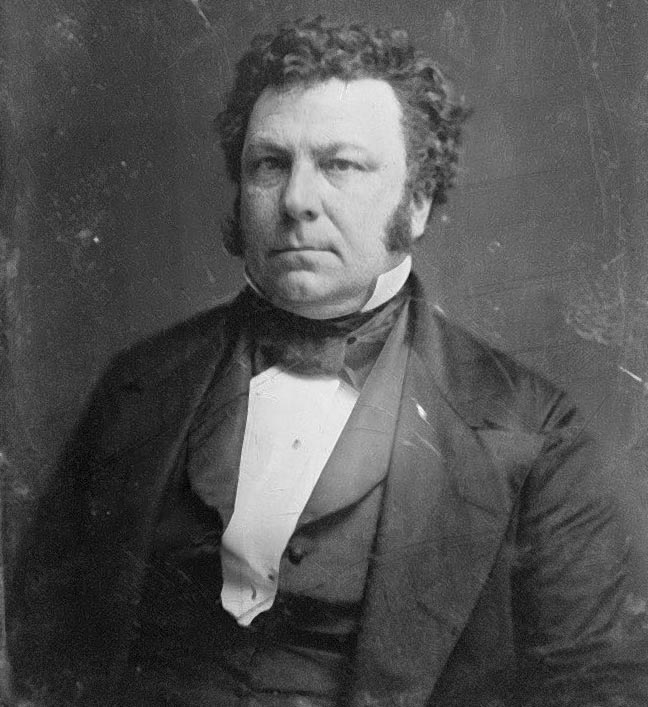
Senator James Pearce served as Meehan's partner and ally for much of his tenure as librarian.

Pearce comforted Meehan in the aftermath of the 1851 fire, leading him to describe Pearce as "so eminent a gentleman, and so discriminating a friend". Together with Walter, they worked steadily on rebuilding efforts over the course of 1852. Congress authorized various appropriations to finance the reconstruction of the library and the repurchase of lost books. By March 1852, temporary facilities for the library had been finished. The construction process of the main library faced numerous delays, irritating Meehan. While Walter had promised in March that the work would be completed in three months, the reconstruction of the main room was not finished until early 1853. Despite these delays, Meehan was extremely pleased with the library room, calling it "truly beautiful".

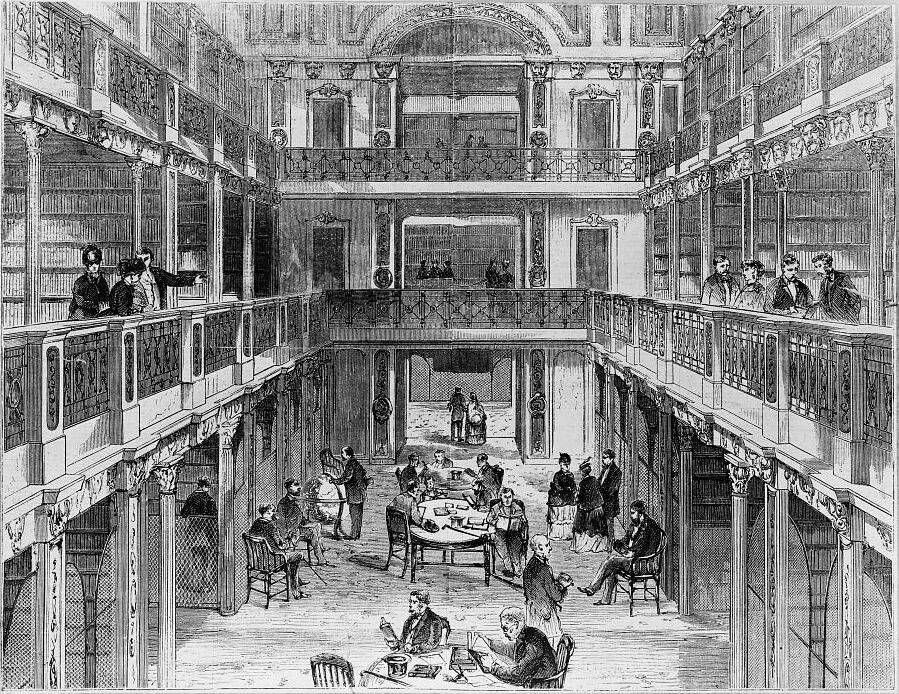
View of the library c. 1853, following rebuilding

Meehan commissioned Rich Brothers, a London-based book dealing firm, to restock the library. His purchasing efforts were criticized by an anonymous two-part National Intelligencer article (sometimes attributed to Smithsonian librarian Charles Coffin Jewett) stating that an agent should have been sent overseas to purchase books and that the Library of Congress should have attempted to become "a systematic collection of books chosen with competent bibliographic learning for a specific and well-defined purpose". Meehan rebuked the anonymous author, writing that such efforts would place "Congress in a position which admits that they cannot select the books they need."

Meehan diligently produced various "want lists" based on earlier catalogs. Although control over what books the library was to purchase had been shifted from the Joint Committee to the librarian of Congress, Meehan reassured Pearce that the prior system was still in effect and that he did not intend to expand his control over book acquisition. Congressman and educational reformer Horace Mann submitted a resolution to the committee shortly before his congressional retirement in March 1853, calling for the library to accept any of the lost books if offered at a cheaper price than other sellers. This was strongly opposed by Pearce and Meehan, who preferred the ease of purchases through the Rich Brothers. In response, they waited out Mann's retirement and the beginning of the 33rd United States Congress and continued the previous path.

The library's collections were restored by early 1856, following the purchase of 36,000 books at a "cost very far below the prices given for the lost books" through Rich Brothers. Increased annual funding for the library, on top of various special appropriations, enabled the rapid growth of the library over the following years. An attempt by Jewett and the Smithsonian Institution to re-catalog the library ended after criticism from Meehan. Rumors that President Franklin Pierce had appointed a new librarian of Congress troubled Meehan. After consultation with Pearce, he met with Secretary of War Jefferson Davis, who reassured him that the rumors were unfounded. Secretary of State Lewis Cass of the succeeding Buchanan administration also reaffirmed Meehan's position as librarian.

=== Removal ===
Following the election of President Abraham Lincoln and the ensuing secession of the southern states in late 1860 and early 1861, Meehan's position became increasingly unstable. Journalist and librarian Ainsworth Spofford described him as a "very ancient fossil", and rumors began to circulate of pro-Southern sympathies. Pearce wrote to Lincoln in March 1861, asking that Meehan be allowed to continue his role as librarian. Following extensive lobbying and support from various Midwestern Republicans, Indiana physician and Lincoln campaign delegate John Gould Stephenson was able to convince Lincoln to choose him for the position. Stephenson officially accepted his appointment on May 24, 1861, and Meehan left his duties at the end of the month.

=== Legacy ===
Stephenson, Meehan's successor, complained that the library had fallen into disrepair and neglect. A December 1861 report commissioned by Stephenson (possibly written by Spofford) noted large numbers of uncleaned, miscataloged, and misplaced books. The cataloguing and purchasing systems were also noted to be deficient. Stephenson considered much of Meehan's library staff incompetent and initiated a mass change of staff; Meehan's son, Law Library head C. H. Wharton Meehan, became the sole retained assistant.

Later historians called into question Meehan's abilities as librarian, criticizing his inability to transform the Library of Congress into a national library. In his 1904 History of the Library of Congress, historian William Dawson Johnston described Meehan as unable to foresee future needs of the library but able to maintain his position due to possessing "the second qualification of a successful administrator, that is, business ability". Historian Carl Ostrowski was also critical of Meehan's contributions to the library, noting in 2000 that he chose to exercise little influence over any area of library policy.

== Personal life and death ==
Meehan and his wife Margaret had seven children. Margaret died during childbirth in July 1826, followed by her infant later the same day. Meehan remarried in October 1827 to Rachel T. Monington, his wife's sister, and the two would go on to have two more children together. Only three of Meehan's children outlived him.

A year after leaving office, Meehan sought a position as a Treasury clerk due to financial concerns. Pearce and William P. Fessenden wrote to Treasury Secretary Salmon P. Chase on Meehan's behalf to advocate for his employment. In the afternoon of April 24, 1863, Meehan suddenly died from apoplexy in his home in Capitol Hill, Washington. An obituary described him as "[leaving] to his family that best inheritance, an unsullied name." C. H. Wharton Meehan continued in his role as custodian of the Law Library until his own death in July 1872.
