= John Gould Stephenson =

American librarian and 5th Librarian of Congress

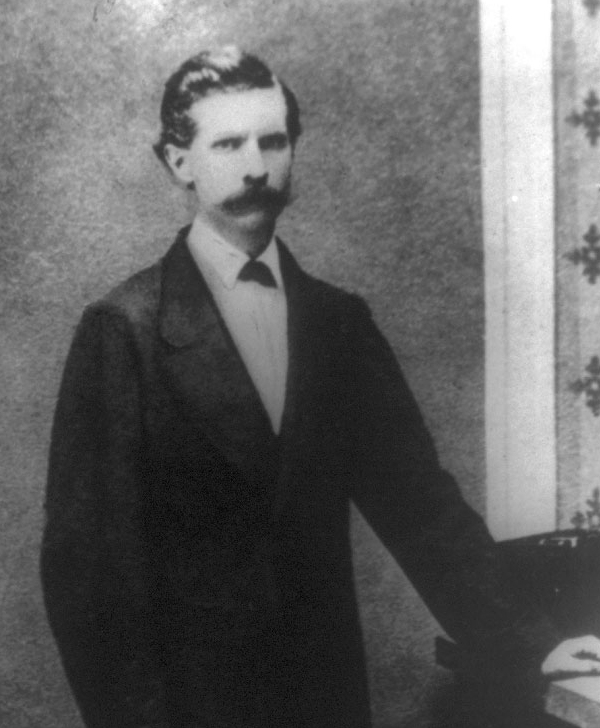

Librarian of Congress
- In office May 24, 1861 – December 31, 1864
- President: Abraham Lincoln
- Preceded by: John Silva Meehan
- Succeeded by: Ainsworth Rand Spofford

Personal details
- Born: March 1, 1828 Lancaster, New Hampshire, U.S.
- Died: November 11, 1883 (aged 55) Washington, D.C., U.S.
- Resting place: Congressional Cemetery
- Party: Republican
- Education: Dartmouth College; Castleton University (MD)

Military service
- Allegiance: Union
- Branch/service: Union Army
- Years of service: 1861–1864
- Rank: Colonel
- Unit: Indiana Legion; Iron Brigade
- Battles/wars: American Civil War • Battle of Chancellorsville • Battle of Gettysburg

John Gould Stephenson (March 1, 1828 – November 11, 1883) was an American medical doctor and soldier who served as Librarian of Congress from 1861 to 1864. Born in Lancaster, New Hampshire, to a prominent merchant family, he attended the Dartmouth Medical College and Castleton Medical College, where he received his M.D in 1849. Stephenson moved to Terre Haute, Indiana, in the early 1850s, where he became active in the temperance movement and the nascent Republican Party. He campaigned for Abraham Lincoln in the 1859 Senate race in Illinois and the 1860 presidential election. He pursued an appointment as Librarian of Congress immediately following Lincoln's election, possibly due to his brother's work as a librarian in Cincinnati. After a lengthy pressure campaign from prominent Republicans, Lincoln appointed Stephenson as Librarian of Congress, replacing long-term incumbent John Silva Meehan despite opposition from the Joint Committee on the Library.

Believing the library had fallen into neglect under Meehan's administration, Stephenson began a mass change of staff soon after taking office, firing all but one assistant. He hired journalist Ainsworth Rand Spofford, a friend of his brother, as assistant librarian in August 1861. Although never formally commissioned, Stephenson began serving in the Union Army soon after his appointment as Librarian of Congress. He briefly served as an acting naval surgeon to the 19th Indiana Infantry in 1861, before serving as an aide-de-camp in the Indiana militia, where he achieved the rank of colonel. In 1863, he served as the aide-de-camp of Solomon Meredith, commander of the Iron Brigade, and saw action at the battles of Chancellorsville and Gettysburg. He resigned as librarian for unclear reasons in December 1864, and was succeeded by Spofford. He served in various positions as a legal clerk during the 1870s, and was appointed as a medical examiner at the Bureau of Pensions in Washington in the early 1880s. He died after a period of illness and was buried in the Congressional Cemetery.

== Early life and career ==
On March 1, 1828, John Gould Stephenson was born in Lancaster, New Hampshire, to Reuben and Mary King Stephenson (née Baker), the fourth of eight children. Reuben Stephenson was a merchant who operated a general store in Lancaster, additionally serving as a selectman, county coroner, deputy sheriff, constable, fire warden, and high sheriff. Other members of the Stephenson family were elected to a variety of local civic positions. John Stephenson attended school at the Lancaster Academy, which his father had co-incorporated in 1828. Stephenson was active in theater at the academy, performing in a variety of plays. He initially pursued further education at Dartmouth Medical School before transferring to Castleton Medical College, where he received his Doctor of Medicine on November 23, 1849.

The 1850 census lists Stephenson as a physician in Lancaster, but it is unclear if he ever practiced medicine in the town. He likely moved to Terre Haute, Indiana, in 1851, where he worked as a physician and surgeon. While in Terre Haute, he became involved with the temperance movement, joining the local Sons of Temperance chapter, as well as with the nascent Republican Party. He campaigned on behalf of Abraham Lincoln in the 1859 Senate race in Illinois against Stephen Douglas, where Stephenson was described as an "efficient speaker" by Indiana politician William P. Dole.

Stephenson was one of Lincoln's earliest advocates for the 1860 Republican National Convention in Chicago, writing in support of his candidacy in March 1860. At the convention, he worked to influence the Kentucky delegation into supporting Lincoln. He campaigned for Lincoln in both Indiana and Illinois, writing that he spent several weeks campaigning for him in Clark County and Edgar County, Illinois.

== Librarian of Congress ==
=== Appointment ===
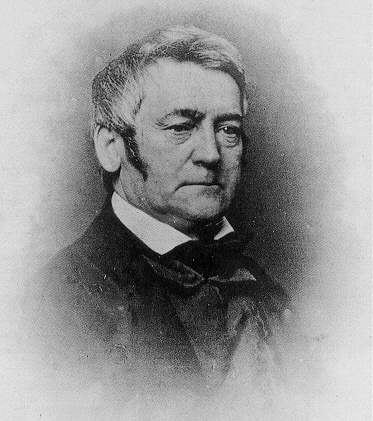
John Silva Meehan, librarian of Congress from 1829 to 1861

Shortly after Lincoln's victory in the presidential election, Stephenson began to pursue a political appointment as the librarian of Congress, using connections within the Republican Party. His brother, Reuben Henry Stephenson, worked as the librarian of the Young Men's Mercantile Library of Cincinnati, and this may have influenced him to pursue the position. Many testimonials in favor of appointing Stephenson to the position were sent to Lincoln, beginning within a few weeks after the election. Various figures, including local physicians and a Kentucky Republican convention delegate, wrote to Lincoln, emphasizing Stephenson's service to the Republican Party and the Lincoln campaign. In March 1861, Senator Henry S. Lane wrote to Lincoln in support, stating that Stephenson was a "gentleman of fine education" and that his appointment would "give great pleasure to the Republicans of his neighborhood". At least one other candidate, Hezekiah Lord Hosmer, ran for the position.

Stephenson arrived in Washington, D.C., at some point before May 1861 and wrote a letter to Lincoln asking to be appointed, urging haste so as to become acquainted with the library before the opening of the next session of Congress. Dole, Lincoln's Commissioner of Indian Affairs, described meeting with Lincoln to urge Stephenson's appointment:

I have just left Mr. Lincoln. I found him alone this evening and had a good old fashioned talk as I frequently have and always, when he has leisure ... Mr. Lincoln is very kind to me and has given me not only what I have asked for myself but so far nearly anything I have asked for my friends ... and promised me to appoint Dr. Stevenson Congressional Librarian tomorrow. You know that the Dr. is not heavy mettal [sic] but he has worked hard for us & is poor and can hand down books to M. C. as well & as gracefully as any one and besides he is a Wabash man and I am for him. You know I never forget friends.

— William P. Dole, letter to Dr. Davis, May 14, 1861

The incumbent librarian, John Silva Meehan, had held the position since 1829. Meehan's longtime ally and associate James Pearce's lack of clear support for the Union following the secession of the Southern states significantly impacted his political influence. Although publicly apolitical, Meehan himself faced rumors of Southern sympathies. Librarian of Congress Ainsworth Rand Spofford attributed Meehan's age and period of service as the primary factor for his replacement, writing that he had become "a very ancient fossil". Pearce urged the president not to replace Meehan, gaining support from the other two senators of the Congressional Joint Committee on the Library. Despite this, Lincoln asked Secretary of State William H. Seward to send him a commission for Stephenson on May 23, with Stephenson accepting the following day, becoming the fifth librarian of Congress. Meehan calmly accepted his dismissal and left his duties at the end of May.

=== Tenure ===
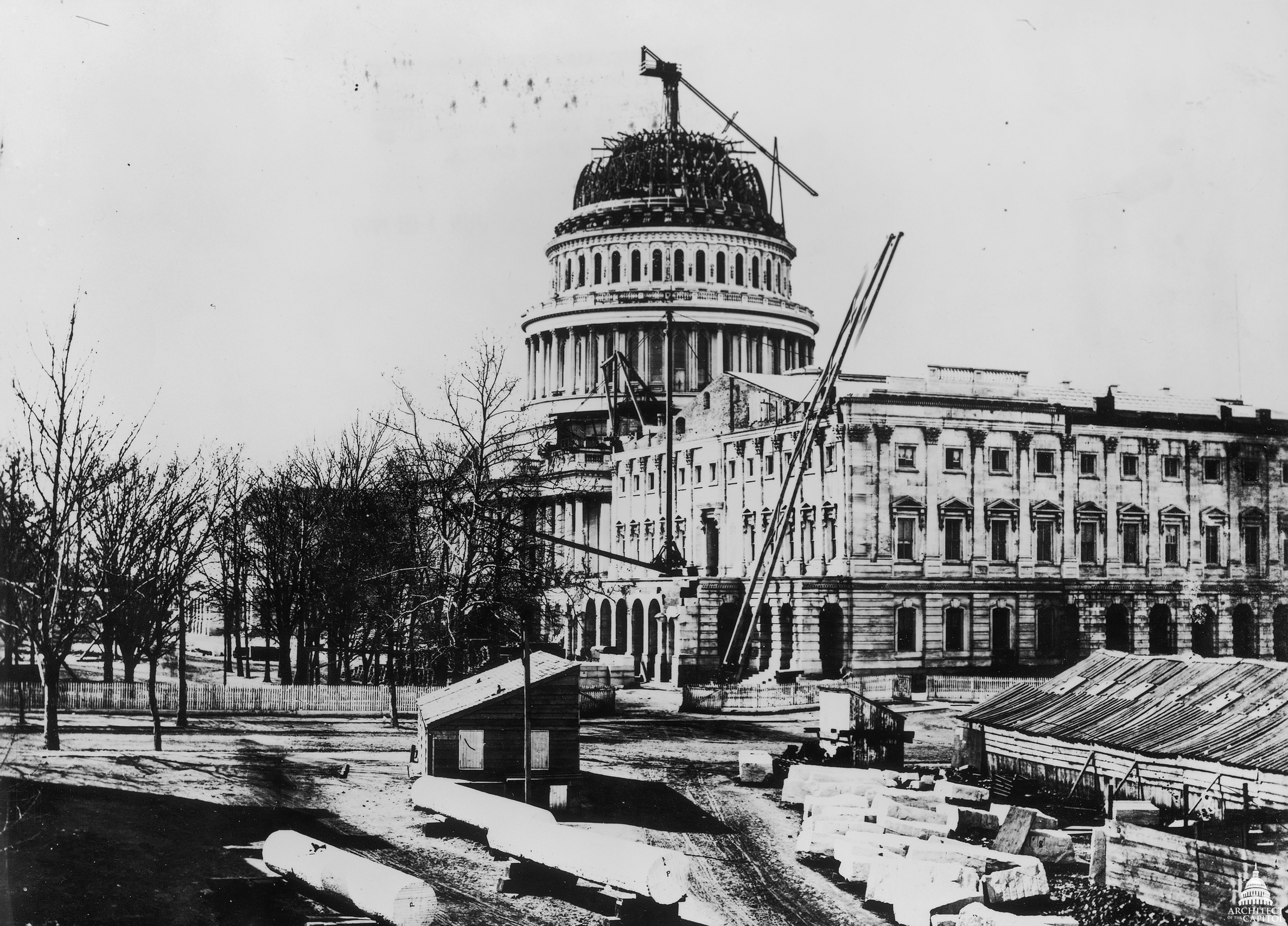
The United States Capitol with its dome under construction, early 1860s. The Library of Congress occupied a portion of the building until 1897.

In the months after assuming office, Stephenson became irritated with the state of the library, viewing it as having fallen into disrepair and neglect under his predecessor. He threw out what he deemed low-quality books and initiated a mass change of staff, firing all assistants except Meehan's son, Law Library head C. H. Wharton Meehan. The rapid change of staff alarmed the members of the Joint Committee. Pearce believed Stephenson had gone beyond his authority, especially in the disposal of books, but noted that the Joint Committee was largely powerless to stop him. Lincoln was confused by the change of staff, and asked Caleb B. Smith if Stephenson had resigned. Stephenson defended his actions to the Joint Committee, stating in the annual report that the firing of the previous staff was because "his conviction, induced by several months of trial and observation, as well as by the facts as to the condition of the Library already recited, of their incapacity for their several posts."

Stephenson was infuriated by the presence of the War Department's bakeries in the Capitol basement during the Civil War, installed to feed troops stationed nearby. Smoke and soot from the ovens drifted up into the Library of Congress, staining books and tables. The bakeries also disabled the library's heating systems during operation, as a flue for the baking operation had been built inside the preexisting flue used by the library's furnace. Senator Solomon Foot rallied Senate members in favor of the removal of the bakeries, upset with smoke drifting into the Senate chambers. Representative Charles R. Train also advocated against the ovens, citing the damage to the Library of Congress, but the resolution failed in the House. They were not removed until October 1862, following a letter to Lincoln from Stephenson and commissioner B. B. French.

==== Appointment of Spofford ====
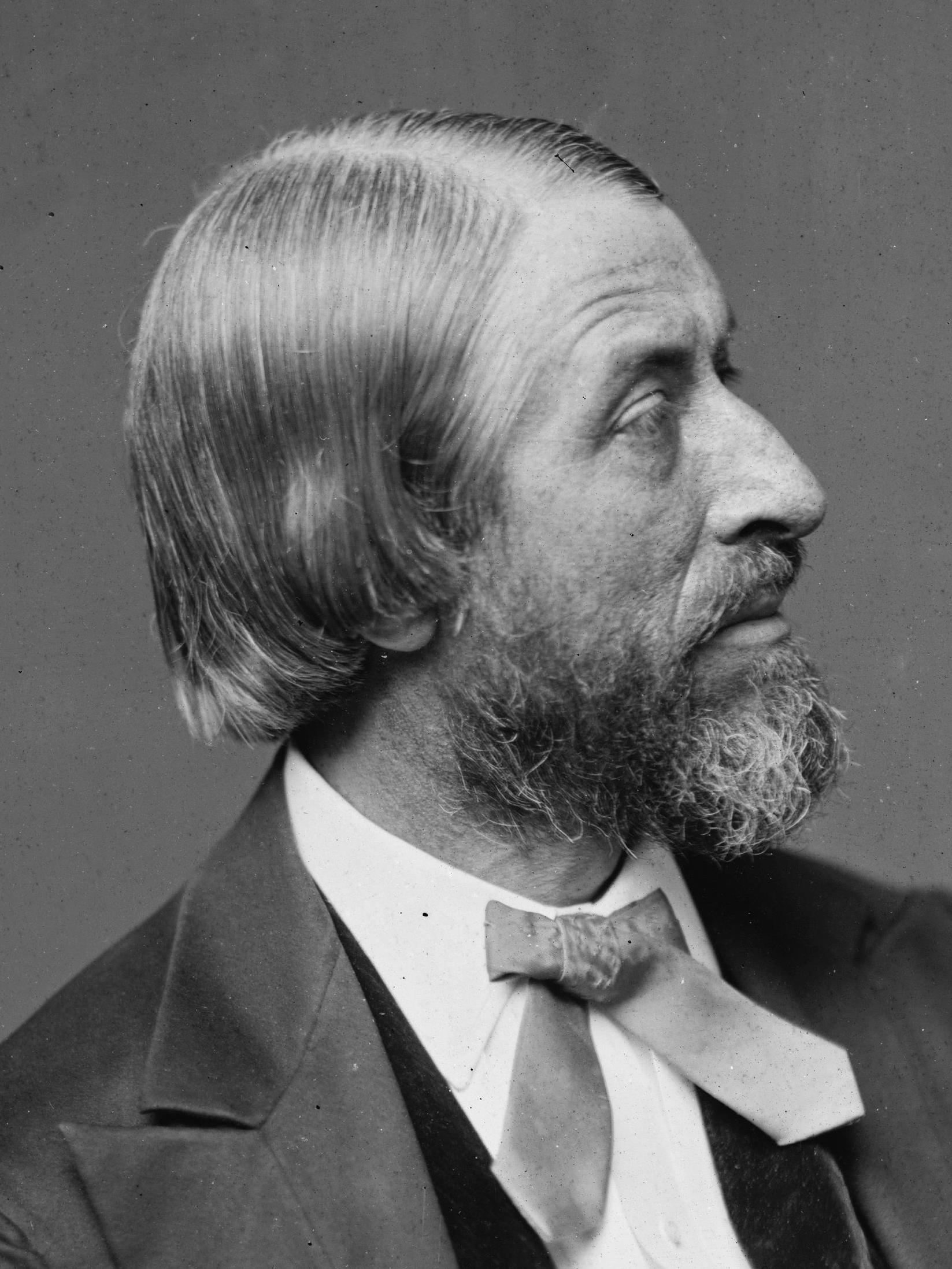
Ainsworth Rand Spofford, c. 1870s

Around the beginning of August 1861, Stephenson offered the position of assistant librarian to Ainsworth Rand Spofford, a war journalist who had begun to browse the Library of Congress when not writing. Stephenson's brother, Reuben, had long been a close friend of Spofford, both being members of the Literary Club of Cincinnati. Spofford agreed after some deliberation, and began working in late September. Stephenson departed Washington the same day Spofford began work to care for wounded soldiers. He did not return for two months. Spofford held warm feelings towards him, writing that he was a "thorough good fellow—liberal—high-minded—active—but with no special knowledge of books". Spofford and fellow assistant librarian Edward B. Stelle signed many of the library documents during the period. Library of Congress historian Lucy Salamanca described Stephenson's appointment of Spofford as "his single greatest contribution to the development of the library".

==== Military service ====
Due to the ongoing civil war, Stephenson began to spend extended periods in military service soon after his appointment as Librarian of Congress. Spofford noted that he "devoted a large portion of his time" to care for ill soldiers of the 19th Indiana Infantry Regiment in late September 1861, placed into a temporary hospital inside the Patent Office. Stephenson never enlisted or was formally commissioned into formal military, but served in a number of medical roles during the war. He reported that he briefly served as acting naval surgeon of the 19th Indiana Infantry Regiment in 1861. On January 10, 1862, Stephenson was commissioned into the Indiana Legion, the state militia, as an aide-de-camp, later achieving the rank of colonel. In 1863, he served as the aide-de-camp of Solomon Meredith, commander of the Iron Brigade of the Army of the Potomac, seeing action at Fitzhugh's Crossing, Chancellorsville, and Gettysburg. He received a citation for his service at Gettysburg from Major General Abner Doubleday. Meredith wrote to Lincoln shortly after Gettysburg, recommending a promotion for Stephenson.

==== Resignation and legacy ====
For unclear reasons, Stephenson indicated an intention to resign in late 1864. Seeking to succeed him as librarian, Spofford began a lengthy letter-writing campaign, soliciting endorsements from every congressional representative and senator. Charles Lanman, former librarian of the House of Representatives, was also a candidate for the position. Stephenson announced his resignation on December 22, 1864, with Spofford officially succeeding him on December 31. William Dawson Johnston, writing in 1904, attributed Stephenson's resignation to his engagement in "speculations created by the War", but no firm evidence has emerged corroborating the claim. In 1872, the library's former London agent, was awarded $1,480 by Congress after he was found to have been "unjustly defrauded by the conduct of the Librarian" in 1863; this may have been related to Stephenson's financial speculations.

Stephenson's short tenure as librarian was mainly occupied by his military service, with little direct contribution to the library and its policies. Twentieth-century librarian Keyes Metcalf described him as the last representative of an era of highly political appointees to the Library of Congress, writing that his appointment of Spofford was his "chief claim to fame" due to the latter's reforms to the library. Historian David C. Mearns described Stephenson's tenure as "difficult to appraise", but noted that the library took a diminished role during the Civil War, whether from Stephenson's absences or merely from the war itself.

== Later life and death ==
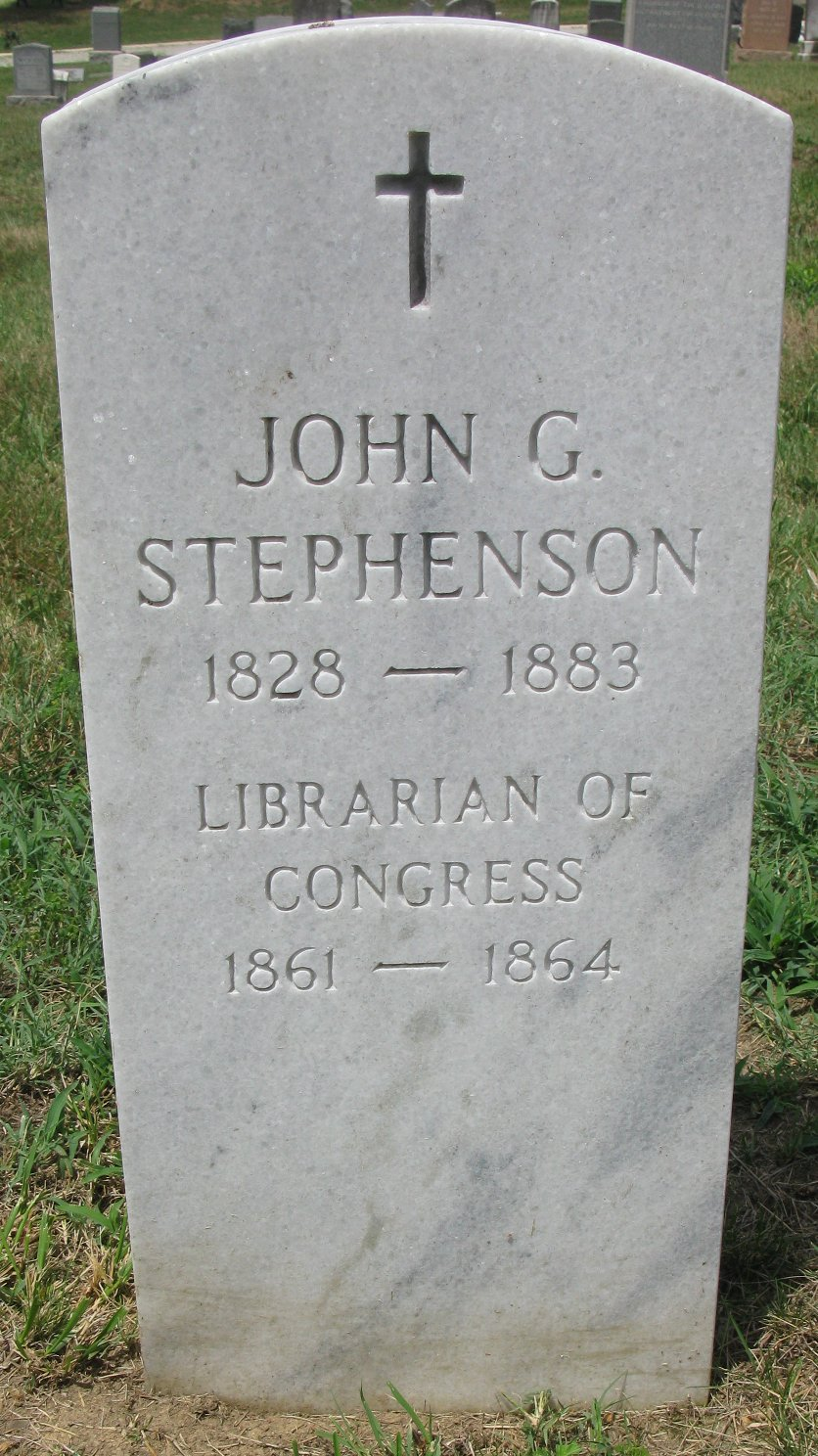
Stephenson's tombstone at the Congressional Cemetery

Little information is known about Stephenson's later life. He stated that he was employed "in various capacities as a clerk not in service of the United States" between 1865 and 1880, although the exact location or locations of his residence during this time is unknown. He may have stayed in Washington, D.C., or temporarily returned to Indiana. At some point, he served as a clerk to the District of Columbia Legislative Assembly. He is recorded as a resident of Washington, D.C., in the 1870 census, in a 1871 edition of Boyd's Directory, and in two 1877 court cases revolving around a furniture ownership dispute. In April 1880, Captain Albert Grant wrote to Alexander Ramsey, the Secretary of War, forwarding Stephenson's request to be appointed as a clerk within the Office of the Surgeon General, and noting his services during the Civil War and his "unwavering devotion to the Republican Party since its first organization". He was appointed to the Record and Pension Division of the Office in September 1880, and served until March 30, 1881, when he was discharged without a stated cause.

In either November 1881 or July 1883, Stephenson entered employment as a medical examiner in the Bureau of Pensions in Washington, D.C. In August 1883, he saw a physician for persistent insomnia, and by mid-October was too ill to continue work. Captain Grant invited Stephenson to stay at his home to recover, where he died on November 11, 1883. A medical examiner attributed his death to heart disease. Veterans of the First Army Corps organized his funeral at the Metropolitan Presbyterian Church, and he was buried at the Washington Congressional Cemetery.
