= Ainsworth Rand Spofford =

Librarian of Congress from 1864 to 1897

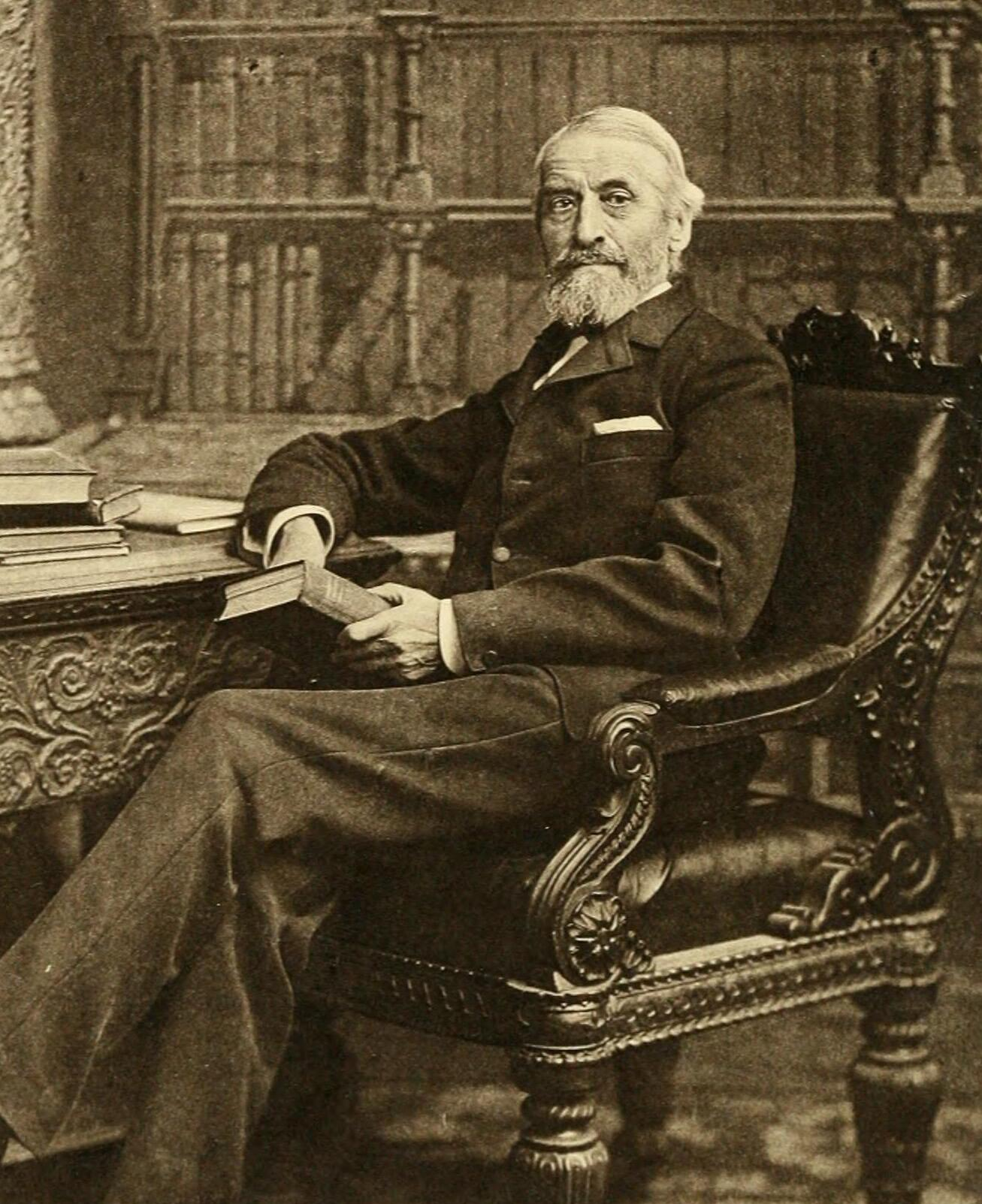
- Spofford, c. 1894

Librarian of Congress
- In office December 31, 1864 – July 1, 1897
- President: See list: Abraham Lincoln; Andrew Johnson; Ulysses S. Grant; Rutherford B. Hayes; James A. Garfield; Chester A. Arthur; Grover Cleveland; Benjamin Harrison; Grover Cleveland; William McKinley
- Preceded by: John Gould Stephenson
- Succeeded by: John Russell Young

Personal details
- Born: September 12, 1825 Gilmanton, New Hampshire, US
- Died: August 11, 1908 (aged 82) Holderness, New Hampshire, US
- Resting place: Rock Creek Cemetery, Washington, D.C., US
- Spouse: Sarah Partridge (m. 1852)

Ainsworth Rand Spofford (September 12, 1825 – August 11, 1908) was the sixth librarian of Congress. He oversaw the expansion of the Library of Congress (LOC) into a national library and placed it in charge of the national copyright system, allowing it to receive a copy of all works copyrighted in the US. He also oversaw the lengthy construction and move to the Thomas Jefferson Building, allowing the LOC to leave its severely overcrowded space in the United States Capitol.

Born to a Presbyterian minister in New Hampshire, he spent much of his childhood on the island of Martha's Vineyard, where he apprenticed for a local bookbinder. He was tutored at home due to poor health. He left the island in 1845, settling in Cincinnati, Ohio, and finding work as a bookstore clerk. He was inspired by the works of transcendentalists and became connected to local radicals and abolitionists, founding the Literary Club of Cincinnati in 1849. He became a business partner of the store, and was able to attract Ralph Waldo Emerson and Theodore Parker as lecturers there. After beginning work as a journalist, he served as a war correspondent in Washington, D.C after the outbreak of the American Civil War.

While in Washington, Spofford became acquainted with the librarian of Congress, physician John Gould Stephenson, who was a brother to a fellow Literary Club member. He appointed Spofford as his assistant librarian, who served as the library's de facto director for most of the war. Stephenson resigned in 1864 and Abraham Lincoln appointed Spofford as librarian of Congress in December. He began a rapid expansion plan, tripling the library's shelf space and acquiring major collections. Copyright management, which he pushed for the LOC to take over, occupied much of his tenure.

The growing collection acquired through copyright laws led to the library exhausting its shelf space, and Spofford pushed for a new building. Although an architectural plan was selected in 1873, debate on its location and features continued through the 1880s. Construction of the new building began in earnest in the 1890s. Congressional hearings on the reorganization of the LOC were held in conjunction with the move to the new building. The American Library Association saw Spofford as unsuitable for managing the growing national library. He became the chief assistant to his successor, John Russell Young, in 1897. He continued serving under Young's successor Herbert Putnam until his death in 1908.

== Early life and career ==
Ainsworth Rand Spofford was born in Gilmanton, New Hampshire, on September 12, 1825. He was the sixth child of Reverend Luke Ainsworth Spofford, a Presbyterian minister, and his wife Greta Rand Spofford. Ainsworth's father transferred between various other congregations during his youth. He spent much of his childhood at his father's parish in Chilmark, Massachusetts, on the island of Martha's Vineyard. While on Martha's Vineyard, he briefly worked as an apprentice for a local bookbinder. While his father barred him from secular books, he read them in secret; he later recounted that the first money he ever earned was spent on purchasing a copy of Charles Dickens's The Pickwick Papers and a volume of Shakespeare's works. He briefly attended Williston Seminary in Easthampton, Massachusetts, in training as a Presbyterian minister. His father and older brother Henry were both graduates of Amherst College, but Ainsworth himself was unable to attend due to "weak eyes and lungs", and was instead tutored at home by his brothers.

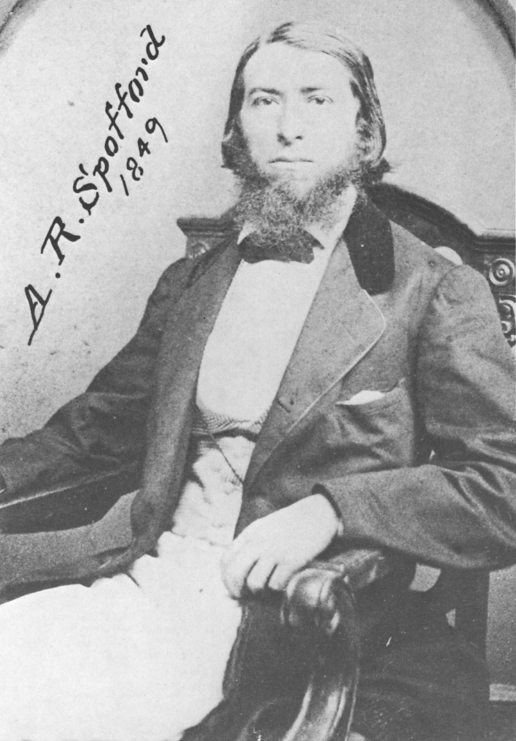
Spofford in 1849

=== Cincinnati ===
In 1843, an outbreak of tuberculosis hit the Spofford family, killing two. They left the island in 1845, moving to Newburgh, New York. Henry and Ainsworth moved out at this time, with the latter settling in Cincinnati, Ohio, where he was employed as a bookstore clerk for publisher Elizabeth D. Truman. Spofford read frequently while working in Cincinnati, and was introduced to the works of New England transcendentalists such as Ralph Waldo Emerson and Nathaniel Hawthorne.

Truman's store became a gathering place for young radicals in Cincinnati; Spofford became a staunch abolitionist and Free Soiler, and alienated his father through his transcendentalist and unitarian spiritual views. In October 1849, Spofford and a group of friends founded the Literary Club of Cincinnati, with Spofford as its first president. He became close acquaintances with club members Reuben H. Stephenson and Rutherford B. Hayes. Other prominent members during Spofford's time as president included activist Henry B. Blackwell, politician and jurist Salmon P. Chase, philosopher Moncure Conway, attorney Stanley Matthews, poet Thomas Buchanan Read, academic John Stallo, and jurist Alphonso Taft. Spofford stayed a member of the club for twelve years, later calling it the "most valuable part of my education".

In 1851, Spofford became a business partner of the bookstore, which was renamed Truman & Spofford. The firm published 15 books and pamphlets between 1851 and 1859. Twice a year, Spofford made trips to Boston to purchase books and meet with other publishers; he took this opportunity to attend lectures by Emerson and Theodore Parker. In April 1850, Spofford convinced Emerson through a petition to come to Cincinnati as part of a literary tour. Over the following years, he arranged tours for a number of other noteworthy lecturers, including Parker and Bronson Alcott. Spofford married Sarah Partridge, a schoolteacher from Franklin, Massachusetts, on September 15, 1852.

Truman & Spofford made its first publication, an anonymous pamphlet titled The Higher Law Tried by Reason and Authority: An Argument Pro and Con in 1851. This consisted of a speech made by Spofford to the Literary Club and a rebuttal from several months later. In his section of the book, Spofford argues that the human conscience has a duty to go against unjust written laws such as the Fugitive Slave Act. Shortly afterward, an edition featuring only Spofford's essay was published in New York City. Emerson enjoyed Spofford's work, writing that he could not write his own views on the subject without making the "most unblushing plagiarisms" of the essay.

=== Journalism ===
Spofford continued writing while working at the bookstore, publishing an essay on the works of Victor Hugo in an 1855 issue of the literary magazine North American Review and a series of anonymous articles on Ohio politics for the New York Evening Post in 1858. The Panic of 1857 greatly disrupted his business; Truman & Spofford became a wholesale supplier of textbooks and stationery, but closed in early 1859. In January 1859, Spofford was hired as an associate editor and chief editorial writer for the Cincinnati Daily Commercial, a local Republican paper which had previously republished his articles for the Evening Post. Through the Literary Club, Spofford was friends with Murat Halstead, the paper's editor-in-chief. At this time, the paper had the highest circulation of any in the Ohio Valley.

Spofford frequently wrote on literary topics for the Daily Commercial. His first editorial after joining the paper criticized the city librarian for poor book-purchasing habits. Other editorials in his first month at the paper touched on political parties, abolitionism, lecturing, copyright systems, and literary style. He also frequently wrote on libraries, discussing laws for school libraries and best practices for selecting books for inclusion. In one February 1860 column, he discussed the British library movement alongside the text of the Public Libraries Act 1855, advocating for similar legislation in Ohio. He criticized writers such as Walt Whitman, whom he wrote had an "utter contempt for expression" and "gross and obtrusive animalism which disgusts all intellectual men". Spofford also wrote partisan editorials, condemning figures such as the secessionist Texan senator Louis Wigfall.

Spofford traveled to Washington, D.C., in 1861 to report on the presidential inauguration of Abraham Lincoln. In the first week after his arrival on January 16, Spofford wrote six dispatches and five long-form letters to the Daily Commercial, all under his pseudonym of "Sigma". He was strongly partisan in his coverage, praising Lincoln and the abolitionist movement while attacking the Democrats. On his return to Cincinnati after the inauguration, the Battle of Fort Sumter and the outbreak of the Civil War prompted the Literary Club to form an infantry company and Spofford to return to Washington as a war correspondent after about three months. His columns expressed increasing frustration with the Union Army's inaction during the first months of the war. He was caught up in the First Battle of Bull Run while reporting and had to run to safety.

== Assistant librarian ==
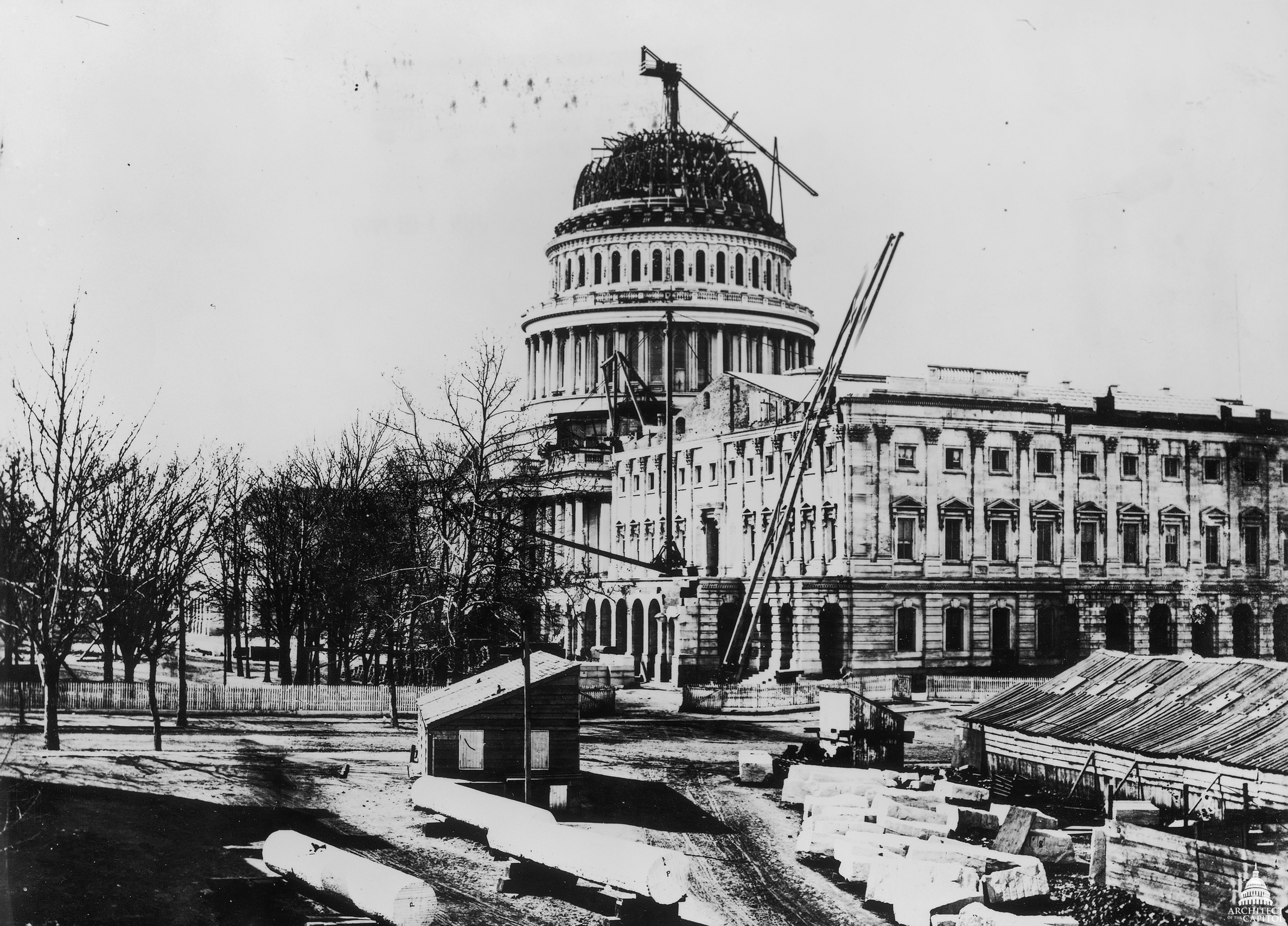
The United States Capitol with its dome under construction, early 1860s. The Library of Congress occupied a portion of the building until 1897.

While working as a war correspondent in 1861, Spofford had begun to make frequent trips to the Library of Congress (LOC) at the United States Capitol. After the Battle of Bull Run, he initially planned to stay in Cincinnati, but reconsidered after he was offered the position of assistant librarian by John Gould Stephenson, the newly-appointed librarian of Congress and the brother of Literary Club member Reuben Stephenson. Stephenson was an Indiana physician with little interest in library duties; Spofford described him in 1862 as a "thorough good fellow" with "no special knowledge of books". Lincoln had made him the librarian of Congress in a politically-motivated appointment at the encouragement of Senator Henry S. Lane.

Spofford had written about the library for the Daily Commercial, upset at what he saw as a very neglected institution. He was unsure whether to take the offered post; in an August 1861 letter to his wife, he listed nine reasons that he should decline the offer, and seventeen that he should accept. After a visit to Cincinnati, Spofford accepted Stephenson's offer and began looking for a home to rent in Washington. He published his last daily dispatch for the Daily Commercial on September 22, and around this time took up his duties as Stephenson's assistant librarian. Stephenson took a two-month leave from his duties as librarian the following day. He delegated most library work to Spofford, and instead served in various medical roles in the Union Army, and later as an aide-de-camp to a Union commander.

=== Service ===
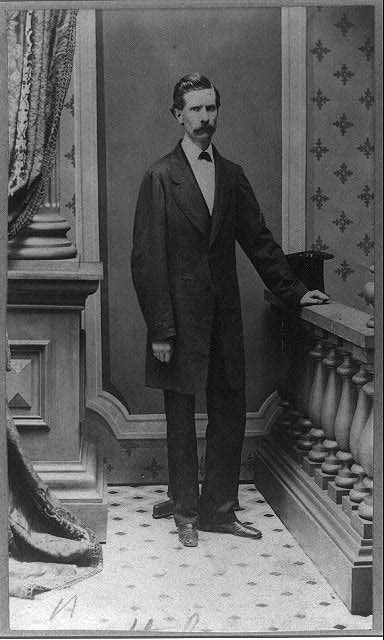
Librarian of Congress John Gould Stephenson delegated most of his duties to Spofford during his service.

Spofford served as the library's de facto director for most of the war. On December 16, 1861, an unsigned report to the Congressional Joint Committee on the Library was filed. Library historian John Y. Cole suggested that it may have been written by Spofford. This report was highly critical of the current condition of the library: it described "remarkable deficiencies in the collection", a lack of up-to-date encyclopedias and newspapers, large quantities of dust, and many books needing repairs or binding. The author also suggested that the interior of the library be redesigned, advocating that its dusty carpet be replaced with marble flooring. The new flooring was installed in 1863, and the library's ventilation system was expanded.

As assistant librarian, Spofford went on book-buying trips to various bookstores and publishers in Philadelphia, New York, and Boston, purchasing new books at a rate significantly cheaper than the previous average. He also worked privately as a book-purchasing agent for several Ohio congressmen he was friends with: Rutherford B. Hayes, Salmon P. Chase, James A. Garfield, and John Sherman. He compiled a new catalog for the library in 1864, arranging it alphabetically by author as opposed to the subject-based classification used by previous catalogs. From 1861 to 1864, the library collections grew from 63,000 to 82,000 volumes. Due to his large-scale purchases of new books, finding space for the collection began to pose a problem. He was upset at the presence of what he deemed "rubbish" among the collection, and sought permission to auction off unneeded books to finance new purchases.

Spofford developed a reputation for political neutrality, and distanced himself from association with the Republican Party after he began working for the library. He continued writing for the Daily Commercial during his service as Assistant Librarian, often criticizing Congress for being paid too much. In a private letter to Henry Blackwell, he described himself as "despising, perhaps unduly, the whole tribe and generation of politicians", and as such "systematically avoided social opportunities and engrossed myself in intellectual pursuits".

In his writings for the Daily Commercial, Spofford bemoaned the "crowded condition" of the library within the large Capitol complex. He wrote that the United States would lack a true national library "until Congress shall take a more liberal view of the value and importance of such a collection". Emerson visited Washington in January 1862, and Spofford gave him a tour of the library. Spofford told him that the library was in poor condition, as it had "been under Southern domination, and as under dead men".

By the late summer of 1864, it had become clear that Stephenson was going to resign as librarian, for unclear reasons possibly related to financial misfeasance. Although Spofford had been serving as assistant librarian, he faced competition to become the librarian of Congress. His main rival for the position was Charles Lanman, a writer who served as the librarian of the House of Representatives. Spofford campaigned by soliciting every sitting congressman for an endorsement; this resulted in endorsements from 22 senators and 87 representatives, which he forwarded to Lincoln on the 22nd of December. The same day, Stephenson submitted his resignation. Spofford explained that the endorsements were necessary, as he had eschewed political work for his librarian duties. Lincoln appointed him as the sixth librarian of Congress on December 31, the same day Stephenson's resignation took effect.

== Librarian of Congress ==
Spofford embarked on a rapid plan of expansion soon after taking office. At the start of the year, the library employed seven staff members, and had an annual appropriation of around $20,000 (equivalent to $420,650 in 2025). Spofford had developed good relations with the members of the Joint Committee on the Library. As such, the committee largely followed his ideas for the library. In October 1864, Spofford had suggested to the Secretary of the Treasury that the library should be granted an additional $160,000 (equivalent to $3,365,220 in 2025) to allow for the construction of two new wings. This was confirmed by Congress in a March 1865 appropriations bill, allowing for the library to triple its shelf space. Spofford became a trusted source of information on literary manners; in his diary, Garfield noted that another congressman had proclaimed that "I don't read books, I read Spofford." According to an obituary for Spofford, the officer and writer Lew Wallace consulted Spofford while searching for inspirations for his novel Ben-Hur.

Spofford was an advocate for the LOC to become a national library. The concept of a national library for the United States had been pursued a decade prior by Smithsonian Institution librarian Charles Coffin Jewett, who envisioned a nationwide library system centered on the Smithsonian Library. This plan was staunchly opposed by Smithsonian secretary Joseph Henry, who felt another institution would be better suited, eventually leading to Jewett's dismissal. Unlike previous proposals, Spofford's conception of the LOC did not directly tie it to local libraries, instead seeing it as an independent institution along the lines of the "great European national libraries" such as the British Museum.

=== New acquisitions ===
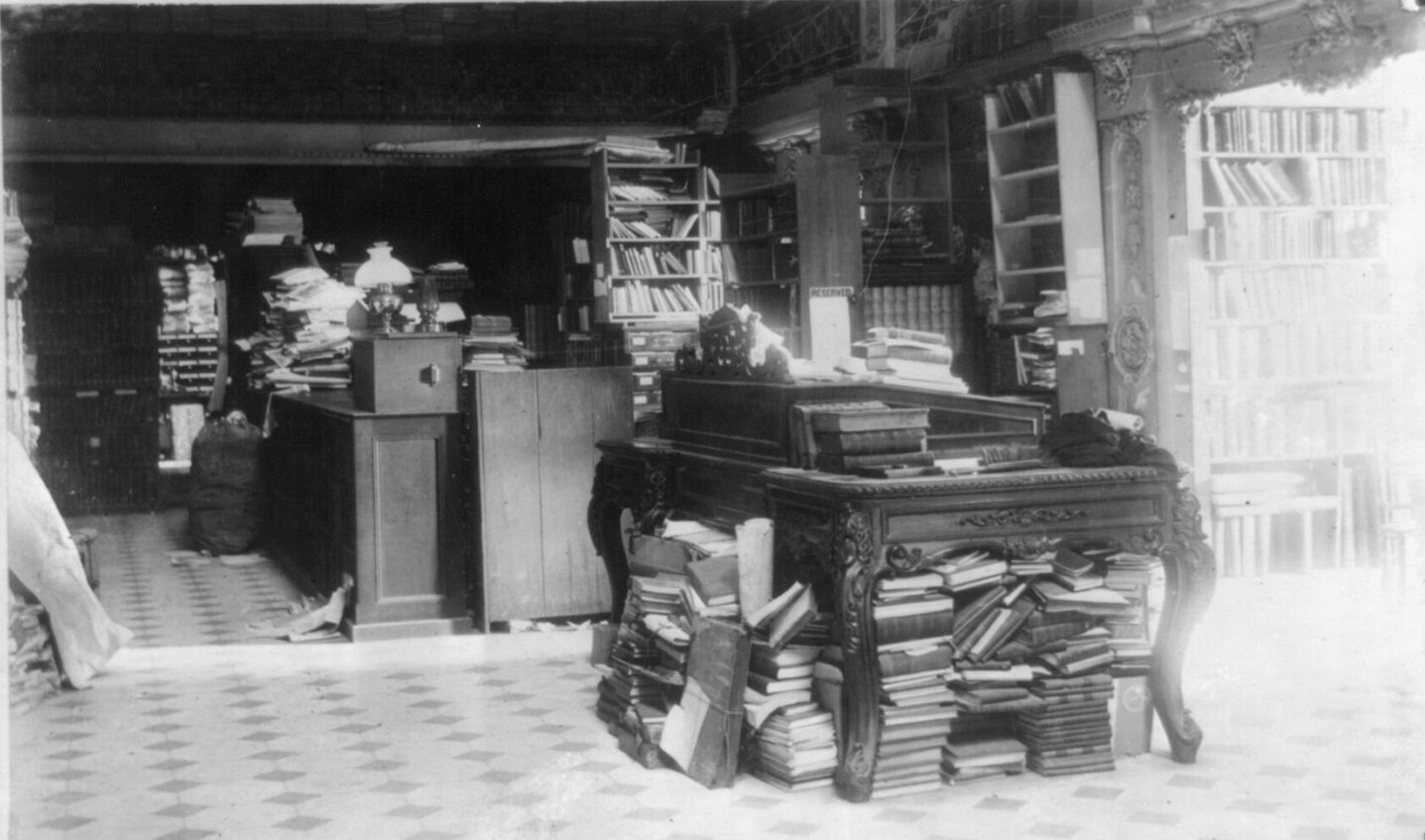
Spofford's desk at the Library of Congress, c. 1880s

In March 1865, Henry suggested that the Smithsonian's 40,000-volume library, including large numbers of scientific works and publications from learned societies, be incorporated as a department of the LOC. The Smithsonian Board of Regents met with the Library Committee in February 1866 to discuss the transfer. That April, President Andrew Johnson officially authorized the move, which Spofford wrote would "insure the rapid growth of our great and truly national library". As the library collection grew, Spofford maintained discretion over its content. After congressional objections, he successfully defended the acquisition of the quote collection Lover's Dictionary and the medical text Abuses of the Sexual Function.

The same year, Spofford became interested in acquiring another large collection: the archives of editor and historian Peter Force. The two had become acquainted through book purchases, as they had traded duplicate volumes from their libraries. Force's collection included around 22,500 books, 40,000 pamphlets, and nearly 1,000 bound volumes of newspapers. It also included 161 incunabula (books printed before 1500). Spofford visited Force's house daily to survey the collection and compile a report on it. He wrote to historian and diplomat George Bancroft, who agreed that a similar opportunity would not arise in the future, but was skeptical that Congress would be willing to pay US$100,000 (equivalent to $2,304,000 in 2025) to acquire it.

Spofford began to lobby for the purchase, contacting congressmen and calling the collection the "embodied spirit of American history". He noted that it would help the library surpass the British Museum in having the largest collection of books related to the United States. The Joint Committee unanimously supported the purchase, and Congress approved it as part of a March 1867 appropriations bill. This was the Library of Congress's first acquisition of such a size since the collection was rebuilt after an 1851 fire.

In 1867, Spofford obtained permission from the Library Committee to begin a document exchange program with foreign governments. Johnson approved the resolution in March. It required fifty extra copies to be made of all government documents, which would be exchanged by the Smithsonian for foreign state documents; any obtained through this program would be deposited in the LOC. By December of that year, exchange arrangements with nine different countries had been approved. However, the government printers did not begin printing the extra copies required for the program until a joint resolution of Congress in July 1868. The following year, the library received 933 volumes from the Qing dynasty in exchange for publications and seeds offered by the United States delegation in Beijing, beginning the library's collection of Chinese works.

In an October 1869 address to the American Social Science Association, Spofford declared the library had two tasks to accomplish in order to "fulfill its usefulness": to complete its catalogue, and to extend its hours into the evenings. The two-volume Catalogue of the Library of Congress: Index of Subjects was completed that year. Spofford did extend the library's hours, keeping it open from 9 AM to 4 PM on weekdays regardless of whether Congress was in session, but his proposal to keep it open during the evening was voted down by the Library Committee. The Boston librarian Justin Winsor surveyed the library in 1869 and concluded that it was the largest library in the United States, with approximately 175,000 volumes. Eight years prior, it had been the sixth largest. (Note: Surpassed by the Boston Athenæum, the Harvard Library, the Astor Library, the Boston Public Library, and the Yale University Library.)

=== Copyright law ===
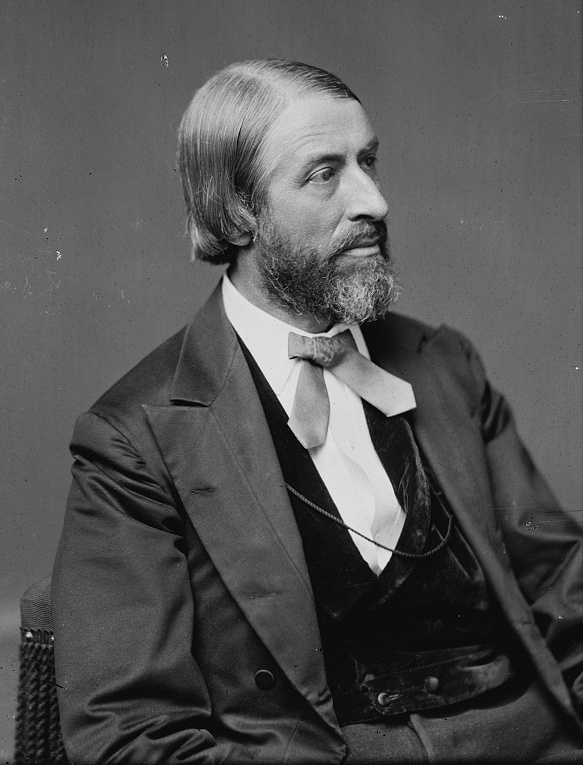
1870s portrait of Spofford

Prior to 1859, the United States copyright law had required copyrighted works to be deposited with various federal offices, including the Office of the Secretary of State, the Smithsonian Institution, and the LOC. These duties were then transferred to the Patent Office, under the support of Librarian of Congress John Silva Meehan. Spofford considered this change to be a mistake. As Congress considered a bill extending copyright protection to photographs in 1865, he gained the support of the Joint Committee to restore the library's copyright duties. In March 1865, the copyright protections were passed and publishers were again required to deposit their copyrighted works with the library.

The 1865 bill lacked any enforcement mechanisms, leading many publishers to decline to send copies to the library. Spofford corresponded with various district court offices to obtain transcripts of their copyright records. In 1867, at Spofford's behest, Congress passed a law levying a $25 (equivalent to $580 in 2025) fee on publishers who failed to deposit copies of their copyrighted works with the library. However, due to the decentralized nature of the American copyright system, many works remained undeposited. In his 1868 annual report, he noted that "even with the utmost diligence it is found impracticable to secure for the Library all the copyright publications that are issued."

After a push for copyright reform by the Patent Office, Spofford began to advocate for the library to take over its duties of receiving copyright applications. Patent commissioner Samuel S. Fisher was a friend of Spofford, being a fellow member of the Cincinnati Literary Club, and happily agreed to transfer these responsibilities to the LOC. Spofford wrote a letter arguing for his proposal and sent it to various publishers and literary magazines, many of which reprinted it in agreement. Rhode Island representative Thomas Jenckes supported the proposal and argued for it in Congress. After it was approved through an act of Congress in 1870, President Ulysses S. Grant signed it into law on July 8. The legislation tasked the library with "all acts and duties required by law touching copyrights", and raised Spofford's annual salary to US$4,000 (equivalent to $102,000 in 2025).

=== Planning for new library building ===
It is impossible to believe that the legislature of a great and intelligent people will continue to neglect making some suitable provision to preserve and extend this noble collection. If left in its present condition, the neglect of Congress will soon place its Librarian in the unhappy predicament of presiding over the greatest chaos in America; but if permanently provided for, with a liberal foresight for the future, this Library will become not only one of the foremost ornaments of the national capital, but a perpetual honor to the United States.

— Spofford, 1875 annual report of the Library of Congress

The new copyright legislation swelled the rate of new acquisitions, with over 11,000 in 1871 and almost 20,000 in 1872. With shelf space limited even with the two new wings, Spofford began to campaign for the construction of a new building for the LOC, separate from the Capitol. The majority of his 1872 annual report described his wishes for the building. He said that overcrowding had made the library "comparatively an unfit place for students", and that there was an "absolute necessity of erecting a separate building for the Library and the copyright department conjoined". He emphasized the need for a fireproof and expansive library which could incorporate future expansions. He called for a building which could house at least 3 million volumes, predicting that the library would hold around 2.5 million books by 1975. (Note: This was a significant underestimate; the library reached 16 million volumes by the 1970s.) Inspired by the British Museum, he suggested that the building include a large central reading room, with five "apartments" reserved for copyright, maps, fine arts, periodicals, and packaging. This report formed the basis for the architectural plans for the new building over the following decades.

Spofford appealed to nationalistic sympathies in his advocacy for the building, writing that without a new library building, "American writers will be without the means of surveying the whole field trodden by their predecessors". The Library Committee agreed with Spofford's wishes, and the Senate formed a three-man commission to manage the design and construction, consisting of Spofford, committee chairman Timothy O. Howe and Senate Committee on Public Buildings chairman Justin S. Morrill. The commission announced a competition for the design of the building in August 1873, with specifications outlined by Spofford. By late December, the committee had received 27 submissions. It unanimously approved of a Renaissance Revival design by architects John L. Smithmeyer and Paul J. Pelz.

Despite the commission's choice, Howe reopened the contest the following year, after visiting Europe and finding the previous design "small and plain". Smithmeyer and Pelz submitted designs in a variety of Renaissance Revival styles, as well as Romanesque and Gothic. Congress could not agree on an ideal location for the library; some senators favored an extension of the existing Capitol building, while supporters of a separate building proposed various new locations. Spofford had assumed that the committee would quickly select a plot across the east plaza of the Capitol. Spofford pressed Congress to act quickly, through what historian John Y. Cole described as "nationalistic rhetoric, pleading, flattery, and practical logic", seeing the construction of a new library as an implied result of the 1870 copyright law.

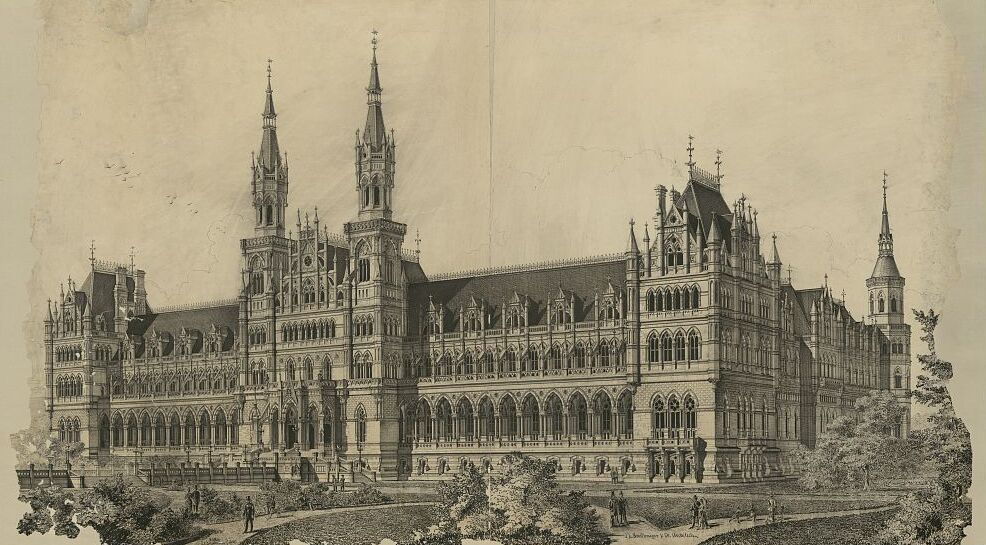
1875 rendering of John Smithmeyer and Paul Pelz's proposal for the National Library building

Shelf space was exhausted by 1875, forcing new books to be piled on the floor. Spofford took a desperate tone in his 1875 annual report, calling on Congress to act quickly to avoid future "chaos". The Library Committee, headed by Howe, deplored the delays in constructing new accommodations, describing it as "almost insane, if not wicked" and calling for the construction of a new building on the grounds of the United States Botanic Garden.

Although he was not associated with any particular political party, Spofford had shrewd political abilities and close ties to many politicians, using these connections to push for a national library. He occasionally served as a speechwriter and editor for his political contacts. At the founding meeting of the American Library Association (ALA) in 1876, he pushed through a resolution to ask Congress to fund the library construction. After the election of his old friend Rutherford B. Hayes as president that year, Spofford called on him to advocate for the library. As a result, he called for the enlargement of the library in his 1878 State of the Union Address.

Senators Daniel W. Voorhees and Justin S. Morrill were friends of Spofford and frequently used the library. They advocated for development of the new building to continue, and by 1880 became the heads of a new committee, the Joint Select Committee on Additional Accommodations of the Library of Congress. In 1881, the committee selected Spofford's preferred architects, Smithmeyer and Pelz, who produced a plan largely following their 1873 design. Some members of the ALA took issue to Smithmeyer's plan; William Frederick Poole rejected Smithmeyer's conception of the library as a tourist attraction and "museum of books", advocating instead for a strictly utilitarian approach to avoid a "noisy army of sightseers".

The project continued to receive support from senators, who sought to surpass the British Museum and the French Bibliothèque Nationale. Senator Thomas Bayard introduced a joint resolution to send Spofford to Europe to inspect various national libraries. Spofford was hesitant to accept due to his busy copyright duties, and convinced Voorhees to send Smithmeyer in his place in 1882. Spofford listed a series of features for Smithmeyer to examine, such as shelf arrangement, reader facilities, and ventilation systems. After his return, Smithmeyer published his findings in a pamphlet as a rebuttal against Poole. Spofford supported Smithmeyer, writing that the national library should not be "dwarfed to the dimensions of a prolonged series of packing boxes". The broader librarian community generally backed Spofford and Smithmeyer's plans, and Poole dropped his opposition.

The Joint Committee mainly focused on Morrill's proposal for a site on East Capitol Street. However, this was interrupted by a proposal to raise the Capitol dome by 50 ft (15 m) and house the library within an expanded rotunda. After the committee's inquiry, former Capitol engineer Montgomery C. Meigs called the proposal a "dangerous and perhaps fatal enterprise", and the plans for expanding the Capitol were again abandoned. On April 15, 1886, Congress passed a bill to construct the library according to Smithmeyer and Pelz's plans at the East Capitol Street site. However, funding for the purchase of the lot still needed to be improved. Spofford was able to push through this funding on the final day of the Congressional session, rushing the bill to President Grover Cleveland for signing while he was eating lunch. Spofford wrote to a friend that he was the "happiest man in Washington".

=== Construction ===
A new three-man committee was established to oversee the construction, consisting of Spofford, Architect of the Capitol Edward Clark, and Secretary of the Interior Lucius Q. C. Lamar. Clark and Smithmeyer feuded over the location of the building within the lot, and shortly after groundbreaking in 1887, work was halted after a personal dispute between Smithmeyer and the project's cement supplier. The supplier accused Smithmeyer of intentionally underestimating the cost of construction, prompting a Congressional investigation and hearings. The construction committee became dysfunctional. Spofford defended Smithmeyer, but had no time to oversee the construction; Clark wished to resign; and the new interior secretary William F. Vilas sought to transfer the job of construction to the Army Corps of Engineers. Smithmeyer was heavily criticized in the national press and was eventually fired. The construction committee was dissolved.

Congress tasked the chief of the Army Corps of Engineers, Thomas Lincoln Casey Sr., with managing the construction. Together with Pelz and Spofford, Casey made two plans for the building, one an expanded version made in the anticipation of additional funding; the expanded version was approved in 1890. Spofford asked Casey to make the design as large as possible and appropriate for expansion in the future. Casey appointed Bernard R. Green as the construction engineer. The cornerstone of the building was laid in August 1890, and construction continued rapidly. Spofford himself was unable to dedicate much time to the management of the library or its construction; at least three-quarters of his time was spent in his copyright duties, managing records, correspondence, and certificates.

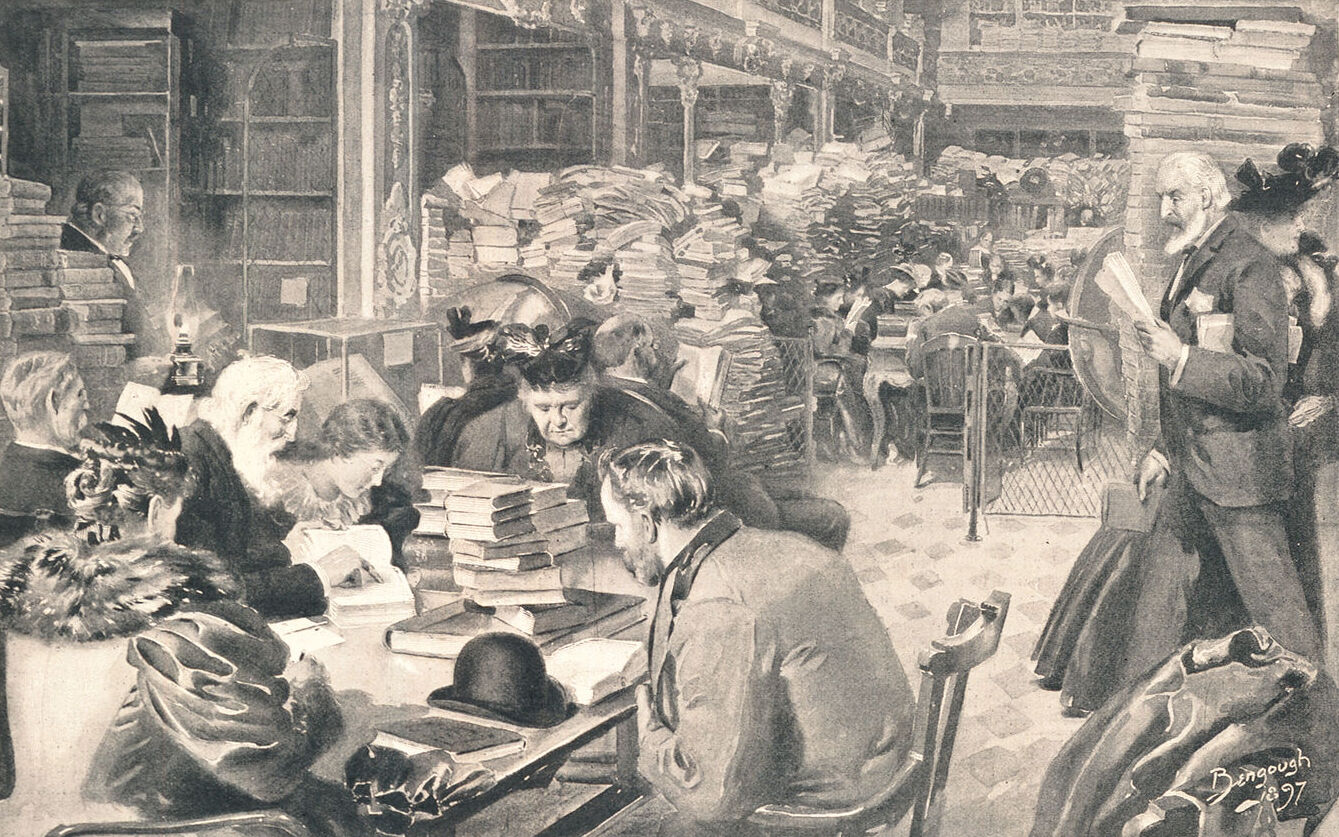
1897 Harper's Weekly illustration showing the overcrowded Library of Congress reading room, with Spofford visible at right

Limited space for books in the old library continued to frustrate Spofford. He estimated in the annual report for 1890 that the library now held about 650,000 books and 207,000 pamphlets. As construction continued in 1891, Spofford noted that the haphazard organization and lack of shelf space in the old library led to it becoming very slow to retrieve books. After he pressed Green to allow for quickly retrieving volumes from the new bookstacks, Green designed a system of nine-tier steel bookstacks incorporating pneumatic tubes and conveyor belts, the first time such technologies had been used in an American library. Spofford attended the World's Library Congress at the 1893 Columbian Exposition in Chicago to promote the new building.

Despite the successes in construction, Spofford struggled to secure funding for the library's functions. The library's budget for new acquisitions was similar to many smaller libraries across the United States due to its acquisitions through the copyright system. However, the library was understaffed for the copyright receipts it had to manage. When Spofford requested US$10,000 (equivalent to $372,000 in 2025) around 1894 to hire new copyright staff, Congress allotted him US$6,800 (equivalent to $253,000 in 2025). By 1896, the library held about 740,000 volumes, but could only store about 400,000 on the shelves of the old building.

=== 1896 hearings ===
Congress tasked Spofford in 1895 to make a report "touching a complete reorganization of the Library of Congress". Spofford's report, submitted in December 1896, called for the library to be divided into nine departments: books, periodicals, manuscripts, maps and charts, art, cataloging, binding, copyright, and the building superintendency. He argued that the Law Library should be split off and housed within the Capitol itself, alongside a reference library for Congress. He argued for doubling the library staff, from 42 to 97, noting that current number of staff was less than smaller world libraries without copyright duties, such as the Royal Prussian Library or even the Boston Public Library. He proposed that 39 of the new staff would be assigned to copyright duties.

In May 1896, the Senate passed a resolution calling for the Joint Committee on the Library to hold hearings on the condition of the LOC administration during the Congressional recess, seeking to create a new organizational framework to accompany the move to the new building. The committee assembled in November. This was the first time ALA delegates had testified with the congressional committee. It had been disinclined to influence Congress directly, deferring to Spofford, and had previously met in Washington only to support his efforts to construct the new building. The new ALA leadership had grown more favorable towards intervention in the LOC, having voted to create a six-member committee to represent the organization's vision for the library. Spofford served as the primary witness, accompanied by the six ALA delegates, including New York State Library director Melvil Dewey and Boston Public Library head Herbert Putnam. Although the members came from different backgrounds, the ALA delegates were quite uniform in their proposals for the LOC.

The ALA delegates advocated for a centralized catalog system and the implementation of interlibrary loans, seeing the LOC as ideally "a center to which the libraries of the whole country can turn for inspiration, guidance, and practical help". Spofford's work had not brought him into frequent contact with much of the American library community, and he did not share the ALA's vision for the library's importance to the broader American library system.

Although merit-based hiring in the civil service system had expanded since the 1880s, the staff of the LOC was under presidential and congressional influence for its appointments. Only 7 out of the 70 staff hired by Spofford during his tenure had prior library experience, and several of the staff had been relatives or friends of congressmen. The ALA emphasized the need for a professionally-educated staff and argued for an oversight committee composed of professional librarians. However, many congressional Republicans were unwilling to cede control over civil service staffing. After much debate, the Joint Committee voted to ensure the Librarian of Congress's oversight of staffing matters.

The reorganization of the LOC proceeded before the Joint Committee on the Library's report could be published. Spofford was called to testify before the Appropriations Committee in late 1896 alongside members of the Joint Committee. The two bodies disagreed on the future administration of the LOC. The Joint Committee proposed that it should be headed by a presidentially appointed director, with all other staff appointed by the Joint Committee itself. In contrast, the Appropriations Committee sought to preserve the Librarian of Congress's powers. Congress overwhelmingly sided with the latter proposal.

==== Manuscript theft ====
In the summer of 1896, LOC clerks Lewis Turner and Philip McElhone broke into Spofford's office to examine rare manuscripts, including many from Peter Force's collection. Realizing the value of the collection, they began stealing the documents in August, entering the office on Sundays and evenings to avoid encountering Spofford. The two sold the papers to autograph collector William E. Benjamin, claiming that much of the collection was inherited from McElhone's aunt, with the rest privately purchased. They made about 15 trips to Spofford's office, stealing autographs and letters from various Founding Fathers. The collection had never been catalogued, and only Spofford was particularly familiar with its contents. Benjamin became suspicious of the thieves after they provided him with George Washington's 1787 diary, and alerted several federal officials.

A Secret Service agent contacted Spofford in February 1897 and inquired about the diary. Spofford claimed to have seen it recently, but realized the large gaps in the Force collection while looking for it. He emphasized the importance of recovering the papers, but had no idea as to who may have stolen them. Benjamin informed the Secret Service of Turner and McElhone's identities, and returned the material he had purchased. Spofford served as a witness at their trials, testifying that the documents were indeed from the Force collection. Both thieves were punished with relatively small fines.

==== Replacement ====
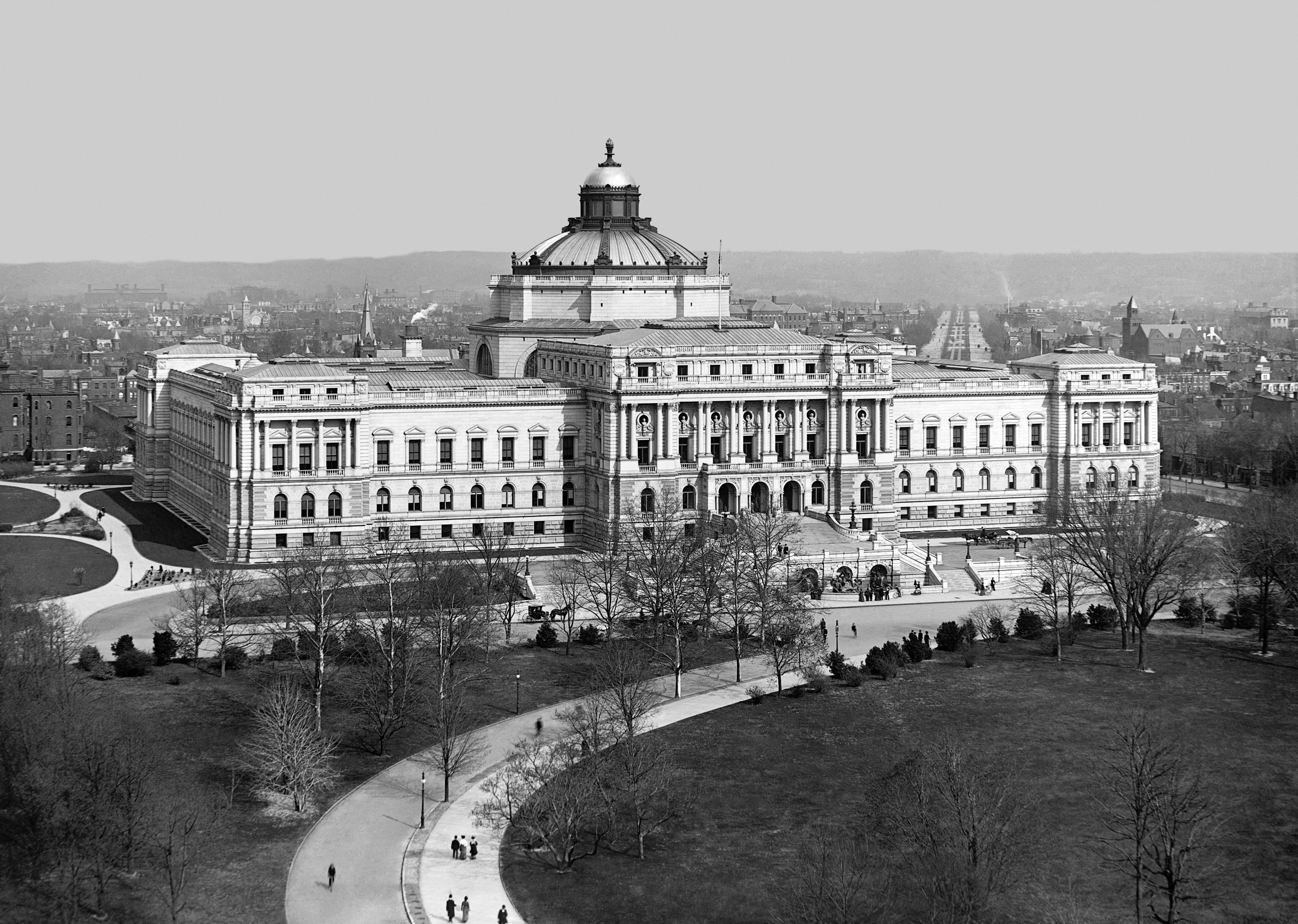
The completed Thomas Jefferson Building, c. 1902

Spofford was held in great esteem by the ALA; inaugural ALA president Justin Winsor named him the "official father of us all". However many members of the ALA had begun to see the aging Spofford as unsuitable for the role of Librarian of Congress during a period of rapid modernization. An article in the association's Library Journal declared that Spofford "has been so busy with the mass of detail which he has under taken to handle that he has not trained himself as an executive for this kind of work, nor been able to keep in touch with the modern developments of library organization and practice". Putnam called for the LOC's duties to be expanded beyond what Spofford as "one man and mortal" could be expected to perform, emphasizing that an ideal Librarian of Congress should be chosen for their administrative skill rather than scholarly ability, comparing the position to that of the president of a university.

Following the success of the Appropriations Committee bill in February 1897, the committee asked for presidential confirmation of a new librarian. The calling of a special session of Congress in March by the newly-inaugurated William McKinley delayed the anticipated move to the new building, but materials began to be transferred the following month. On May 4, McKinley alerted his friend, the journalist and diplomat John Russell Young, that he was about to nominate a new Librarian of Congress. Young suspected that he had been chosen for the position, but did not put his own name forward, writing that he "would rather be paralyzed than in any way disturb Spofford". According to the Evening Star, Spofford had informed McKinley that he did not wish to be renominated for the position. McKinley officially nominated Young on June 30, to wide agreement by Congress. Young took office on July 1. Having a friendly relationship with his predecessor, he appointed Spofford as his chief assistant librarian on the same day.

== Later life and death ==
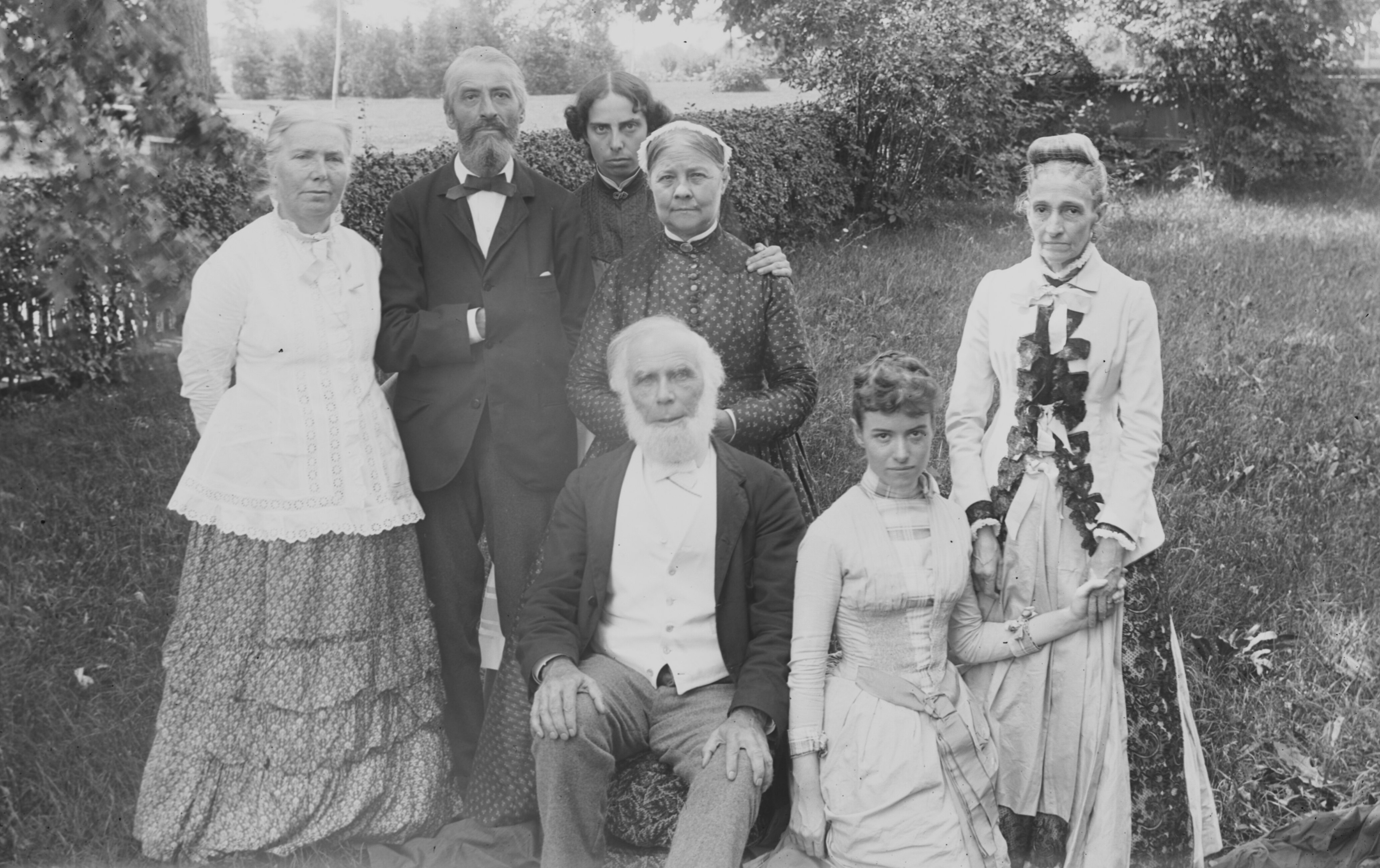
Spofford (second from left) with family, 1906

As chief assistant librarian, Spofford was no longer required to focus on the administrative duties which had occupied most of his time as librarian. He instead focused on acquiring materials for the library, taking two trips to Europe to do so. He wrote and lectured in his free time, publishing works such as A Book For All Readers, a guidebook to book collection and preservation, in 1900. In October 1899, he returned to Cincinnati to honor the 50th anniversary of the Literary Club, and made a speech reaffirming his view of a national library.

Spofford frequently served as acting librarian throughout Young's term. After Young's death in January 1899, Spofford continued to serve as chief assistant librarian to Young's successor, Putnam. The two enjoyed a close relationship; LOC staff member William W. Bishop called Putnam's relation to Spofford "deferential, affectionate, kindly, and considerate", and a "never-failing delight". Spofford died in Holderness, New Hampshire, on August 11, 1908, still in service as chief assistant librarian.

=== Legacy ===
Putnam honored Spofford as a pivotal figure for the LOC, declaring him a "valiant, persistent, forecasting" and "prophesying" figure in a 1950 address to the library. In 1927, chief assistant librarian Frederick W. Ashley wrote that more progress had been made in the 64 days after Spofford took office than had occurred in the Library's prior 64 years of existence. He divided his 1929 unpublished history of the library into three periods: prior to Spofford's librarianship, during his tenure, and after his retirement. Spofford received relatively little attention from historians in comparison to contemporary librarians such as Dewey and Poole. John Y. Cole wrote a dissertation on Spofford's early career in 1971, building on Ashley's ideas to argue that the 1865 to 1870 period was crucial to the library's development.

== Bibliography ==
=== As editor ===
- Spofford, Ainsworth Rand, ed. (1878–1889) Annual American Almanac and Treasury of Facts. 12 volumes.
- ___; Gibbon, Charles, ed. (1883) Library of Choice Literature. 10 volumes.
- ___; Weitenkampf, Frank; Lamberton, John Porter, ed. (1894–1895) Library of Historic Characters and Famous Events of All Nations. 10 volumes.
- ___; Shapley, Rufus Edmonds, ed. (1884–1894) The Library of Wit and Humor, Prose and Poetry: Selected From the Literature of All Times and Nations. 5 volumes.

=== As author ===
- Spofford, Ainsworth Rand. Practical Manual of Parliamentary Rules. (1884)
- ___. A Book For All Readers, Designed as an Aid to the Collection, Use, and Preservation of Books and Formation of Public and Private Libraries. (1900)

== Notes ==
=== Works cited ===
- Aikin, Jane (2010). "Histories of the Library of Congress". Libraries & the Cultural Record. 45 (1): 5–24. JSTOR 20720636.
- Carter, Constance (1976). "John Gould Stephenson: Largely Known and Much Liked". The Quarterly Journal of the Library of Congress. 33 (2): 76–91. JSTOR 29781670.
- Cole, John Y. (1971a). "Ainsworth Spofford and the Copyright Law of 1870". The Journal of Library History. 6 (1): 34–40. JSTOR 25540276.
- Cole, John Y. (1971b). Ainsworth Spofford and the 'National Library' (PhD thesis). George Washington University.
- Cole, John Y. (1972a). "A National Monument for a National Library: Ainsworth Rand Spofford and the New Library of Congress, 1871-1897". Records of the Columbia Historical Society. 71/72: 468–507. JSTOR 40067786.
- Cole, John Y. (1972b). "The Main Building of the Library of Congress: A Chronology, 1871–1965". The Quarterly Journal of the Library of Congress. 29 (4): 267–270. JSTOR 29781519.
- Cole, John Y. (1976). "Ainsworth Rand Spofford: The Valiant and Persistent Librarian of Congress". Quarterly Journal of the Library of Congress. 33 (2): 92–115. JSTOR 29781671.
- Cole, John Y. (1979). For Congress and the Nation: A Chronological History of the Library of Congress Through 1975. Washington: Library of Congress.
- Conaway, James (2000). America's Library: The Story of the Library of Congress, 1800–2000. Yale University Press. ISBN 9780300083088.
- Hollis, C. Carroll (1965). "A New England Outpost: As Revealed in Some Unpublished Letters of Emerson, Parker, and Alcott to Ainsworth Spofford". The New England Quarterly. 38 (1): 65–85. doi:10.2307/363883. JSTOR 363883.
- Mearns, David C. (1947). The Story Up to Now: the Library of Congress 1800-1946. Washington: United States Government Printing Office. ISBN 9780839812722. OCLC 447440.
- Morgan, James Dudely (1908). "Ainsworth Rand Spofford, 1825–1908". Proceedings of the Washington Academy of Sciences. 10: 237–239. JSTOR 24525347.
- Ostrowski, Carl (2010). "'The Choice of Books': Ainsworth Rand Spofford, the Ideology of Reading, and Literary Collections at the Library of Congress in the 1870s". Libraries & the Cultural Record. 45 (1): 70–84. JSTOR 20720640.
- Purcell, Aaron D. (1999). "Abstractions of Justice: The Library of Congress's Great Manuscripts Robbery, 1896–1897". The American Archivist. 62 (2): 325–345. JSTOR 40294126.
- Rosenberg, Jane A. (1986). "Foundation for Service: The 1896 Hearings on the Library of Congress". The Journal of Library History. 21 (1): 107–130. JSTOR 25541683.
- Rosenberg, Jane A. (1991). "Patronage and Professionals: The Transformation of the Library of Congress Staff, 1890-1907". Libraries & Culture. 26 (2): 251–268. JSTOR 25542336.
- Wood, Richard G. (1949). "Librarian-in-Arms: The Career of John G. Stephenson". Library Quarterly. 19 (4): 263–269. doi:10.1086/617572. JSTOR 4303804.
