= Alexandre Vattemare =

French ventriloquist and philanthropist (1796–1864)

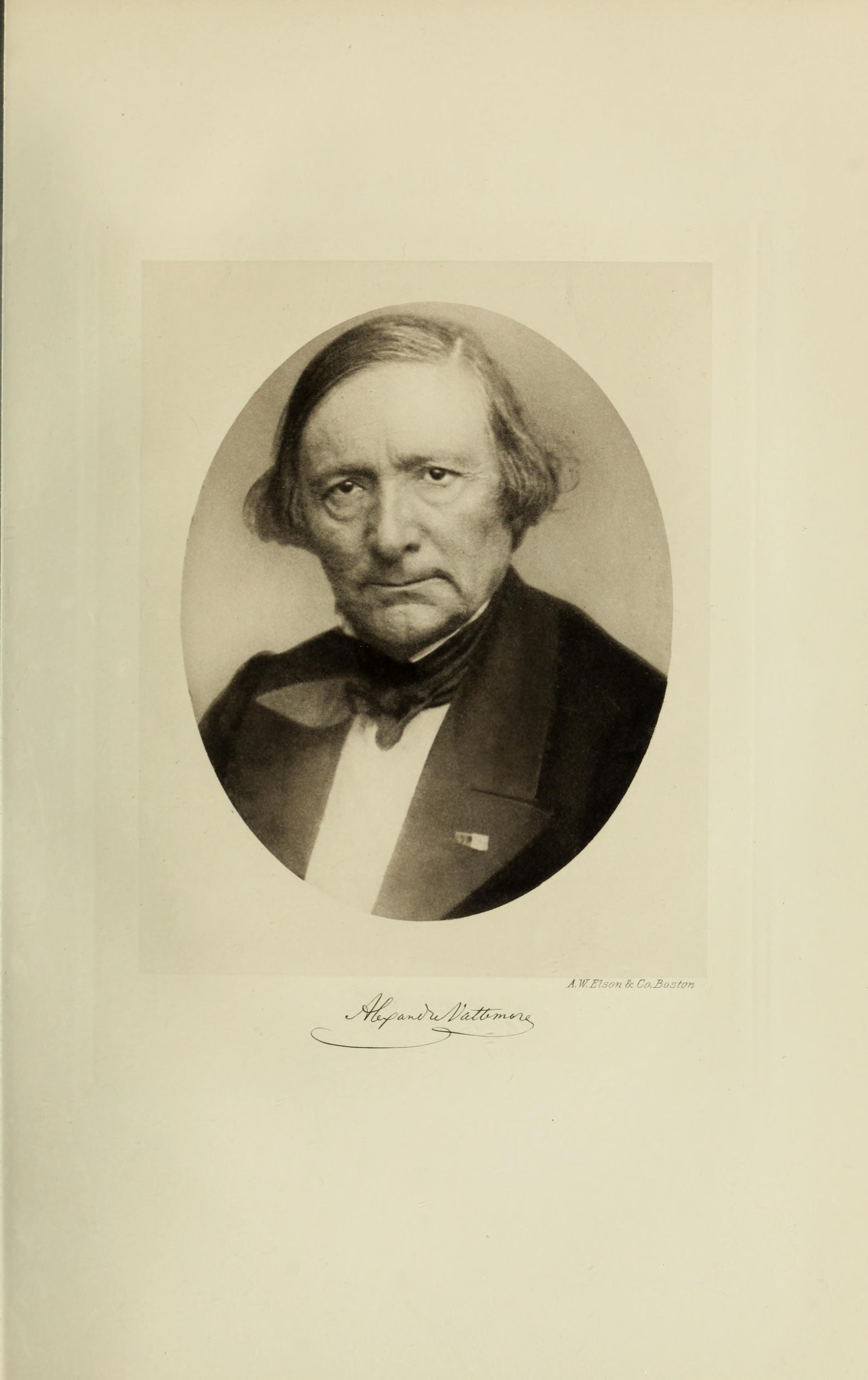
Photo of Alexandre Vattemare in The Public Library of the city of Boston: a history by Horace G. Wadlin, 1910, 1911

Nicolas Marie Alexandre Vattemare (1796 in Paris – 1864), also known under the stage name Monsieur Alexandre, was a French ventriloquist and philanthropist who created the first international system for the exchange of items among libraries and museums.

== Career as ventriloquist ==
Around age seven, Vattemare discovered a talent for ventriloquism and the ability to imitate sounds. He trained as a surgeon, but was refused a diploma after making cadavers seem to speak during surgical exercises. At age 18 he was placed in charge of some 300 to 400 typhus-afflicted Prussian prisoners of war, and in 1814, the soldiers asked that he accompany them to Berlin. Facing economic problems in Berlin, he decided to earn money as a ventriloquist, performing under the stage name Monsieur Alexandre. His career lasted from 1815 to 1835, during which he visited over 550 cities and performed before royalty including the Tsar of Russia and Queen Victoria. His performances did not use a dummy, but rather involved Vattemare presenting plays in which he portrayed all the characters, involving dozens of voices. Vattemare wrote his own comedic scripts, which he performed in French, German, and English. He gained acclaim and wealth through his ventriloquism, while becoming friends with famous writers and artists including Goethe, Lamartine, Pushkin, and Sir Walter Scott.

== Philanthropic activities and cultural exchange system ==
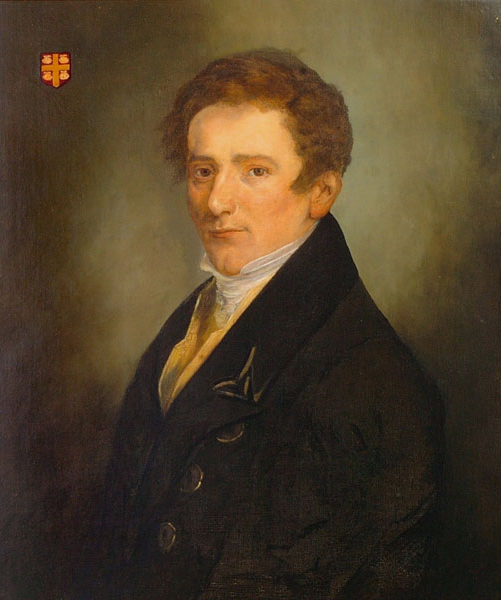
Painting of Alexandre Vattemare in 1826

After becoming famous and wealthy as a ventriloquist, Vattemare retired and spent the next 25 years as a philanthropist promoting free public libraries and the universal dissemination of culture. During his travels, he had gathered a remarkable collection of coins, stamps, and autographs. He had also visited museums and libraries, and had observed a high degree of duplication in collections. He developed a new system of cultural exchanges of items between libraries and museums, which he promoted energetically for decades. He used his fame as a ventriloquist to promote his proposed cultural exchange system.

After being rebuffed by the French legislature, he visited the United States in 1839 and 1847 to promote his system. His proposals were better-received in the United States and Canada than they had been in France. The city of Philadelphia gave him a signed copy of the Constitution, and he traveled to 13 states and Canada. By 1843, he had brought "1,800 volumes, 500 coins, 250 engravings, and numerous mineralogical and natural history specimens" to France. In his 1847 visit, Vattemare brought with him 50 cases of French archives and coins. In 1848, the U.S. Congress agreed to pay him $5,940 per year to support his project.

He inspired the founding of the Boston Public Library. He first proposed the unification of Boston's major social libraries and a committee to investigate this idea appointed by mayor, Josiah Quincy. In 1853, the system of exchange was expanded considerably with the participation of 130 libraries around the world, including the Boston Public Library. He created the American Library of Paris, which in 1860 contained 14,000 volumes from the early United States. Vattemare donated several cases of objects to the fledgling Smithsonian Institution, which set up a system of cultural exchange inspired by Vattemare's.

Although Vattemare's exchange system ran out of money and collapsed after Vattemare's death, the international book exchanges organized by Vattemare had accomplished the exchange of thousands of volumes. Vattemare is credited with inspiring the expansion of the library system in the United States, and his exchange system is regarded as a forerunner of later cultural exchange systems, including UNESCO. Books and other documents exchanged through Vattemare's system can still be found in libraries throughout the world, particularly Boston and Paris. Those collections include many rare and valuable publications of great interest to modern historians.

== Bibliography ==
This article draws heavily on the corresponding article in the French-language Wikipedia, accessed in the version of 10 July 2007.

- Havens, Earle. (2007). The ventriloquist who changed the world. American Libraries, 38(7), 54-57.
- Tilliette, Pierre-Alain, Havens, Earle, L'ambassadeur extravagant : Alexandre Vattemare, pionnier des échanges culturels internationaux, Le Passage, Paris, 2007
- Revai, Elisabeth, Alexandre Vattemare, trait d'union entre deux mondes : Le Québec et les États-Unis à l'aube de leurs relations culturelles avec la France au XIXe siècle : d'après des documents en grande partie inédits, certains provenant des familles Vattemare et Faribault, Bellarmin, Montréal, 1975
- Catalogue du fonds des États-Unis d'Amérique . 2. Précédé d'une étude sur Alexandre Vattemare et la bibliothèque américaine de la Ville de Paris par Pierre-Alain Tilliette, Mairie de Paris, Paris, 2002
