= John Y. Cole =

Librarian and historian at the Library of Congress

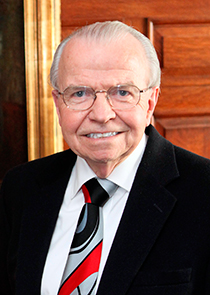
- Born: July 30, 1940 (age 85); Ellensburg, Washington, United States
- Education: University of Washington; Johns Hopkins University; George Washington University
- Occupations: Director of the Center for the Book at the Library of Congress, 1977-2016. Historian of the Library of Congress (2016-2021)

John Y. Cole (born July 30, 1940) is an American librarian, historian, and an author. He was the founding director of the Center for the Book at the Library of Congress and in 2016 became the first official historian of the Library of Congress.

== Education and career ==
John Young Cole was born in Ellensburg, Washington, July 30, 1940. He graduated from the University of Washington in Seattle in 1962, going on to earn a Master of Library Science degree from the University of Washington School of Librarianship the following year. He later earned a Master of Arts in Liberal Studies from Johns Hopkins University in 1966 and a Ph.D. from George Washington University in American civilization in 1971.

From 1962 to 1966, Cole was chief of the library branch of the U.S. Army Intelligence School, stocking the library's collection on foreign intelligence from books in the Library of Congress surplus books program.

Cole was hired at the Library of Congress in 1966 as an administrative assistant. He also worked in the Library's Congressional Research Service and in the Reference Department as a collection development librarian. He researched and wrote articles on the history of the library, focusing his Ph. D. dissertation on Ainsworth Rand Spofford, the nineteenth century Librarian of Congress who expanded the library from a small reference collection to a national institution.

Cole's knowledge about the history of the organization led to his role on a yearlong planning task force initiated by Librarian of Congress, Daniel Boorstin. Boorstin recommended Cole to lead the new Center for the Book, created in 1977 to use the resources of the Library of Congress to promote literacy and reading.

Cole served as the executive director for the Center of the Book from 1977 to 2016.

In 2000 he spoke at the Elizabeth W. Stone Lecture series on the "Bicentennial of the Library of Congress."

He worked with Laura Bush and James H. Billington to launch the National Book Festival in 2001.

Cole opened the Young Readers Center to encourage reading by young people, and created the Library of Congress Literacy Awards, providing recognition and financial prizes for organizations that promote increased literacy.

In 2007 Cole was the inaugural speaker for the American Library Association Library History Round Table Edward G. Holley Lecture. His co-lecturer was Jane Aiken of the National Endowment for the Humanities. The topic was “History as Collaboration.”

The role that John Cole played in promoting the study of the history of the book is documented in the essay, “The Center for the Book and the History of the Book.”

In 2016, Cole was named the first Historian of the Library of Congress. The position is dedicated to research and documentation of the history of the Library of Congress.

Cole has received many awards, notably the first "Champion for Literacy" award, presented by the Barbara Bush Foundation for Family Literacy in 2016, and the 2000 Joseph W. Lippincott Award, presented by the American Library Association for distinguished service to librarianship. The Lippincott Award statement praised Cole for having "exposed the American people to the power of the written word through dozens of national reading and library promotion projects including the landmark Read More About It series on CBS Television."

Since 2003 Cole and his wife, Director of the Smithsonian Libraries Nancy E. Gwinn, have maintained endowments to support the internships of library and information science students at the Smithsonian Libraries and at the University of Michigan School of Information. They also fund an endowment for supporting the operations of the technical services of the University of Wyoming Libraries.

== Selected bibliography ==
- Cole, John Young; Congress, Library of (1979). For Congress and the Nation : a chronological history of the Library of Congress through 1975. ISBN 978-0844402253. OCLC 2633473.
- Libraries and Scholarly Communication in the United States: The Historical Dimension, ed. Phyllis Dain and John Y. Cole (New York:Greenwood Press, 1990).
- Cole, John Young (1993). Jefferson's legacy : a brief history of the Library of Congress. Library of Congress. ISBN 9780844407647. OCLC 26502795.
- Cole, John Young; Congress, Library of (1995). On these walls : inscriptions and quotations in the buildings of the Library of Congress. The Library. ISBN 978-0844408453. OCLC 31295109.
- Cole, John Young; Cole, John Y.; Reed, Henry Hope; Small, Herbert (1997). The Library of Congress : the art and architecture of the Thomas Jefferson Building. W. W. Norton & Company. ISBN 978-0393045635. OCLC 37694014.
- Cole, John Young; Aikin, Jane (2004). Encyclopedia of the Library of Congress : for Congress, the nation & the world. Library of Congress. ISBN 978-0890599716. OCLC 57558633.
- Cole, John Y. (2017). America's greatest library : an illustrated history of the Library of Congress. ISBN 9781911282136. OCLC 974677704.
