= JRY =

JRY may refer to:

== People ==
- Jean R. Yawkey (1909–1992), owner of the Boston Red Sox baseball team
- John Russell Young Blakely (1872–1942), US Navy admiral
- John Ryan (songwriter) (born 1987), American producer and songwriter

== Other uses ==
- Jawahar Rozgar Yojana, an Indian rural employment program
- JRY Trust, a legal entity that owned the Boston Red Sox from 1992 to 2001
- USS J.R.Y. Blakely, American warship (1943–1946)

== See also ==
- Keokuk Junction Railway (reporting mark KJRY), a railroad in the U.S. states of Illinois and Iowa
