= George Blakely =

United States Army general

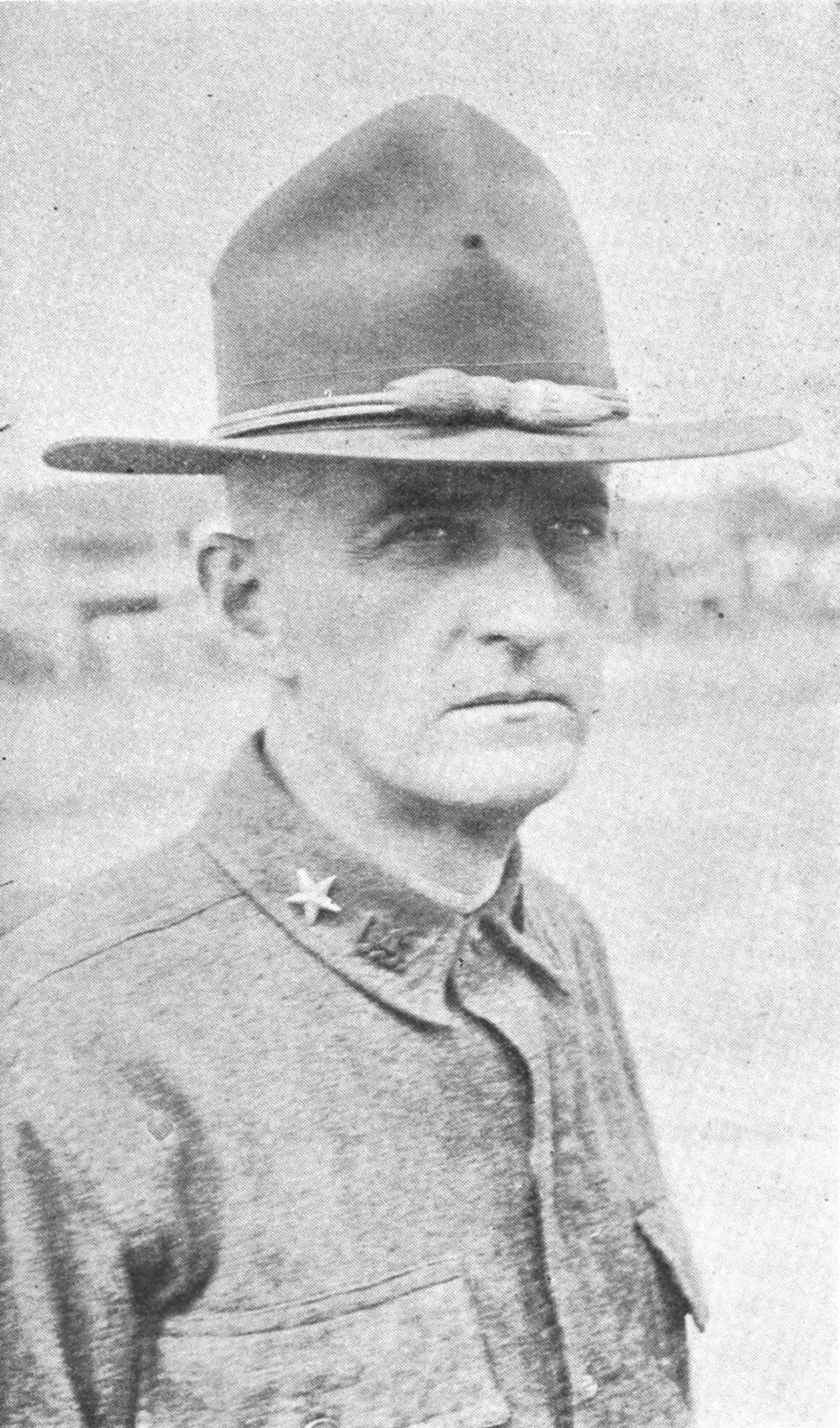
- Born: July 5, 1870; Philadelphia, Pennsylvania
- Died: November 16, 1965 (aged 95); San Francisco, California
- Military career
- Branch: United States Army
- Service years: 1892–1924
- Rank: Brigadier General
- Conflicts: World War I

George Blakely (July 5, 1870 – November 16, 1965) was an army officer and an American Brigadier general active during World War I.

== Early life and family ==
Blakely was born on July 5, 1870, in Philadelphia, Pennsylvania and attended Central High School there. In 1892, he graduated number four of sixty-two from the United States Military Academy. His younger brother, Charles School Blakely, was also a graduate of the United States Military Academy and later a general. Another brother, John Russell Young Blakely, was a graduate of the United States Naval Academy and later an admiral. Their parents were John Blakely, a journalist, and Mary Anne (Young) Blakely. Their uncles were John Russell Young and James Rankin Young.

== Career ==
Upon graduation, Blakely was commissioned in the Second Artillery Brigade and graduated from the Artillery School in 1896. From 1898 to 1901, and again from 1903 to 1908, he was an assistant professor of mathematics at the United States Military Academy. He served in the Coast Artillery but was later detailed to the Inspector General's Department. On August 2, 1917, Blakely was promoted to brigadier general, commanding the 61st Field Artillery Brigade at Fort Worth, Texas. From September 18, 1917, until December 5 of the same year, he temporarily commanded the 36th Division. From July to October 1918, he commanded the South Atlantic Coast Artillery District. From October 1918 to February 1919, Blakely was sent to France as commanding general of the 38th Artillery Brigade. After the war, he commanded the North Pacific Coast Artillery District.

Blakely retired on May 6, 1924, as a colonel. His rank of brigadier general was restored by act of Congress in June 1930.

== Later life ==
After retirement, Blakely lived in San Francisco, California. He died at the age of ninety-five on November 16, 1965, at Letterman General Hospital in San Francisco. Blakely was interred at Golden Gate National Cemetery three days later.

== Bibliography ==
- Davis, Henry Blaine Jr. Generals in Khaki. Raleigh, NC: Pentland Press, 1998. ISBN 1571970886 OCLC 231779136
- Marquis Who's Who, Inc. Who Was Who in American History, the Military. Chicago: Marquis Who's Who, 1975. ISBN 0837932017 OCLC 657162692
