= Charles Blakely =

Charles Blakely may refer to:

- Charles Adams Blakely (1879–1950), United States Navy officer
- Charles School Blakely (1880–1975), American army general
