= John Russell Young Blakely =

United States Navy admiral

- Born: July 17, 1872; Philadelphia, Pennsylvania, U.S.
- Died: March 28, 1942 (aged 69); Aurora, Colorado, U.S.
- Relatives: George Blakely & Charles School Blakely (brothers); John Russell Young & James Rankin Young (uncles)
- Military career
- Allegiance: United States of America
- Branch: United States Navy
- Service years: 1892–1932
- Rank: Rear admiral
- Commands: USS Des Moines; USS Seattle; USS Arizona
- Conflicts: World War I
- Awards: Navy Cross; Navy Distinguished Service Medal

John Russell Young Blakely (July 17, 1872 – March 28, 1942) was a rear admiral of the United States Navy.

== Biography ==
Blakely was born on July 17, 1872 in Philadelphia, Pennsylvania, where he attended Central High School. He graduated from the United States Naval Academy in 1892.

After serving in various Navy ships and at many shore stations, he took his first command, the protected cruiser USS Des Moines (C-15), in 1914. As captain of this ship, and later the armored cruiser USS Seattle (ACR-11), Blakely rendered important service in transporting and escorting troops and supplies to Europe during the First World War. For his outstanding contribution he was awarded the Navy Cross.

Following the war, Blakely served with the Chief of Naval Operations, at the Naval War College, and with the rank of captain he commanded the battleship USS Arizona (BB-39). After a tour as Assistant to the Chief of the Bureau of Navigation in 1925, he was promoted to rear admiral on 4 June 1926 and given command of a cruiser division temporarily assigned to the Asiatic Fleet after the 1927 unrest in Nanjing, China. Blakely served as the commander of Light Cruiser Division 3 (Richmond, Cincinnati and Marblehead) from February 1927 to April 1928 and Light Cruiser Division 2 (Trenton, Milwaukee, and Memphis) from April 1928 to June 1929. He also commanded the 15th Naval District and served on the important General Board before poor health forced him to retire 1 June 1932.

He was also a recipient of the Navy Distinguished Service Medal.

Blakely died on 28 March 1942 in Aurora, Colorado; he jumped from the fifth floor of Fitzsimons General Hospital. He was interred at Arlington National Cemetery on 1 April 1942.

== Family ==
United States Military Academy graduates George Blakely and Charles School Blakely were his brothers. Their parents were John Blakely, a journalist, and Mary Anne (Young) Blakely. Their uncles were John Russell Young and James Rankin Young.

== Namesake ==
USS J.R.Y. Blakely (DE-140), a destroyer escort, was named in his honor. The ship was launched by Consolidated Steel Corp., Ltd., Orange, Texas, 7 March 1943; sponsored by Miss Mary Young Blakely, niece of Rear Admiral Blakely; and commissioned 16 August 1943, Comdr. J. H. Forshew in command.
