= John Russell Young =

American journalist and librarian (1840–1899)

John Young
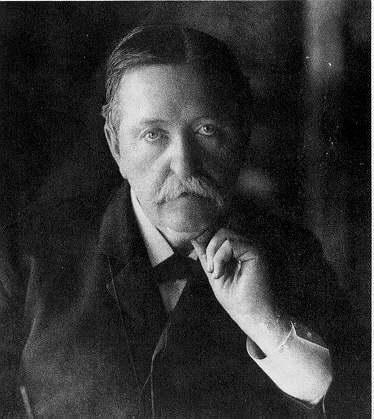
- Young, c. 1895

Librarian of Congress
- In office July 1, 1897 – January 17, 1899
- Appointed by: William McKinley
- Preceded by: Ainsworth Rand Spofford
- Succeeded by: Ainsworth Rand Spofford (acting)

United States Minister to the Qing Empire
- In office August 17, 1882 – April 7, 1885
- Appointed by: Rutherford B. Hayes
- Preceded by: James Burrill Angell
- Succeeded by: Charles Harvey Denby

Personal details
- Born: John Russell Young; November 20, 1840 County Tyrone, Ireland, UK (now Northern Ireland)
- Died: January 17, 1899 (aged 58) Washington, D.C., U.S.
- Relatives: James Young (brother)

John Russell Young (November 20, 1840 – January 17, 1899) was an American journalist, author, diplomat, and the seventh Librarian of the United States Congress from 1897 to 1899. He was invited by Ulysses S. Grant to accompany him on a world tour for purposes of recording the two-year journey, which he published in a two-volume work.

== Biography ==
Young was born in County Tyrone, Ireland, but as a young child his family emigrated to Philadelphia. He entered the newspaper business full time as a proofreader at age 15. As a reporter for the Philadelphia Press, he distinguished himself with his coverage of the First Battle of Bull Run. By 1862 he was managing editor of the Press and another newspaper. Young was also the youngest founding member of the Union League of Philadelphia.

In 1865, he moved to New York, where he became a close friend of Henry George and helped to distribute Progress and Poverty. He began writing for Horace Greeley's New York Tribune and became managing editor of that paper. He also began working for the government, undertaking missions to Europe for the US Department of State and the US Department of the Treasury. In 1872, he joined the New York Herald and reported for them from Europe.

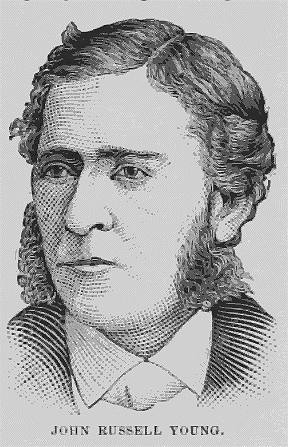
John Russell Young Illustrated Portrait 1888

Young was invited to accompany President Ulysses S. Grant on Grant's famous 1877-1879 world tour, chronicled in Young's book Around the World with General Grant. Young impressed Grant, especially in China where Young struck up a friendship with Li Hongzhang. Grant persuaded President Chester A. Arthur to appoint Young minister to China in 1882. In this position he distinguished himself by mediating and settling disputes between the US and China and France and China. Unlike many other diplomats, he opposed the policy of removing Korea from Chinese suzerainty.

In 1885, Young resumed working for the Herald in Europe. In 1890, he returned to Philadelphia. In 1892, Young became a director of the Union League of Philadelphia. He was elected president of the League in 1893 and 1894. Young organized a thirtieth-year reunion in April 1893 of senior officers from both sides of the Battle of Gettysburg. Among those who participated were Confederate generals E. P. Alexander and James Longstreet, Union generals D. McMurtrie Gregg and Daniel Sickles and Pennsylvania governor Robert E. Pattison.

In 1897, President William McKinley appointed him Librarian of Congress, the first librarian confirmed by Congress. During his tenure, the library began moving from its original home in the US Capitol Building to its own structure, an accomplishment largely the responsibility of his predecessor, Ainsworth Rand Spofford. Spofford served as Chief Assistant Librarian under Young. Young held the post of librarian until his death.

Young was not content with just being an administrator who allowed Spofford to concentrate on the library relocation effort. He introduced a popular reading area for blind library patrons. Young also sought to increase the library's international holdings through his diplomatic connections. After consulting with Secretary of State William R. Day, he sent a letter to U.S. embassies and consulates around the world in February 1898 requesting documents and manuscripts.

He died in Washington, D.C. on January 17, 1899, and is interred at Mount Moriah Cemetery in Philadelphia, Pennsylvania.

== Family ==
Young was the son of George Young and his wife Elizabeth "Eliza" (Rankin) Young. His family was not Irish Catholic, but rather Scottish Presbyterian. They emigrated from Ireland to the United States with young John in 1841 and settled in Downingtown, Pennsylvania, where his sister Mary Anne was born in 1843. The following year, they moved to Philadelphia where his brother, future Congressman James Rankin Young, was born a few years later. Another sister, Elizabeth, was born in 1850.

Young began his education in Philadelphia, attending the Harrison Grammar School. After his mother Eliza died in 1851, he was sent to live with his father's older brother James R. Young who had emigrated from Ireland to New Orleans in 1837. There Young attended the high school until he returned to Philadelphia at the age of fifteen. When not in class, he found his first employment as a part-time printer's boy at the Creole newspaper.

On October 18, 1864, Young married Rose Fitzpatrick in Washington, D.C. They had three children, all of whom died in childhood. Frequently ill, his wife died in New York City on January 4, 1881. On April 25, 1882, Young remarried with Julia Coleman, a niece of former Connecticut governor Marshall Jewell, in Hartford, Connecticut. She accompanied him to China, but left in April 1883 to await the birth of their first child in Paris. Their son, Russell Jewell Young, was born on August 1, 1883, but then his wife died in October. The infant was sent to Hartford to be cared for by her family until after Young returned home from China. Russell Young later attended Yale College and became a journalist like his father, working for the Hartford Daily Courant. He died on October 29, 1916, at the age of thirty-three.

On November 18, 1890, Young married Mrs. May (Dow) Davids, a widow with children from her first marriage, at the Astor House in New York City. Their son, born on December 14, 1891, was Brig. Gen. Gordon Russell Young, a 1913 United States Military Academy graduate who was Engineer Commissioner of the District of Columbia from 1945 to 1951 and a recipient of the Distinguished Service Medal and the Legion of Merit. After her husband's death in 1899, May Young served as editor in the publication of his memoirs Men and Memories: Personal Reminiscences in 1901. She died on July 6, 1924.

May Young had two sons and five older stepchildren from her first marriage to George W. Davids, whose father was Thaddeus Davids. John Russell Young adopted the two younger boys, who lived with them in Philadelphia and then Washington. Howard Gilman Young joined Teddy Roosevelt's Rough Riders in May 1898, serving as a private in Company I. After the Spanish–American War, he was commissioned as a second lieutenant in the regular army, serving with the 6th Infantry in the Philippines. Berkeley Reynolds Young worked at the Library of Congress and pursued a law degree at George Washington University. A few years after their stepfather's death, both young men had their surname legally changed back to Davids. After serving as an officer in the Coast Artillery Corps during World War I, Berkeley Davids returned to his law career while his older brother Howard Davids remained in the army until September 1934, retiring as a colonel.

On October 18, 1865, Young's sister Mary Anne married John Blakely, a fellow Philadelphia journalist. They had five sons and a daughter. Three of their sons, George Blakely, John Russell Young Blakely, and Charles School Blakely, became flag officers in the U.S. military. Young himself was negatively affected by the death of his sister in February 1898.

== See also ==
- Bibliography of Ulysses S. Grant
- World tour of Ulysses S. Grant

== Works (partial list) ==
- "New Life in China" The North American Review, vol. 153 (1891) pp. 420–431.
- "The Chinese Question Again" The North American Review, vol. 154 (1892) pp. 596–602.
