= Charles School Blakely =

United States Army general (1880–1975)

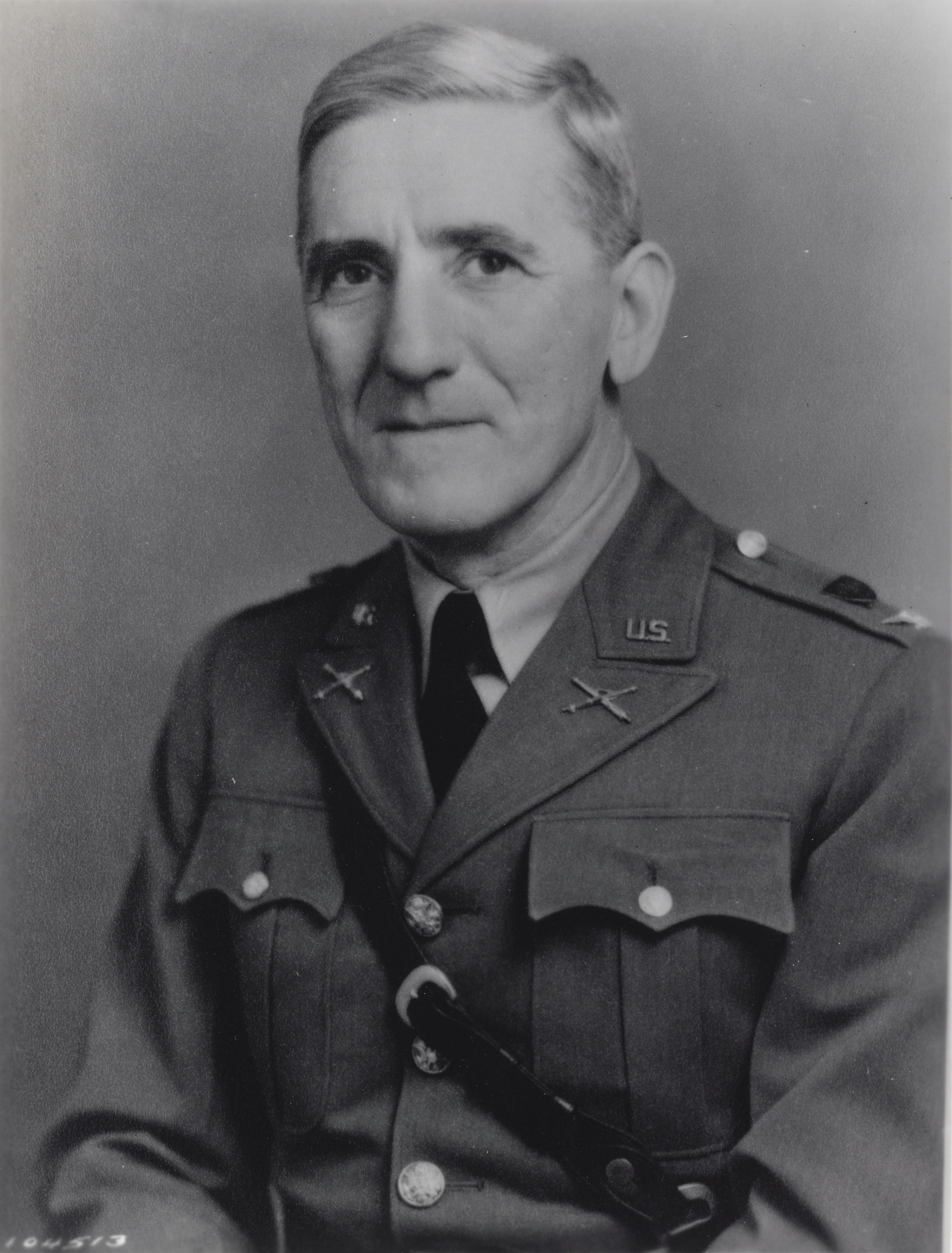
- Blakely as a colonel in 1937
- Born: November 6, 1880; Philadelphia, Pennsylvania, U.S.
- Died: January 11, 1975 (aged 94) Louisville, Kentucky, U.S.
- Service years: 1904–1938
- Rank: Brigadier General
- Conflicts: World War I

Charles School Blakely (November 6, 1880 – January 11, 1975) was an American army officer and brigadier general who served during World War I.

== Early life and family ==
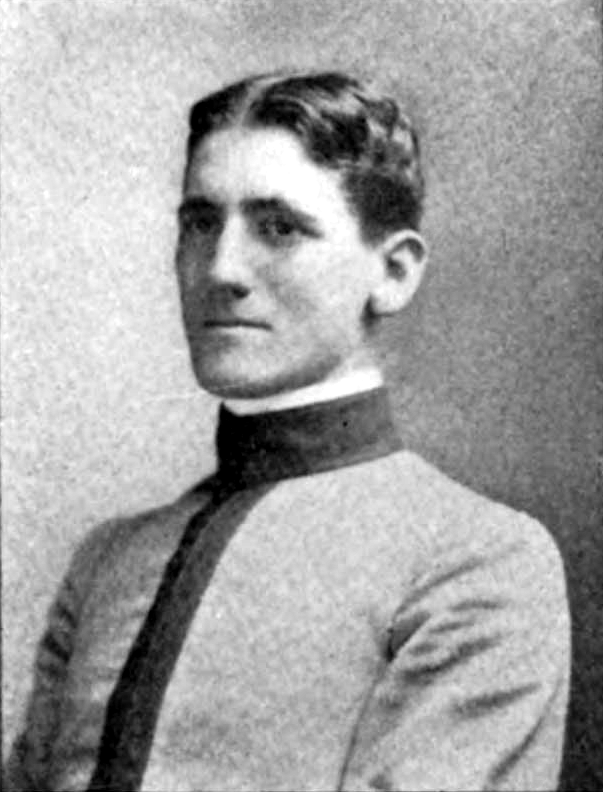
At West Point in 1904

Blakely was born in Philadelphia on November 6, 1880. He attended the University of Pennsylvania for two years before entering the United States Military Academy in June 1900. In 1904, he graduated 29th of 124 from the Military Academy. Blakely's older brother, George Blakely, was also a graduate of the United States Military Academy and a U.S. general. Another brother, John Russell Young Blakely, was a graduate of the United States Naval Academy and later an admiral. Their parents were John Blakely, a journalist, and Mary Anne (Young) Blakely. Their uncles were John Russell Young and James Rankin Young.

== Career ==
Blakely was an artilleryman and was promoted to brigadier general on October 1, 1918, commanding an artillery brigade in France. He later served as the commanding general of the brigade fire center. Blakely graduated from the School of the Line at Fort Leavenworth, Kansas, in 1921 and from the General Staff School in 1922.

From 1922 to 1925, he served as executive officer for the Chief of Field Artillery in Washington. He graduated from the United States Army War College in 1926. During 1926 and 1927, Blakely studied at the Naval War College in Newport, Rhode Island. From 1934 to 1937, Blakely was assistant commandant of the Field Artillery School at Fort Sill, Oklahoma. In 1938, after thirty-four years of service, Blakely retired due to disabilities.

== Later life ==
Blakely died at his home in Louisville, Kentucky, at the age of ninety-four on January 11, 1975. He was interred at Zachary Taylor National Cemetery three days later.
