= USS J.R.Y. Blakely =

1943 Edsall-class destroyer escort

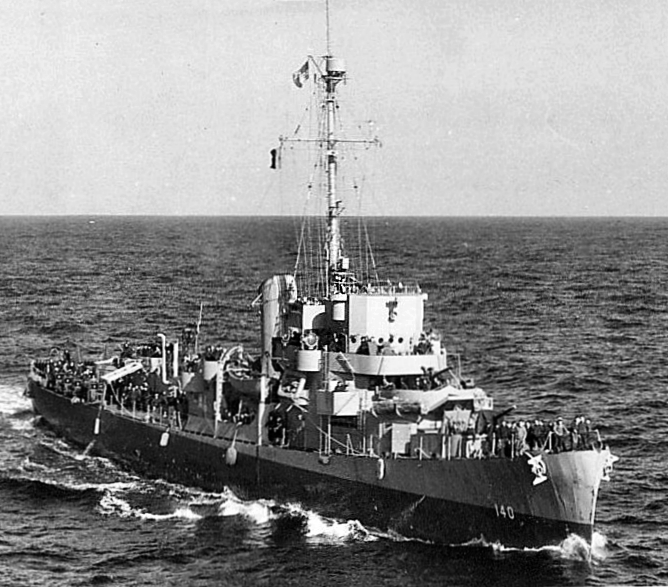

History

United States
- Namesake: John Russell Young Blakely
- Builder: Consolidated Steel Corporation, Orange, Texas
- Laid down: 16 December 1942
- Launched: 7 March 1943
- Commissioned: 16 August 1943
- Decommissioned: 14 June 1946
- Stricken: 2 January 1971
- Fate: Sold for scrapping 22 August 1973

General characteristics
- Class & type: Edsall-class destroyer escort
- Displacement: 1,253 tons standard; 1,590 tons full load
- Length: 306 feet (93.27 m)
- Beam: 36.58 feet (11.15 m)
- Draft: 10.42 full load feet (3.18 m)
- Propulsion: 4 FM diesel engines, 4 diesel-generators, 6,000 shp (4.5 MW), 2 screws
- Speed: 21 knots (39 km/h)
- Range: 9,100 nmi. at 12 knots; (17,000 km at 22 km/h)
- Complement: 8 officers, 201 enlisted
- Armament: 3 × single 3 in (76 mm)/50 guns; 1 × twin 40 mm AA guns; 8 × single 20 mm AA guns; 1 × triple 21 in (533 mm) torpedo tubes; 8 × depth charge projectors; 1 × depth charge projector (hedgehog); 2 × depth charge tracks

USS J.R.Y. Blakely (DE-140) was an Edsall-class destroyer escort in service with the United States Navy from 1943 to 1946. She was scrapped in 1973.

== History ==
USS J.R.Y. Blakely was named in honor of Rear Admiral John Russell Young Blakely who was born 17 July 1872 in Philadelphia, Pennsylvania, and graduated from the U.S. Naval Academy in 1892. She was launched by Consolidated Steel Corp., Ltd., Orange, Texas, 7 March 1943; sponsored by Miss Mary Young Blakely, niece of Rear Admiral Blakely; and commissioned 16 August 1943.

=== Battle of the Atlantic ===
J.R.Y. Blakely conducted her shakedown training out of Bermuda during September 1943, returning to Charleston, South Carolina, 22 September to prepare for convoy duty in the Atlantic. She sailed 4 October from Norfolk, Virginia, with a convoy for the Mediterranean; and, after transporting precious supplies safely to Casablanca, returned to New York 16 November. J. R. Y. Blakely made another round trip voyage to Casablanca December 1943 through January 1944, and a third during February through March 1944, as American ships began the great buildup in Europe.

After voyage repairs the escort vessel was assigned to a hunter-killer group built around an escort carrier. She sailed from New York 30 March 1944 and rendezvoused with USS Core and her escorts in the Atlantic to search for German submarines. After a vigilant search and stops at Newfoundland and Casablanca the ship reached New York 30 May 1944. J. R. Y. Blakely was soon at sea again, joining USS Wake Island group at Norfolk 15 June. During June and July the ships intensified the hunt for U-boats, and covered the all-important supply convoys in the Atlantic. After a short stay in Casablanca harbor, the group was sent by Admiral Royal E. Ingersoll to search for German weather picket submarines, and by 2 August the escorts had found the German submarine U-804. In the engagement which followed, USS Fiske was torpedoed and sunk. J, R. Y. Blakely made several depth charge attacks before retiring to protect Wake Island. She returned to New York 16 August 1944.

The ship conducted training operations in Casco Bay, Maine, for several weeks, but departed Norfolk 8 September with another hunter-killer group, led by USS Mission Bay. On this cruise the escort vessel took part in her first successful attack, as the Mission Bay group was sent to break up a suspected meeting between cargo submarine German submarine U-1062 and another submarine. The USS Tripoli group helped maintain an around the clock search, and on 30 September USS Fessenden, USS Howard and J. R. Y. Blakely began to search out a contact. Fessenden's depth charge attack sank the submarine, U-1062, which was carrying valuable cargo for Germany. Following this success the group moved into the South Atlantic, where because of the great success of allied antisubmarine tactics, contacts were scarce. After visiting Bahia, Brazil, and Cape Town, South Africa, J. R. Y. Blakely arrived New York 27 November 1944.

During December the ship conducted additional training in the Caribbean, after which she sailed 16 January 1945 to participate in tactics out of Mayport, Florida. After screening carriers and acting as rescue ship, the ship carried out training and escort duties in the Caribbean, arriving New York 9 March 1945.

As German submarines were known to be moving westward for a final effort against the United States, J. R. Y. Blakely again joined an escort carrier group, and with Mission Bay and destroyer escorts set up barrier patrol north of the Azores as part of Operation Teardrop. The ships departed 27 March, and in the cruise which followed sank one of the U-boats, combining with other hunter-killer groups to foil the German plans. J. R. Y. Blakely returned to New York 14 May, her important work in the Atlantic completed.

=== Pacific War ===
Following carrier training operations, the ship sailed for the Panama Canal, arriving 19 July 1945, and joined the Pacific Fleet. She reached San Diego, California, 29 July for onward routing to Pearl Harbor, where the ship celebrated the end of organized hostilities 15 August 1945. J. R. Y. Blakely departed 27 August, however, to perform escort duties among the island bases of the western Pacific. The ship also aided in the occupation of many small islands before arriving San Diego, California, 23 January 1946.

=== Decommissioning and fate ===
J.R.Y. Blakely steamed via the Panama Canal to New York 15 February, and after pre-inactivation overhaul arrived Green Cove Springs, Florida, 13 March 1946. She decommissioned 14 June 1946 and was placed in reserve, later moving to the Texas Group. She was struck from the Navy list on 2 January 1971, and sold for scrapping 22 August 1973.
