= James R. Young (Pennsylvania politician) =

American politician

James Rankin Young
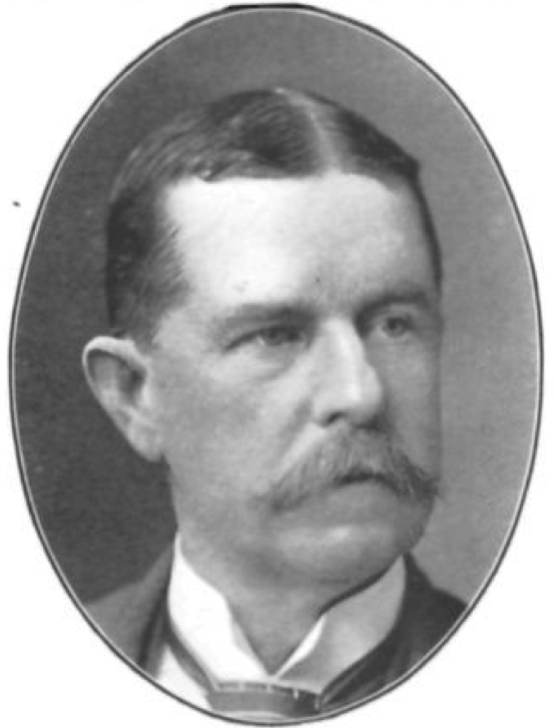

Member of the U.S. House of Representatives from Pennsylvania's 4th district
- In office March 4, 1897 – March 3, 1903
- Preceded by: John E. Reyburn
- Succeeded by: Robert H. Foerderer

Personal details
- Born: March 10, 1847 Philadelphia, Pennsylvania, U.S.
- Died: December 18, 1924 (aged 77) Washington, D.C., U.S.
- Party: Republican
- Relatives: John Russell Young (brother); John Russell Young (son)

James Rankin Young (March 10, 1847 – December 18, 1924) was an American newspaperman and Civil War veteran who served three terms as a Republican member of the U.S. House of Representatives from Pennsylvania from 1897 to 1903.

He was the younger brother of fellow journalist John Russell Young.

== Early life ==
James R. Young was born in Philadelphia, Pennsylvania and attended Central High School until 1863.

=== Civil War ===
He enlisted in the Union Army in June 1863 in the Thirty-second Regiment, Pennsylvania Volunteer Infantry and served until 1865.

=== Newspaper business ===
He was one of the founders of the Philadelphia Evening Star in 1866. He attended all of the Republican National Conventions from 1864 through 1908. He served as chief of the Washington bureau of the New York Tribune from June 1866 to December 1870.

=== Federal employee ===
He was chief executive clerk of the United States Senate from December 1873 to March 1879 and again from December 1883 to April 1892. In between he was Chief Clerk of the Department of Justice from September 1882 to December 1883.

== United States House of Representatives ==
He was elected in 1896 as a Republican to the 55th United States Congress. He was the Chairman of the United States House Committee on Expenditures in the War Department in the 57th United States Congress. He became superintendent of the Dead Letter Office of the Post Office Department from 1905 to 1913, and superintendent of the postal savings depository in Philadelphia until 1915.

== Death and burial ==
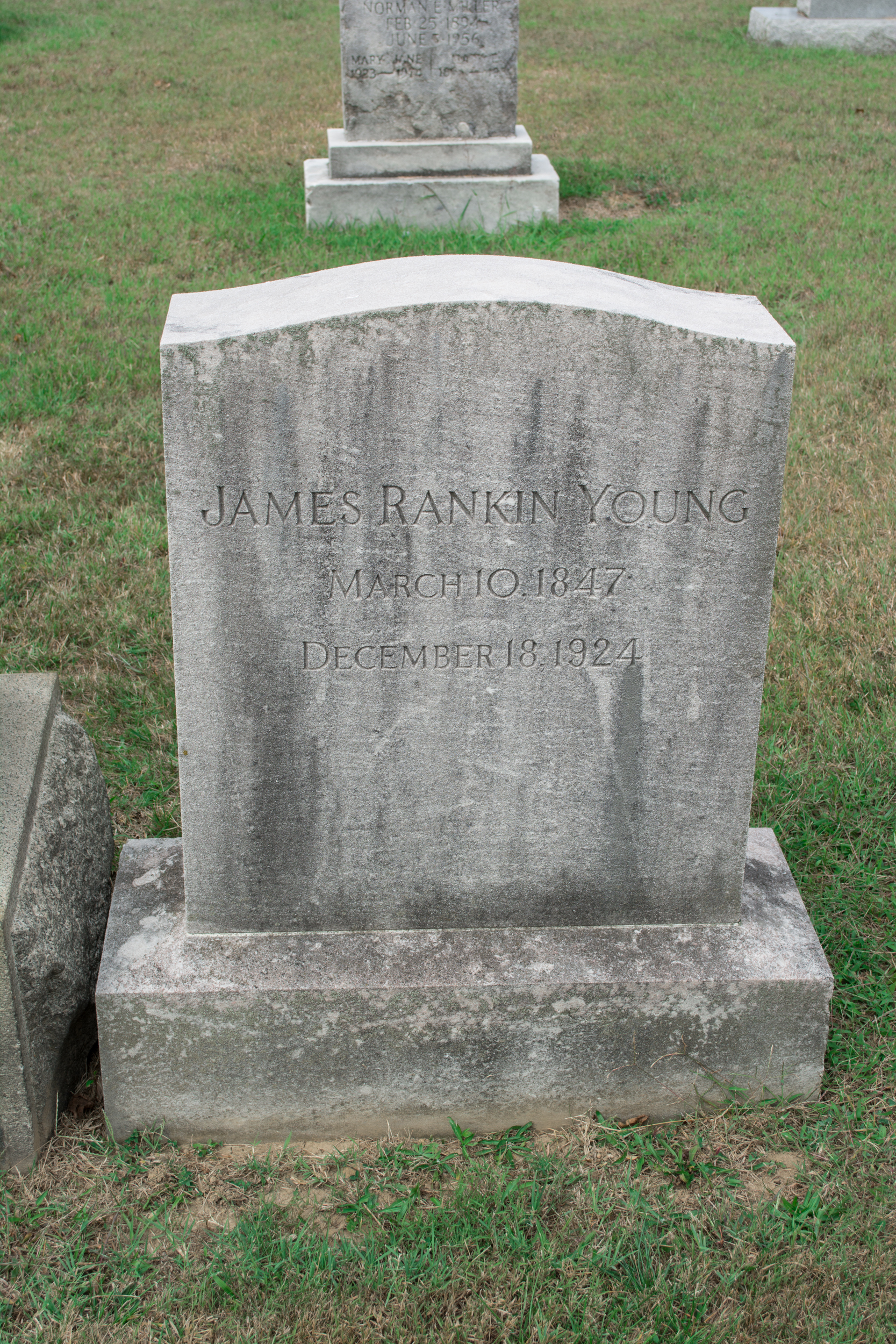
Grave of James Rankin Young at Glenwood Cemetery.

He was a resident of Washington, D.C., until his death. He was interred at Glenwood Cemetery in Washington, D.C.

U.S. House of Representatives
Preceded by John E. Reyburn	Member of the U.S. House of Representatives from Pennsylvania's 4th congressional district 1897–1903	Succeeded by Robert H. Foerderer
