= David C. Mearns =

American librarian and Lincoln scholar

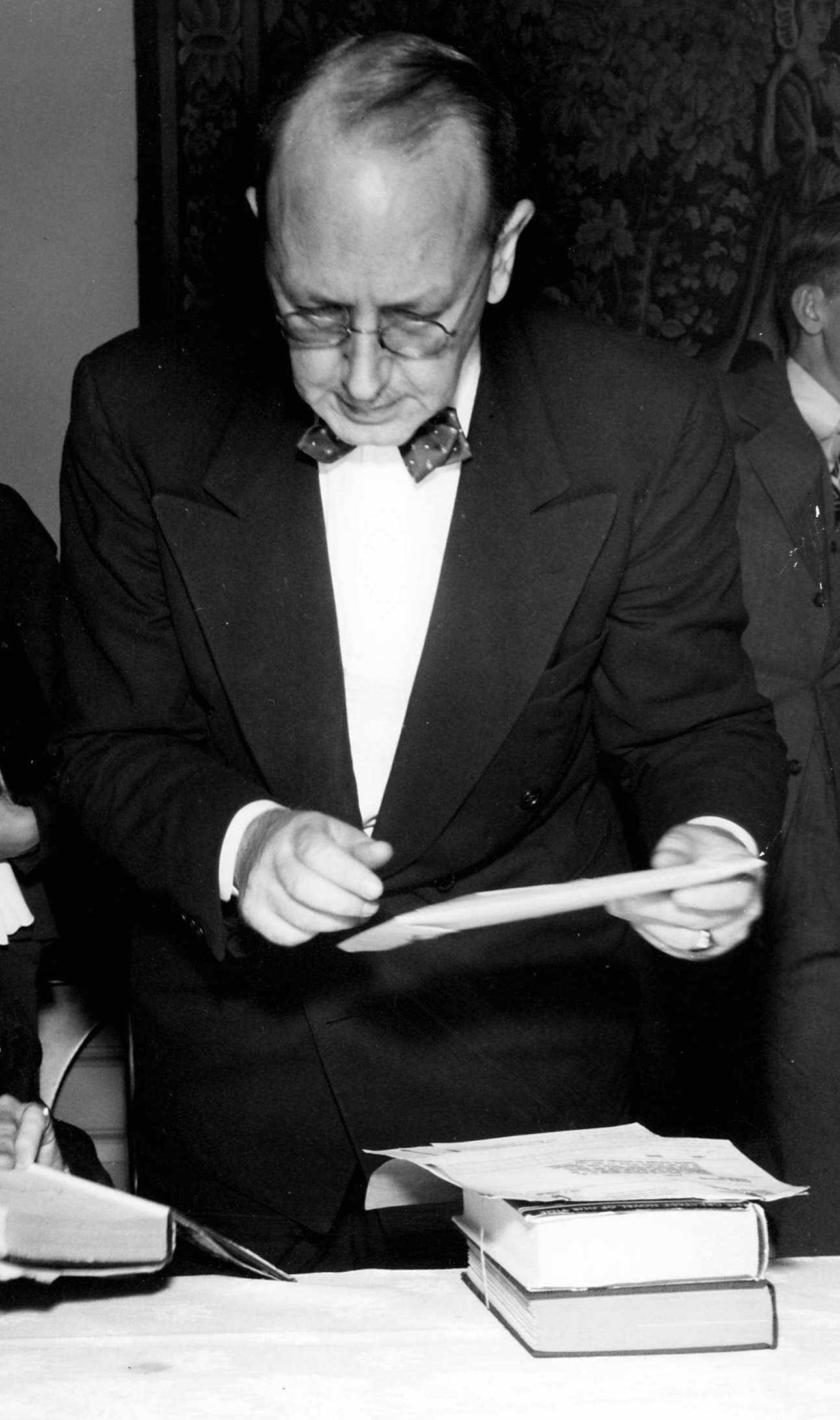
- Born: December 31, 1899; Washington, DC, United States
- Died: May 21, 1981 (aged 81); Alexandria, Virginia, United States
- Occupation: Librarian

David Chambers Mearns (December 31, 1899 – May 21, 1981) was an American librarian and scholar of Abraham Lincoln. He held multiple positions at the Library of Congress over 58 years of service, including director of the reference department, chief of the manuscript division, and Chair of American History. Mearns wrote the first authoritative book on the Library's collection of Lincoln's papers, along with twelve other books. Librarian of Congress Archibald MacLeish described Mearns as "the rarest treasure in the Library of Congress".

== Early life and education ==
David Chambers Mearns was born December 31, 1899, in Washington, D.C.

He was a student at St. Albans School beginning in 1914, graduating in 1916. Mearns attended George Washington University from 1916 to 1917 and the University of Virginia in 1918, but graduated from neither school. His only degree was the honorary Doctor of Letters degree he received from Lincoln College in 1960.

== Career at Library of Congress ==
Mearns was hired at the Library of Congress in 1918, in a position sorting books in the library's cellar for a salary of $360 a year. From 1920 to 1943, he served in a number of increasingly responsible roles within the Library's Reading Room, including chief assistant of the Reading Rooms Division and Superintendent of Reading Rooms.

In 1943, Mearns became the director of the Reference Department, the largest department in the Library. In this position and following administration positions, he gradually took on the role of the principal interpreter of the Library's history and services. He wrote The story up to now: the Library of Congress, 1800-1946 in 1947, providing a historical perspective on the institution.

1949 saw Mearns appointed to the role of assistant librarian, joining Luther H. Evans and Verner Clapp in the primary administrative roles of running the Library. He became chief of the Manuscript Division in 1951, the role he would keep until his retirement in 1967. He continued writing about the history of the Library, including Herbert Putnam, 1861-1955 : a memorial tribute in 1956.

Under his direction, the Library began the National Union Catalog of Manuscript Collections program, providing cataloging for archival and manuscript collections in archives and historical societies across the United States. He was also instrumental in shepherding a program to process and microfilm the presidential papers collection. As assistant librarian for the American collections, he coordinated all acquisitions and services in the library relating to American history and civilization.

After his retirement, he served as the Library as an honorary consultant in the humanities until 1976.

Associate Librarian of Congress John C. Broderick wrote about his career:

David Mearns's contributions to the Library of Congress were perhaps more qualitative than quantitative. He steeped himself in the Library's history and its collections to know the answers to questions and to make them known to others. He published his own findings but more often encouraged publications by others. He fashioned the Presidential Papers Program and thus spread throughout the American research library system the Library's most treasured original research materials. More than anything else, he represented the Library of Congress to a world of historians, bookpeople, the working press, and the public at large.

=== Lincoln research ===
The papers of Abraham Lincoln were collected and organized by his son Robert Todd Lincoln, who deeded the collection to the Library of Congress in 1923. Mearns became interested in the Library's Lincoln collection while working in the reference room in the 1920s, and especially after seeing Robert Todd Lincoln at the Library. He began studying the collection as soon as they were available for study in 1947, and published the first authoritative report in 1948, with a foreword by Carl Sandburg. Mearns wrote, co-wrote, and contributed to several books about Lincoln throughout his career, including Largely Lincoln in 1961.

After the assassination of John F. Kennedy in 1963, First Lady Jackie Kennedy requested ceremonies similar to those rendered for Abraham Lincoln. Professor James I. Robertson Jr., director of the American Civil War Centennial Commission, contacted Mearns to research what those ceremonies had entailed. Using flashlights because the Library's timed lights would not operate after business hours, they retrieved issues of Frank Leslie's Illustrated Newspaper and Harper's Weekly, which gave elaborate details about Lincoln's funeral. This information was used to decorate the White House's East Room just as it had been a century before.

== Professional service and memberships ==
Mearns was a part of the National Historical Publications Commission (now the National Archives and Records Administration's National Historical Publications and Records Commission) for thirteen years, representing the Library of Congress. He served on multiple other commissions, including several Civil War centennial commissions and the Lincoln Sesquicentennial Commission. He was elected as a member of the American Antiquarian Society in 1966. Mearns was also a member of Phi Beta Kappa.

== Personal life and death ==
Mearns was married twice. He married Mildred Sellars Haines in 1929, and they had one daughter together, Anne. Mildred died in 1945. He married Mary Hume Richardson in 1951; they were married until Mearns's death.

He died in Alexandria, Virginia on May 21, 1981.
