= H. Donald Wilson =

American technology pioneer (1923–2006)

Henry Donald Wilson (November 21, 1923 – November 12, 2006), generally referred to as H. Donald Wilson was a database pioneer and entrepreneur. He was also the first president and one of the principal creators of the Lexis legal information system, and Nexis. An attorney by training who became an information industry innovator and a venture capital consultant to numerous businesses, Wilson was also an internationalist and a conservationist. At the time of his death, he was chairman of Lessac Technologies Inc., a text-to-voice software venture based on nearly fifty years of partnership with Arthur Lessac.

A speech about his life that Wilson gave on June 9, 2006, at Collington-Kendal was called "From Idealist to Idealistic Realist With a Ride on Moore's Law." He concluded the story of his life saying, "We are in a race between having new technology destroy us and using it to save ourselves."

== Personal life ==
=== Upbringing ===
Born in New Rochelle, New York, on November 21, 1923, he was the third son of Andrew Wilson and Edith Rose Wilson. He was raised in Edgemont and Scarsdale, New York. His father was the chairman of the County Trust Company bank. He was a descendant of Sarah Wells and William Bull, early settlers of Orange County NY and builders of the Bull Stone House in Hamptonburg. Don Wilson and his wife Mary Louise Swan Baron Wilson lived in White Plains, New York, for 49 years.

Wilson attended public high school in Scarsdale, New York, through ninth grade, and graduated from Phillips Academy in Andover, Massachusetts, in 1941. He was the Andover Scholar in Mathematics as a freshman at Yale University. When Pearl Harbor was bombed, he and his classmates were immediately placed in an accelerated academic program, completing their studies in three years. He took a B.A. degree with honors in international relations and was an editor of the Yale Daily News. At Yale, he was a member of Berzelius and DKE.

=== World War II ===
Wilson shipped out to the South Pacific in 1944 as a lieutenant junior grade on the USS Paul Hamilton. He received his Yale diploma by mail in 1945. He served in seven battle campaigns including Leyte Gulf, Mindoro, and Iwo Jima. At Okinawa, he served as assistant gunnery officer through the longest shore bombardment in U.S. history. He took command of a medium-size landing craft in San Diego and sailed it through the Panama Canal and home to Charleston, South Carolina. He was discharged in June 1946.

=== Law school ===
Returning from the war, Wilson commuted to Columbia Law School by motorcycle from his parents' home in Edgemont, New York. He headed the Moot Court Committee, which he reorganized, and graduated in 1948 in the top 25% of his class. He loved to dance and was a sought-after partner for debutante balls and with friends in Manhattan nightclubs. He remained concerned, however, about the possibility of a new world war. He joined the law firm of Sullivan and Cromwell in New York City in November 1948, and resigned in March 1949 to become an organizer for the United World Federalists (UWF). He said he did this "because of the conviction that another war was shaping up, that the United Nations could not keep the peace, and that the only way to prevent it was to work for development of the UN into a stronger war-prevention body." (From his 1953 resume.)

Wilson reentered the legal profession in 1955, joining the law firm of Paul Weiss Rifkind Wharton & Garrison in Manhattan. The popular magazine Saturday Review was one of his accounts, and he found a mentor in its editor Norman Cousins. At Cousin's urging, Wilson and his friend William Josephson became the junior attorneys on a landmark case, Reynolds v. United States involving the skipper of a boat arrested for sailing into a Pacific nuclear test area. They also helped Cousins raise money to bring over the Hiroshima Maidens, Japanese women who needed reconstructive surgery as a result of nuclear radiation poisoning as well as the Ravensbruck Maidens, women who had been used as the subject of medical experimentation by the Nazis.

=== Marriage ===
Wilson met Mary Louise Swan Baron (known as Peter) in 1951 when she responded to a classified ad for a secretary in the Federalist office. Sue Hepburn, the sister of actress Katharine Hepburn, was on his Board of Directors. Reputedly, she saw "sparks fly" between the young veteran and the young woman and blocked the hiring. They met again in the Connecticut offices of Bice Clemow, the editor of the West Hartford News, for whom Peter Baron was working. Six months later they married in Wellesley. They had three children Edith R. Wilson, Bice C. Wilson, and Anne B. Wilson.

== Business ==
Don Wilson worked with computers all his adult life, starting in the Navy. Though not an engineer, he had a driving vision of what computers could be used for in society. From his engagement with LexisNexis on, he worked with databases and encyclopedias of all sorts. He consulted to several encyclopedia companies on their electronic futures, including Encyclopædia Britannica. He quickly grasped the potential of combining the exponential growth of computing power (Moore's Law) with the availability of information via the internet. He was, for all these reasons, fascinated with the power of the concept of Wikipedia, which he used as soon as it became available.

=== Management consultant ===
In 1960, Wilson left the law to become a management consultant at Arthur D. Little (ADL); eventually he became managing director of its New York office. During the next decade, his clients ranged from CBS Publishing, the creation of the children's toy company Creative Playthings, the introduction of the Sony Trinitron to the U.S. market, the commercial introduction of Velcro fabric, and many others. He carried out several studies of the maritime industry, including one on the introduction of containerization to the Port of New York. He recounted many times that he advised the Port of New York to introduce standardized shipping containers slowly since it would result in a major shift in labor. This advice was ignored. He was not surprised when the dockworkers union shut down the port for a series of lengthy and expensive strikes in the 1960s resulting in the agreement to pay "containerization royalties" to dockworkers for years to come.

=== Lexis Nexis information retrieval ===
Returning to Arthur D. Little in 1966 after two years as Peace Corps Director in Ethiopia, he continued to work with clients with technological innovations. In the late 1960s he was asked to develop a business plan for an Ohio software company called Data Corporation which in late 1968 had been acquired by the forest-product firm Mead Corporation. Founded by William Gorog and his partner, Lysle Cahill, Data Central had received Air Force Funding to develop a range of innovations in equipment, cameras, printers, and software. This included an Information Systems Division that had a promising on-line database software technology made possible by the power of the new IBM 360 computers. This kind of information retrieval was then in the very early stages in terms of what was technically possible. An interesting discussion of this period is found in the account of engineer Richard (Dick) Giering. The question was whether this information retrieval was a viable business, and if so, what direction it should take in terms of markets.

There was already an initial relationship with the Ohio Bar Association (OBAR), which was interested in new approaches to managing legal data. Wilson and his colleagues presented their research and the resulting business plan to James McSwiney, President, William Womack, Executive Vice President and other senior officers of the Mead Corporation on February 4, 1970, in Dayton, Ohio. A transcript of the meeting was made, and the original business plan still exists—entitled " A Major Opportunity for Mead to enter the field of information services through automated legal research—Business Venture Analysis." On the Arthur D. Little side were H. Donald Wilson, Edward Gottsman, Jerome Rubin, Richard Erb, Edward Smith III, Robin Woodward, Anthony Gunn, and James Hoyte. William Gorog represented Data Central. Based on this study, the venture moved forward and eventually the Mead Corporation hired Wilson away from Arthur D. Little, Inc. to be the first president. Jerome Rubin also left ADL at this time and became the second president of MDC after Wilson moved to the venture's board as Vice Chairman.

One of the significant factors in Lexis's success was Wilson's ability to bridge the worlds of business, law, and computers. His insider's knowledge of the sociology and particularly the hierarchy of law firms was fundamental to the business plan he and his team worked out. In this period, few lawyers knew anything about computers, and most senior attorneys disdained them. Jerome Rubin, then an attorney on the team, makes the interesting comment in the 1970 presentation about "knowing nothing about technology". Wilson, by contrast, was trained by the Navy to use early radar and had an attraction to and understanding of technological innovation. This knowledge helped shape Lexis into a viable business venture. It is clear from the 1970 presentation that Wilson understood how fundamentally this innovation would change the practice of the law, a vision that was proved out. The comments that appeared in various internet chat rooms in November 2006 when his obituary appeared attested to other people's recognition that Lexis and Nexis were transformative technological applications. Law librarians were particularly outspoken about how these innovations had changed research. It is estimated by Dr. David Evans of Carnegie Mellon that up to 1991, only 100,000 people used search engines regularly and a significant portion of those were LexisNexis users.

Wilson later advised many publishers about the early development of database businesses, and worked with many startups such as Polygon, Oxford Analytica, Toxicheck, and ConQuest Software (later Excaliber) where he was Vice-Chairman. A board member of the Information Industry Association, he received its leadership award in 1992, 1993, and 1996.

=== Lessac System for Voice ===
For 58 years, Wilson was the business partner of Arthur Lessac, an internationally known professor of voice based in Manhattan. Upset at being turned down by the Yale Glee Club, Wilson first sought out Lessac as a voice coach in the 1940s. Later, Wilson gave Lessac a desk, typewriter and secretary to write The Use and Training of the Human Voice, now in its third edition. He also helped Lessac popularize this voice and body system. Lessac Technologies, Inc. (LTI) was created in 2000, and developed computer software for text-to-speech technology (TTS). As chairman of the venture, Wilson worked with the CIO, his longtime associate, Gary A. Marple, to obtain several patents in the two years before his death at the age of 82. Upon Wilson's death, John Reichenbach became President of the company.

== Civic contributions ==
=== Peace Corps ===
In 1964, Don Wilson was appointed by President Lyndon Johnson as the second Peace Corps director for Ethiopia, the third largest country program at the time. He and his family moved to Addis Ababa for two years. Escorted by outgoing director (and fellow World Federalist) Harris Wofford, he presented his credentials to the Government. Emperor Haile Selassie said to him, in English, "Mr. Wilson, I fear you will have a more difficult time than your predecessor, for our students have begun to have ideas." Drawing on his international relations background and his war experience, he managed up to 700 volunteers at one time in the country, and he and his wife traveled throughout the mountainous region by Land Rover and Cessna plane and through East Africa on holidays with his family. Wilson studied and spoke Amharic and some Swahili, and conversed in prep school French with foreign officials. He toured schools, clinics, road building projects, and the full range of Peace Corps projects. One of the volunteers and lifelong friends was Paul Tsongas of Lowell, MA. His medical staff included Dr. E. Fuller Torrey, who later founded the National Association for Mental Illness (NAMI).

=== United World Federalists ===
In 1949, Wilson did some volunteer work for the United World Federalists (UWF), "meanwhile studying the movement quite carefully." In June 1949, he was recruited by Cord Meyer to be office manager of the ten-man office of the New York State Branch of the United World Federalists. He then worked in various capacities for UWF in New York, Connecticut, and New England. As Executive Director of the Connecticut Branch December 1950 - April 1952, he planned and managed a fight in the Connecticut Legislature concerning federalist legislation adopted in 1949 and attacked by many isolationist groups. (This is when he met his wife.) After a five-month controversy, the legislation was retained by a close vote. Then he was asked to become Executive Director of the New England Council, which he had helped organize. In that position, he supervised the political work, field organizing, educational work and fund raising for the six New England states. He later worked out of the Midwest region, based out of Cleveland, Ohio.

Among the lifelong friends who were leaders of the UWF were Norman Cousins, the editor of Saturday Review magazine, Randolph Compton and Dorothy Danforth Compton, C. Max Stanley, and George C. Holt. He worked closely with Rodney Shaw, a United Methodist Church minister the group's Midwest director during the same period. All of them went on to distinguish themselves as leaders on key issues of the times such as nuclear disarmament, world peace, support for the U.N., population control, and civil and human rights.

In August 1955, Wilson resigned from the UWF after a dispute between the local chapters and the national leadership. He was later offered various positions including National Executive Vice-President, all of which he declined. Finally, in 1970, he returned at the request of Dr. Luther Evans (former Librarian of Congress and head of UNESCO) as Chairman to modernize the organization.

=== New Directions ===
He remained involved in international issues for the rest of his life. He advocated for the creation of a U.S. National Service program including the Peace Corps. As Chair of the World Federalists from 1970 - 1977, he worked with Margaret Mead, Father Theodore Hesburgh, Robert McNamara, Luther Evans and James Grant to found New Directions, an ambitious attempt to create a citizen's lobby on international issues. Using his corporate experience, Wilson was instrumental in introducing the use of opinion polling, public affairs advertising, direct mail marketing techniques and focus group research (aided by his longtime friend Lester Wunderman, CEO of the advertising firm Young & Rubicam) to understand donor behavior to international issues. Wunderman and he believed that such modern lobbying techniques were essential to creating political support for international issues. The organization was credited with helping to win passage of the Panama Canal Treaty, but ultimately did not obtain the necessary financial support for long term viability.

=== Death ===
Wilson never retired. In 2006 at the age of 82, he died suddenly in front of his computer while sending email and voicemail about voice technology.
