= Lessac Technologies =

Lessac Technologies, Inc. (LTI) is an American firm which develops voice synthesis software, licenses technology and sells synthesized novels as MP3 files. The firm currently has seven patents granted and three more pending for its automated methods of converting digital text into human-sounding speech, more accurately recognizing human speech and outputting the text representing the words and phrases of said speech, along with recognizing the speaker's emotional state.

The LTI technology is partly based on the work of the late Arthur Lessac, a Professor of Theater at the State University of New York and the creator of Lessac Kinesensic Training, and LTI has licensed exclusive rights to exploit Arthur Lessac's copyrighted works in the fields of speech synthesis and speech recognition. Based on the view that music is speech and speech is music, Lessac's work and books focused on body and speech energies and how they go together. Arthur Lessac's textual annotation system, which was originally developed to assist actors, singers, and orators in marking up scripts to prepare for performance, is adapted in LTI's speech synthesis system as the basic representation of the speech to be synthesized (Lessemes), in contrast to many other systems which use a phonetic representation.

LTI's software has two major components: (1) a linguistic front-end that converts plain text to a sequence of prosodic and phonosensory graphic symbols (Lessemes) based on Arthur Lessac's annotation system, which specify the speech units to be synthesized; (2) a signal-processing back-end that takes the Lessemes as acoustic data and produces human-sounding synthesized speech as output, using unit selection and concatenation.

LTI's text-to-speech system came in second in the world-wide Blizzard Challenge 2011 and 2012. The first-place team in 2011 also employed LTI's "front-end" technology, but with its own back-end. The Blizzard Challenge, conducted by the Language Technologies Institute of Carnegie Mellon University, was devised as a way to evaluate speech synthesis techniques by having different research groups build voices from the same voice-actor recordings, and comparing the results through listening tests.

LTI was founded in 2000 by H. Donald Wilson (chairman), a lawyer, LexisNexis entrepreneur and business associate of Arthur Lessac; and Gary A. Marple (chief inventor), after Marple suggested that Arthur Lessac's kinesensic voice training might be applicable to computational linguistics. After Wilson's death in 2006, his nephew John Reichenbach became the firm's CEO.
