= Verner W. Clapp =

American librarian (1901–1972)

Verner Clapp
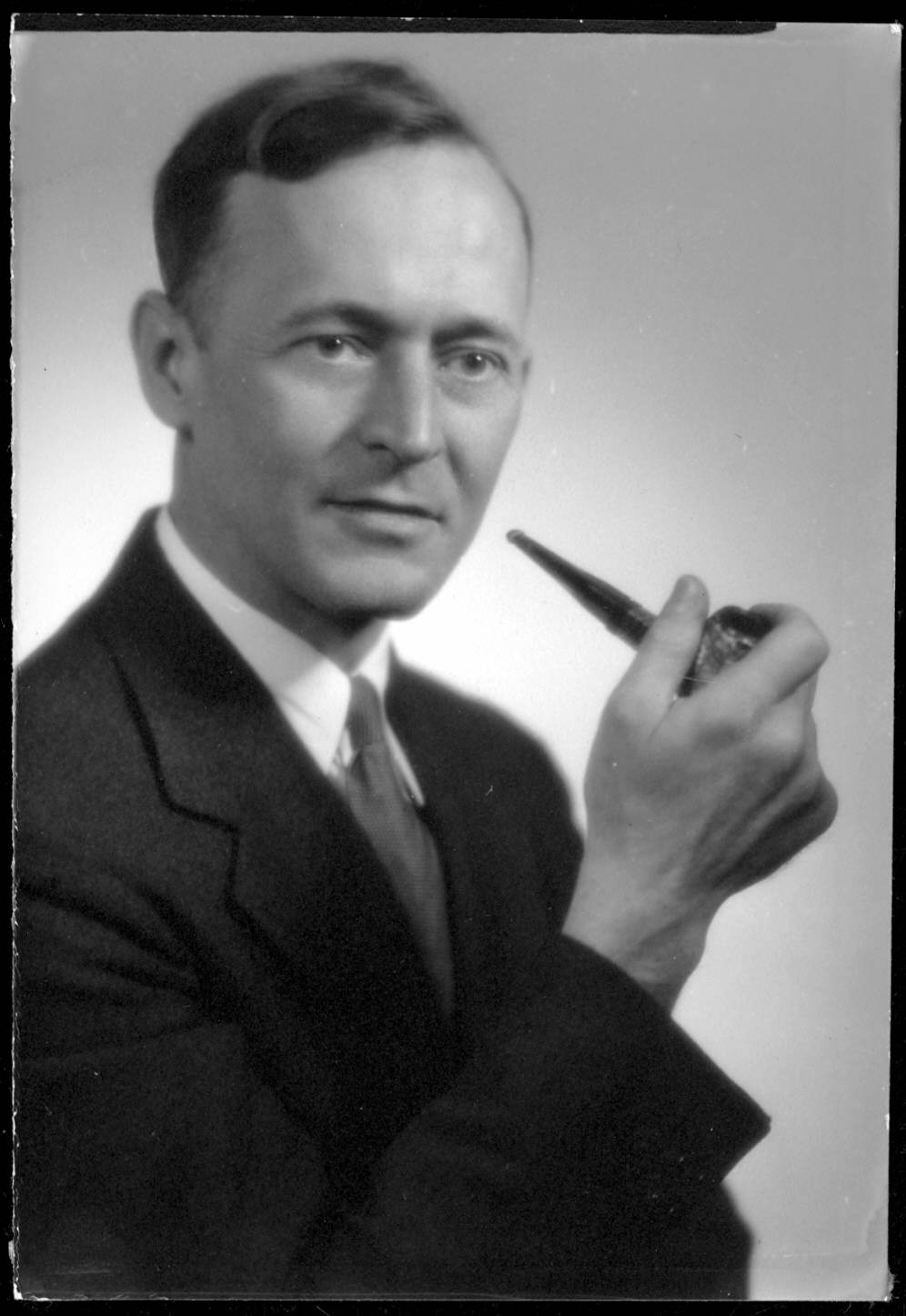

Librarian of Congress
- Acting
- In office July 6, 1953 – August 30, 1954
- President: Dwight D. Eisenhower
- Preceded by: Luther H. Evans
- Succeeded by: Lawrence Quincy Mumford

Personal details
- Born: Verner Warren Clapp; June 3, 1901 Johannesburg, Transvaal (now South Africa)
- Died: June 15, 1972 (aged 71) Alexandria, Virginia, U.S.
- Education: Trinity College, Connecticut (BA); Harvard University

Verner Warren Clapp (June 3, 1901 – June 15, 1972) was a librarian, writer, and polymath.

Starting as a summer clerk at the Library of Congress in 1922, Clapp rose to chief assistant librarian and acting Librarian of Congress. In 1956, he left the Library to serve as the first President of the Council on Library Resources. In these and other capacities, Clapp significantly contributed to administrative and technological modernization of the Library of Congress and to librarianship generally.

Known to his peers as "Mr. Librarian", a "library giant" "the librarian's librarian", and, among other accolades, "the library world's Da Vinci" across his varied career Clapp earned tremendous professional and personal respect and many of the library industry's highest honors and awards. Librarian of Congress Lawrence Quincy Mumford said of Clapp, "His contributions to the Library of Congress and to the library world are so varied and numerous that one is staggered at the knowledge that a single person in his lifetime could accomplish this." Librarian of Princeton University, William S. Dix, said of Clapp, he was "close to the center of almost every important development in scholarly librarianship for at least 30 years".

Clapp never formally trained in librarianship, having received an A.B. from Trinity College, Hartford, Connecticut and studied graduate-level philosophy at Harvard University. Instead, he applied a practical mind and insatiable curiosity to problem solving, coordination and technological solutions. Clapp's professional focus and accomplishments include materials preservation, library cooperation, technology, including microfilm and computerization, copyright, fair use, Cataloging in Publication (CIP), inter-library networking and cooperation and user access. Clapp also played significant roles in the preservation of the Declaration of Independence and other foundational documents during World War II, post-War library acquisitions, and the creation of both the United Nations Library (now Dag Hammarskjöld Library) and the Japanese National Diet Library.

== Early life ==
Clapp was born in Johannesburg, South Africa (then "Transvaal") to an English mother, Mary Sybil Helms Clapp, and an American father, George Herbert Clapp. Mary Helms, daughter of Danish mining engineer Ludvig Verner Helms, was born in Sarawak in Borneo and educated in Europe and had moved to the Transvaal to work in a law office when she met George Clapp, an American entrepreneur from Dover, New Hampshire, who was in Johannesburg to sell bicycles. They were married in 1898. During the Second Boer War, Mary Clapp served as a British army nurse.

In 1905 the family moved to the United States, settling in Poughkeepsie, New York, where George Clapp's brother ran a drug store. Clapp and his father took long hikes across the countryside and swam in the Hudson River, which led to Clapp's life-long passion for brisk, extended walks and the outdoors. Clapp credited a foundry across from his home for his fascination with machinery and mechanical processes, as the foundry workers entertained his questions and curiosity. Throughout his childhood Clapp was an avid reader who, he said, "finished most of Dickens, and Scott by the time I was fourteen", as well as Herodotus, given him by his mother for his fourteenth birthday and which he later read in Greek.

From Poughkeepsie High School, Clapp attended Trinity College, graduating with an A.B. in 1922. Clapp was captain of the Trinity track team, member of Sigma Nu fraternity, joined the Student Army Training Corps in 1918 (see Reserve Officers' Training Corps) and was inducted into Phi Beta Kappa in 1921. In 1922, he enrolled at Harvard University to study graduate-level philosophy, where he studied under Bertrand Russell. He additionally audited literature courses by John Livingston Lowes and Irving Babbitt, "to whom", Clapp recollected, "I suppose I am more indebted than I know. And of course, there is T.S. Eliot – and so many others."

== Career at Library of Congress ==
Clapp's 33-year span at the Library of Congress was described by a biographer as "a career of immense diversity and depth, a career not likely to be matched in today's age of specialization". Such rise in "specialization" came hand-in-hand with enormous technological change, making Clapp's entrance to librarianship, although unintended, propitious. Clapp scoffed at distinctions in the field between "the librarian as bookman and the librarian as retriever of information", as an interviewer queried of him in 1965, calling it: "sheer baloney". Educated in the liberal arts and philosophy, fascinated by books, gadgets, technology, and ideas—and untrained in librarianship, Clapp's contribution to what he called the "professional memory," was enormous, to which his peers would repeatedly attest, such as his entry in the Dictionary of American Library Biography: "His interests were so broad and his knowledge so extensive that one is baffled in trying to highlight his accomplishments." While promoting the study of librarianship for others, it was his overarching view of the field as a human and not just professional endeavor that yielded such a diverse and acclaimed career that started, quite literally, at the reference desk of the Library of Congress's Main Reading Room. At the 1956 dedication to the National Library of Canada, Clapp described his vision for libraries and, as such, his professional purpose: "Libraries are the repositories of man's tradition, and so, in a manner of speaking, of his collective soul."

=== Summer internship and career start ===
During the summer of 1922, Clapp joined his parents, who had moved to Washington, D.C., and found temporary work at the Library of Congress as a cataloger in the Manuscript Division. There, Clapp filled in for another cataloger who, Clapp recalled, "usually turned out in a year somewhat less than a third of what I turned out that summer". Clapp cataloged collections relating to the American Revolution, the Civil War and the papers of Reverdy Johnson, whose "execrable penmanship", Clapp said, "was even worse than that of Horace Greeley, which was notably bad".

"Le Livre Est Livré Au Lecteur. Washington D.C., 1937." Photograph. https://www.loc.gov/item/2014648201/. Lantern slide showing the book about Napoleon being handed to a researcher in the Main Reading Room at the Library of Congress. The man delivering the book is Verner Clapp and the man receiving the book is Charles Martel. (1937) (Library of Congress)

"Disenchanted" with study of philosophy at Harvard, Clapp returned to the Library of Congress the following year, "thinking then that I would put in a year there before deciding on a profession". Employed as an assistant reference librarian in the Main Reading Room, Clapp recalled, "They turned me loose and I began to explore this extraordinary institution into which I had fallen." Clapp engaged his innate curiosity to learn about the Library, as "I had no qualifications for the job whatsoever except a simple B.A. and I had had no library experience except my stint during the summer." On "slow evenings", Clapp would seek out chief cataloger and famed librarian, Charles Martel (creator of the Library of Congress classification system), "And then I would talk to him about cataloging problems for an hour before slipping back to work." From there Clapp immersed himself in librarianship, crediting significant influence from Librarian of Congress Herbert Putnam, whose reports to Congress Clapp read studiously, Charles C. Jewett, Librarian of the Smithsonian, John Shaw Billings, creator of the Library of the Surgeon General's Office, Harry Miller Lydenberg of the New York Library, and Melvil Dewey.

=== Mid-career and promotions ===
After five years at the Main Reading Room, Clapp was tasked as the first head of the Congressional Unit, which had started in 1914 as the Legislative Reference Bureau and which was the precursor to the Congressional Research Service. The Congressional Unit was charged with responding to requests for information from Congress, primarily by collating research and publications from government organizations and agencies. In 1931, Clapp was named Special Assistant to the Superintendent of the Reading Room. In this position, Clapp and his colleague, David C. Mearns, researched the early locations of the Supreme Court, cataloged the existing books in the Library from Jefferson's personal library, and helped catalog President Calvin Coolidge's books in the White House and the library of Oliver Wendell Holmes Jr. First Lady Eleanor Roosevelt requested of Clapp and Mearns a history of the White House egg roll, for which the pair produced a monograph with two editions, one listing Clapp and Mearns as authors and the other Mearns and Clapp, which caused a "minor panic" among catalogers.

Clapp additionally supervised the Division of Books for the Adult Blind, for which he was credited with expanding the program, including to earn it "separate annual appropriation" to "provide books for the use of the adult blind readers in the United States", as well as to develop standards for Braille and other Library services for the blind. In 1937, Clapp was promoted to Assistant Superintendent of the Reading Room, and in 1940 was named Director of the Administrative Department.

=== Library of Congress reorganization ===
In 1939, Archibald MacLeish took over as Librarian of Congress from Putnam, who had served as Librarian for forty years. Following recommendations of the Librarian's Committee, consisting of three outside technical experts, and with Clapp's close guidance and direct input, MacLeish reorganized the Library's 35 administrative units into three departments (excepting statutory offices of Copyright and the Law Library), Administrative, Reference, and Processing, placing Clapp as budget officer and administrative assistant of the Administrative Department, overseeing personnel, accounting, buildings and grounds and publications. In 1943, MacLeish moved all acquisition activities into a new Acquisitions Department headed by Clapp (and abolishing the Administrative Department).

Clapp remained at the Library until 1956, having served as Chief Assistant Librarian and Acting Librarian, roles and events for which are outlined below.

== Preservation of the Declaration of Independence during World War II ==
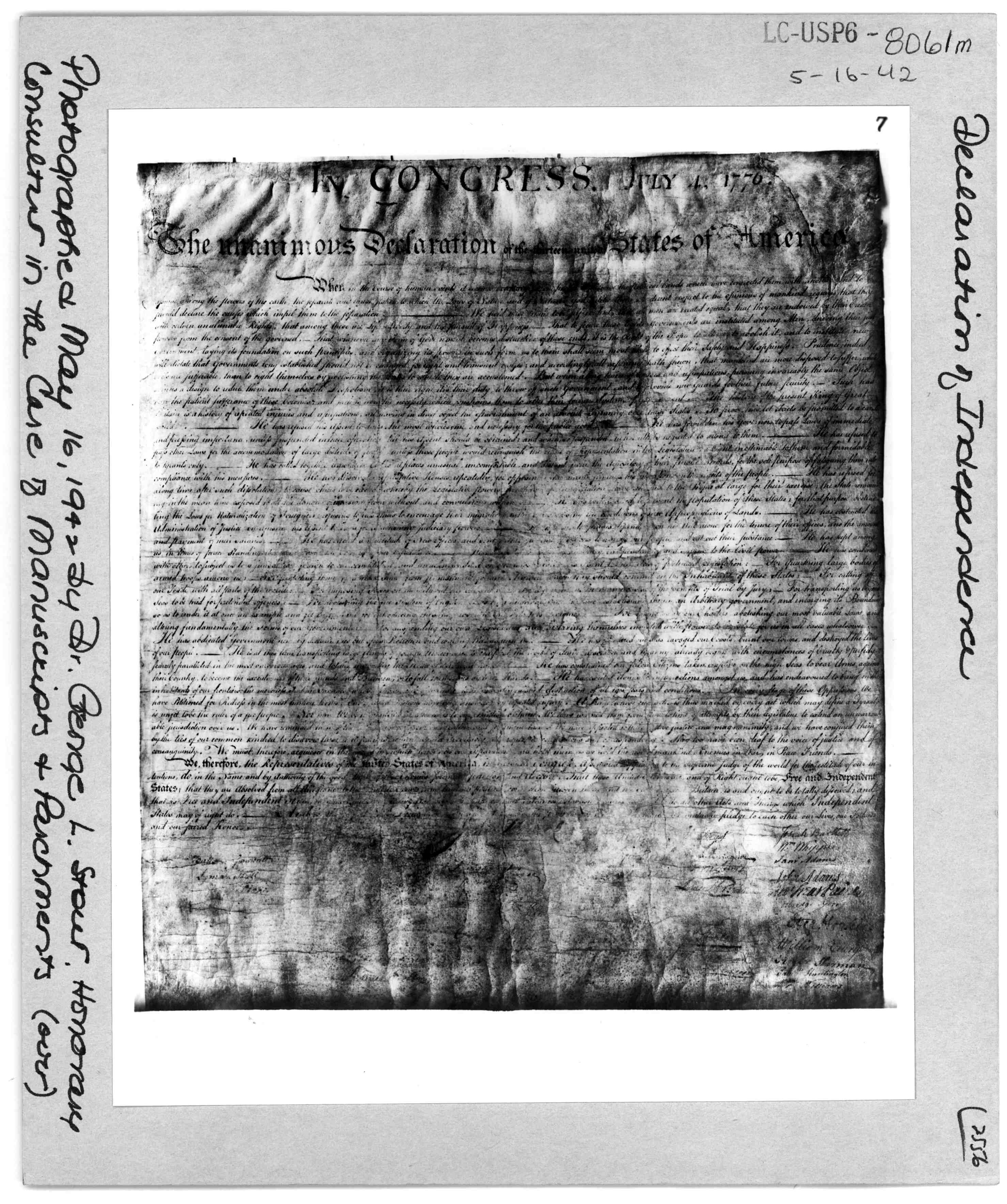
Photograph of the Declaration of Independence (noted as having been taken on May 16, 1942 but likely taken on May 13),

In 1940, Great Britain sent to the United States the Lincoln Cathedral copy of Magna Carta for its protection. Following U.S. entry to the War, Clapp was charged with oversight and protection of that document and other important documents, including the Declaration of Independence, the Articles of Confederation, and the U.S. Constitution, as well as a Gutenberg Bible and the Library's extensive collection of Stradivarius violins. Clapp coordinated the move of these documents and artifacts to the United States Bullion Depository at Fort Knox, Kentucky, and, most importantly, their proper protection from atmospheric exposure and deteriorating conditions by placing them in waterproof, hermetically sealed containers. Other materials were moved to fireproof buildings at several universities, and over 8 million catalog cards were microfilmed for duplication.

=== Deteriorated condition ===
In 1971, Clapp published "The Declaration of Independence: A Case Study in Preservation", in which he described the Declaration as "one of the most abused documents in the history of preservation of documents". Chronicling how, following the August 2, 1776 signing by most members of the Continental Congress, as absent members arrived to add their signatures, the Declaration was "pulled out, unrolled, signed and rolled up again" and subsequently "stuffed into a barrel and carried off in a cart, through all types of weather", as the document was vacated during the Revolutionary War from Philadelphia to Baltimore, Annapolis, York, and Trenton, and, again in 1814 during the British invasion of Washington, D.C., to a hiding place in Leesburg, Virginia. Worst of all, President John Quincy Adams had ordered a wet-pressing to reprint the document and distribute copies across the country. "The document has never quite recovered from that wet-pressing," noted Clapp. In 1880, a committee at the National Academy of Sciences recommended protecting the document from light, as it had been on display at the State Department in plain air. In 1921, it was delivered to the Library of Congress, which, cataloged and photographed it, then placed it on public display under glass. On January 9, 1940, the Captain of the Guards of the Declaration reported a crack in its upper right-hand corner, the result, it was determined, of expansion and contraction of the document from exposure to changing atmospheric conditions over time.

=== Preparation and storage at Fort Knox ===
Accordingly, Librarian MacLeish created the position, "Keeper of the Collections", to monitor the Declaration and other important historical documents. Meanwhile, the Library engaged experts in preservation of art works and historical documents from the Isabella Stewart Gardner Museum, Harvard's Fogg Art Museum and the British Museum The Library set in place its contingencies for war, including to reserve forty cubic feet of storage space at Fort Knox, where a bronze, hermetically sealed case was to be placed to hold the Declaration and the Constitution. To move the documents, the case was placed into an oak box packed with "rock wool" to protect against fire and water damage. Along with two Secret Service Agents, Clapp accompanied the documents' transfer by train to Fort Knox, where the lower vaults maintained 59% humidity.

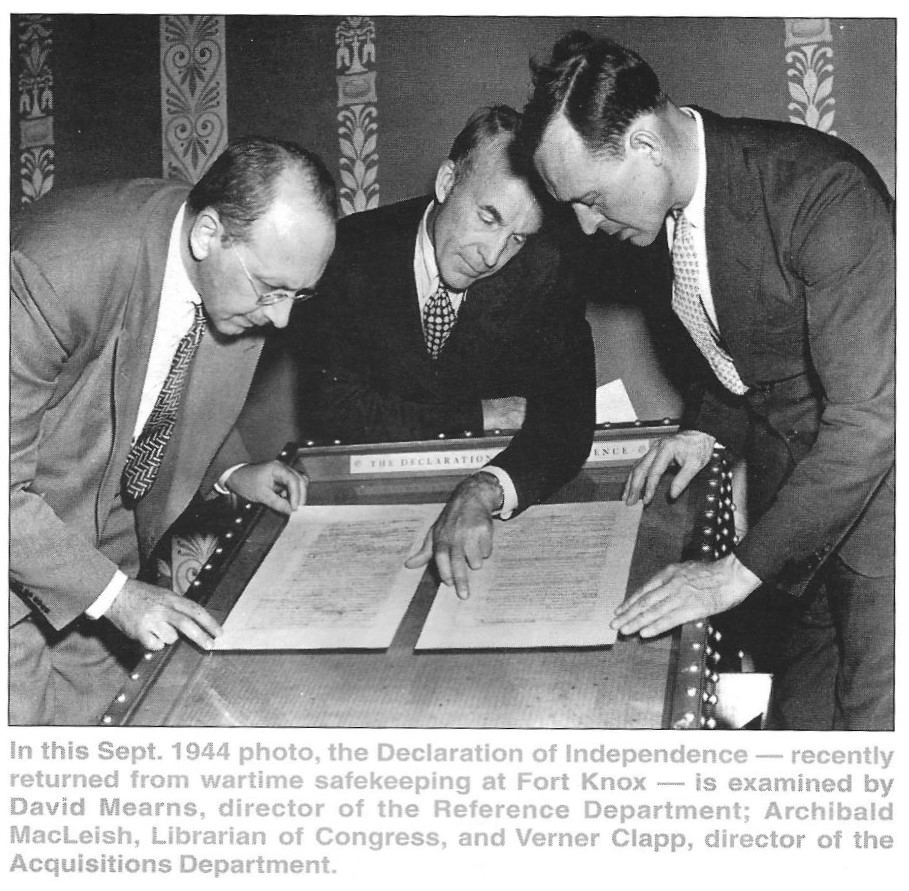
The Declaration of Independence being examined by Library of Congress officials upon its return from wartime safekeeping at Fort Knox, Sept. 1944

Now secured, Clapp next oversaw implementation of prior plans to properly restore and preserve the Declaration. On May 14, 1942, conservator George L. Stout of the Fogg Museum and Evelyn Ehrlich of the Gardner Museum extracted the document from its container and commenced the delicate process of removing it from its mount, "a pulp board with green velvet, and various glues, Scotch tape and other adhesives". After various consultations, it was decided to encapsulate the Declaration and the Constitution in sealed containers with slightly humidified helium along with an additional paper, created by the Bureau of Standards, to act as absorbent should a dew point arise. In 1952, these and other documents were transferred to the National Archives.

=== Focus on preservation ===
Clapp's role in the preservation of the Declaration of Independence was exemplary of his talents as librarian and administrator to set priorities, seek expert consultation, and coordinate implementation. The larger experience informed Clapp of the need for building a "body of literature" for document restoration and preservation, where none had previously existed. Clapp coordinated its collation from experts at the National Academy of Sciences, the Gardner Museum, and the Library of Congress itself. The experience solidified Clapp's latter-career focus on preservation. He wrote,

Some conclusions may be drawn from this story. First, it is apparent that the topic of preservation has been neglected in the professional discussions of librarians .... We need manuals; we need research .... We need training. There should be more jobs such as that of the Keeper of the Collections in the Library of Congress. Preservation must become an important part of the profession.

== World War II and aftermath ==
=== WWII efforts ===
As first director of the Acquisitions Department, starting in 1943, Clapp focused on "programs in support of the war effort". Such wartime efforts included creation of records for teaching Arabic to troops heading to Africa, handbooks for troops, and supplying maps from the Library collections. Clapp bragged, "We prepared and distributed for use of government agencies a 96-page bibliography on North Africa within two weeks of the landing of U.S. troops."

=== Post-War military book distribution and acquisitions ===
After the War, Clapp supervised collection and redistribution of textbooks from the military in order to redistribute them to "institutions of higher learning at minimal cost". Clapp reoriented materials search from subject to geographic origin, which greatly enhanced the efforts of the Cooperative Acquisitions Project following the war that "aimed at securing European publications produced during the war but hitherto unavailable" and "buying all they could".

As head of the Library of Congress mission to Europe to secure collections following wartime devastation, Clapp negotiated release of $100,000 pre-War orders by American libraries from booksellers in Russian-occupied Leipzig. The Cooperative Acquisitions Project yielded some two million European publications that were acquired for the Library of Congress and over 100 other U.S. libraries. These experiences enhanced Clapp's appreciation for the practical utility of libraries and as agents for the common good, for which he argued in his seminal work, The Future of the Research Library:

"The democratization of the library—the great achievement to which American librarianship should pride itself—need not result in diluted scholarship, but should result in greatly widened usefulness of these institutions wherein the experience of mankind is recorded."

== United Nations Library ==
=== San Francisco Conference ===
In 1945, following the War, Clapp was charged with curating a library for the United Nations conference at San Francisco, thus establishing the foundations for the United Nations Library. He coordinated distribution of U.N. founding documents to libraries around the world, which initially required translation of the U.N. Charter into five languages.

=== Establishment of the United Nations Library ===
In August 1946, the United Nations secretary-general ordered formation of a formal library division. The UN library holdings had been housed at Hunter College in New York and then at the temporary United Nations facility at Lake Success, CT and supervised by the United Nations Information Office, which was disbanded in 1947. In April of that year, the Secretariat organized a committee of experts to set criteria for establishment of a permanent library. The committee recommended focus on reference and bibliographic services "rather than on accumulation and preservation of a large collection" and that a "competent librarian be engaged" to guide decisions, especially as regarding collection size and required space. Along with John E. Burchard of the Massachusetts Institute of Technology, a "library building expert", Clapp was engaged to set criteria for the collection. Clapp interviewed principals at the Secretariat and issued a report on May 3, 1947 with recommendation for "stack space for 500,000 volumes" for ten to twenty years and for 1,000,000 volumes for needs over thirty-eight years. Clapp additionally recommended that the Library make use of interlibrary loans in order to access the extensive existing collections in New York City and to avoid "unnecessary duplication". Based on the recommendations of Clapp and Burchard (who felt that a maximum space for 500,000 volumes would suffice), the Division of Library Services and Department of Public Information was established in 1948.

Clapp next served as vice-chairman of a committee organized to create a formal policy statement that was subsequently adopted by the General Assembly in December 1949. The report followed Clapp's original recommendation that, "the emphasis will be on service and immediate usefulness, not on accumulation and preservation."

== Creation of the Japanese Diet Library ==
In December 1947, Clapp left for Japan as head of the Library of Congress mission to Tokyo, Japan to coordinate legislation for and establishment of the Japanese National Diet Library. His work garnered praise from the Supreme Commander of the Allies Douglas MacArthur and Hitoshi Ashida, Japanese Foreign Minister and, later, Prime Minister. The National Diet Library (NDL) inherited collections from the Imperial Diet libraries (established 1890) and the Imperial Library (established 1872). Following the direction of the U.S. Library mission, Article 130 of the Diet Law of 1948 declared, "The National Diet Library shall be established in the Diet by a separate law, in order to assist Diet Members in their study and research."

=== Clapp Collection at Diet Library ===
On November 12, 1968, on the twentieth anniversary of the creation of the Diet Library, Clapp and his wife, Dorothy Devereaux Clapp, traveled to Japan where he was awarded the Merit of Second Class of the Order of the Sacred Treasure, "which became one of his most cherished honors among many professional awards". Following his death in 1973, Dorothy Clapp donated books and materials to form the "Clapp Collection" at the National Diet Library. According to the Library, "In doing this she was carrying out the wishes of Clapp, who always expressed his gratitude for having been involved in the foundation of the NDL. The collection has been named 'Clapp Collection' to honor his achievements." Additionally, the National Diet Library website notes that Clapp "was remembered by many Japanese for his passionate devotion to the job, his warm-hearted sense of humor and his sincere modesty towards his Japanese colleagues even though his stay in Japan was only a little less than two months."

== Chief Assistant Librarian ==
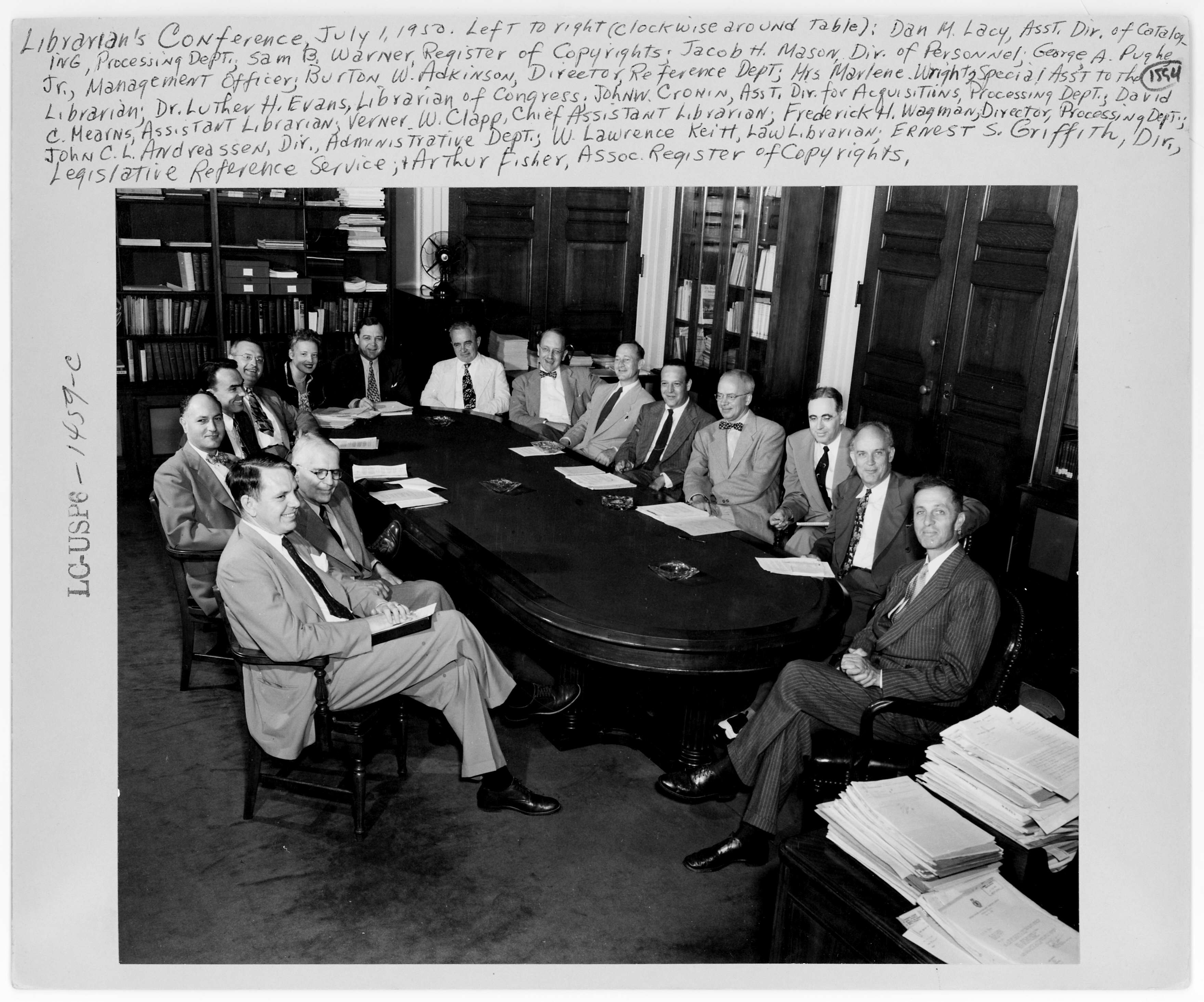
Photograph of the Librarian's Conference, July 1, 1950. Librarian Luther Evans is at the head of the table; Clapp is third to his right.

=== Appointment ===
In March 1947, just before the U.S. Mission to Japan, Librarian of Congress Luther H. Evans named Clapp Chief Assistant Librarian of Congress, an appointment "responsive to a wide popular demand", according to Evans. From this position, Clapp engaged broader Library policies and priorities. The position allowed Clapp "to keep a finger in every pie inside the library and out".

=== Loyalty program ===
In 1947, President Harry S. Truman issued Executive Order 9835 to ensure the "loyalty" of all Executive department employees. Librarian Evans voluntarily included the Library of Congress, not an executive branch agency, over concerns for Congressional appropriations and voluntary compliance with Civil Service regulations.

In June 1948, the American Library Association (ALA) "adopted a Resolution Protesting Loyalty Investigations in Libraries", thus opposing Library of Congress enforcement of the Loyalty program. As the political demands increased, the Library fell into the position of having to balance the protections of employees against the political and appropriations pressures of Congress. Evans tasked Clapp with implementation of the Loyalty program, requiring Clapp to navigate the political and legal demands of the Loyalty program on employees, which came to include homosexuality on the grounds of susceptibility to blackmail. Clapp, whose time and attention was exhausted by this issue, wrote to a professional colleague that "loyalty investigations are just about as 'desirable' as jails and sewers" but which "owe their existence to the same cause-man's imperfection". In 1956, Clapp published a nine-page letter to the editors of The Washington Post and the Washington Times-Herald denouncing the "Star Chamber proceedings... to which penalties are attached (the penalties of dismissal and disbarment from employment) without being permitted to confront their accusers or even know their identity". In her review of the episode, Louise Robbins chronicles Clapp's navigation of competing and contradictory policies, politics, and demands, public and private, and within the Library, and concluded that "Clapp used his power within ALA to keep the association's position on loyalty programs from condemning the very practices he was charged with implementing".

Fellow librarian Frederick H. Wagman recalled, "It was a painful experience made agonizing by our insights into the weaknesses of the procedure, the ineptitude of the investigators, the recording of the permanent record of gossip and hearsay, the opportunity for character assassination. Verner was one of the very few government officials who had the courage to speak out and do so forcibly." Ann L. Hallstein, Chief of the Records Management Division of the Copyright Office (and formerly a planning assistant to the Librarian), wrote, "Clapp (and Wagman) placed a high value on the individual employee's right to be trusted until proven unworthy of that trust, in matters of loyalty or anything else."

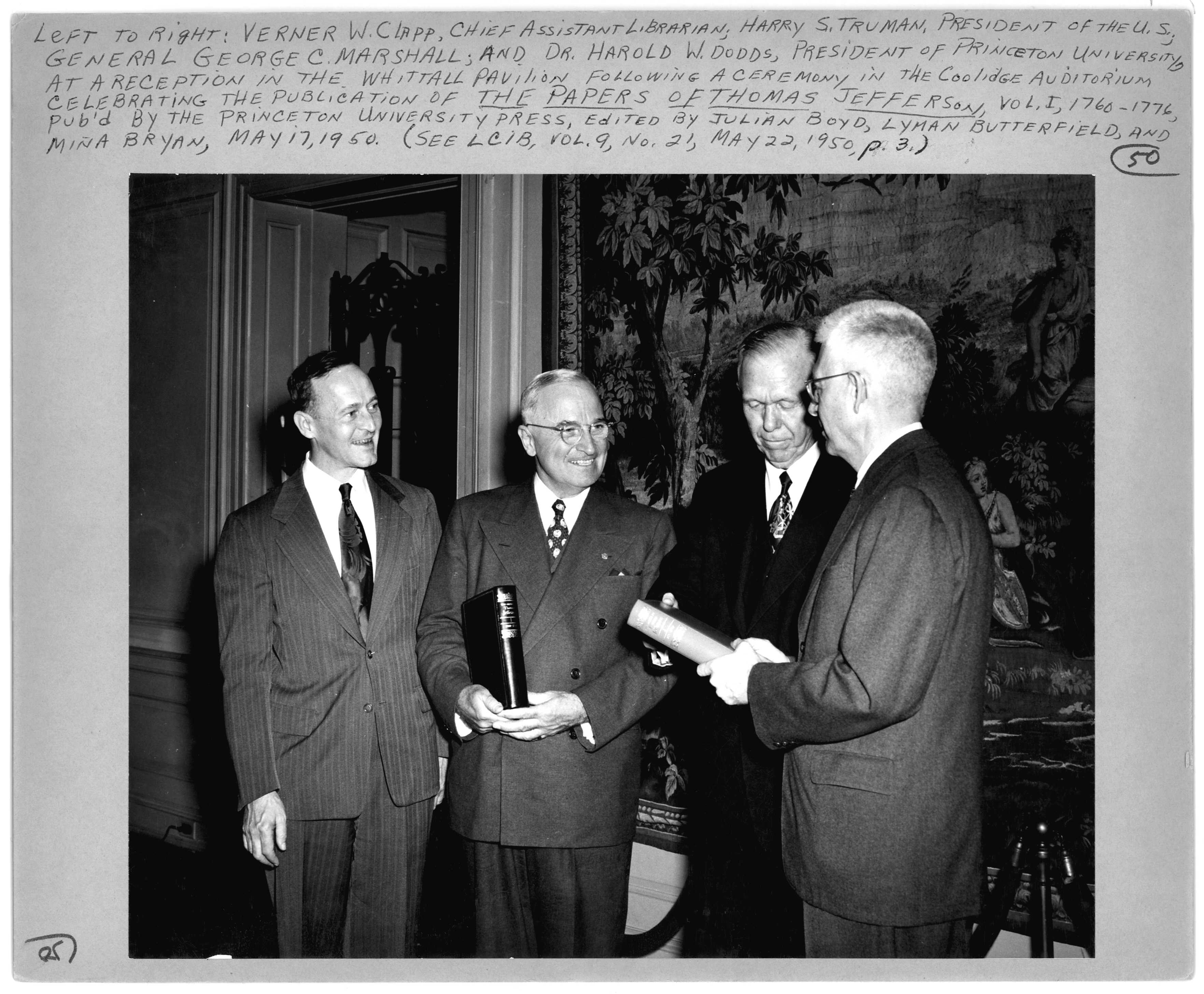
Verner Clapp with President Truman at a 1950 Library of Congress celebration of publication of the Papers of Thomas Jefferson

=== Projects ===
Among projects and priorities, Clapp assisted in the launch of the Library's National Union Catalog of Manuscript Collections, promoted "microforms as a means of preservation and medium for storage", investigated copyright law and library deposit requirements, including to explore possibilities of cataloging-in-source. Clapp additionally reoriented Library acquisition policies, advanced interlibrary cooperation, especially regarding microfilm, and addressed issues of space and stack maintenance. Most importantly, Clapp promoted the idea that "all library service is local library service – it is where the reader is, and 999 parts out of 1000 of him is in his home, his office, his lab, his school or his library. National library development as we are finding out... is the sum of local library development."

Typically, Clapp responded to objections to his program with insight and humor, such as his note to the ALA regarding distribution of materials to depository libraries: "I inquired whether the association wanted us to burn the books rather than distribute them free." Clapp was enormously popular within the library community and LC staff. On the day of his appointment to Chief Assistant Librarian, the Manuscript division wore black. Clapp's popularity amongst the staff was reciprocal: "Busy, totally involved with his work, always perched on the cutting edge of all new developments in library science. Clapp nonetheless had time and concern for staff."

=== CIA liaison ===
Following World War II, the U.S. government became deeply concerned with managing documents and information, especially top-secret materials. Starting in the early 1950s, the Central Intelligence Agency (CIA) reached out to the Library of Congress for its expertise. As Chief Assistant Librarian, Clapp was assigned as the Library's liaison to the CIA. Following the common interest in development of document management technologies, upon starting the Council on Library Resources, Clapp maintained the relationship with the CIA, especially regarding microfilm and other document replication and management systems. For example, at a 1961 meeting of the National Microfilm Association, Clapp gave a talk titled "The Place for Microfilm in Records Management" and presided over a session on "library-archival application of microforms" that also featured Paul W. Howerton of the CIA, who spoke on "A Micro-film Unit Record System; a Case Study."

== Acting Librarian of Congress ==
In July, 1953, Clapp was appointed Acting Librarian of Congress following Luther Evans' departure at the request of President Truman to head UNESCO. As Acting Librarian, Clapp carried on with existing Library and personal priorities and policies. A notable event of his tenure was the honor to present at the White House a "specially inscribed" bibliography of the works of Winston Churchill prepared by the Reference Division. The Library's Annual Report to Congress noted, "Sir. Winston remarked that he planned to add to this bibliography a 'modest' work—a history of the English-speaking peoples, to run approximately 800,000 words." The Report also noted publication by the Library of "the most comprehensive list available of motion pictures from the birth of the industry in 1894 to 1949", an important collection of titles for the bibliographic record and copyright purposes.

=== Denial of Librarian of Congress appointment ===
It was understood by the Library staff, the librarian community, and by Clapp himself that he would be appointed next Librarian of Congress. Clapp "enlisted the aid of friends across the country" to promote his candidacy, which would require President Eisenhower's appointment and Senate confirmation. However, an episode related to his governance as Acting Librarian interfered. In that capacity, Clapp had approved an exhibit at the Library on propagandistic photo manipulation.

Called "Libraries in a Free world", the exhibit highlighted the infamous Soviet manipulation to remove Trotsky from a photo of him with Stalin, an example of Damnatio memoriae, by which an important historical actor is removed from the historical record in order to change the actual historical record. However, the exhibit compared the Soviet example with that of Maryland Senator John Marshall Butler, whose campaign, along with that of Senator Joseph McCarthy, had distributed a manipulated photograph of his opponent, Millard Tydings, superimposed with American Communist Party figure, Earl Browder. Wagman wrote, "It is said that the repercussions were resounding, in that this one defense of truth may have prevented a certain senator from supporting Clapp as a nominee for the position of librarian of Congress." Eisenhower nominated Quincy Mumford, who took office on September 1, 1954.

While Evans told Clapp, "Verner, good things await you elsewhere if you feel uncomfortable in remaining at LC," Clapp continued as Chief Assistant Librarian until 1956. During his final two years at the Library, Clapp published two important articles that highlighted "the development of Clapp's thinking on library problems ... Each emphasized Clapp's view of the seamless nature of library problems, 'access' and 'organization' being primary, and that libraries should 'direct attention to doing the best with what ... [they have] ... and under the conditions given.'"

== Council on Library Resources ==
In September 1956, Clapp resigned from the Library of Congress to become the first President of the Council on Library Resources (CLR) (now Council on Library and Information Resources). Inspired by Louis Booker Wright of the Folger Shakespeare Library and funded by the Ford Foundation, the primary mission of the CLR was to promote inter-library cooperation and development of library technologies with focus on the needs of academic and research libraries. Clapp advanced this mission through promotion of "machine-readable cataloging" technologies, development of the MARC format, cataloging-in-source, standards and technologies in permanent, durable paper and other preservation projects, cataloging of music, microfilm, and, above all, inter-library cooperation and coordination.

=== Origin and appointment as president of CLR ===
The direct origin of the CLR came of two conferences held at the Folger Library that Wright had organized to discuss his concerns about university library coordination, photoduplication technologies, and research librarianship (as opposed to general librarianship), and for which, at the suggestion of Fred Cole, he solicited and received funding from the Ford Foundation ($6,000 and $10,000 respectively). The first, held on January 15, 1955 with fifty participants, included Librarian of Congress Mumford and Chief Assistant Librarian Clapp, whom Mumford insisted be included. The second conference, held, on March 31, 1955 included a narrower group of fifteen, with, again, Mumford and Clapp, and produced a firm proposal that the Ford Foundation fund with a $5 million grant with its specific organization and purposes to be drafted by Clapp, who, according to former CLR president, Deanna B. Marcum, "had impressed the group with his grasp of library issues and was considered particularly rational in his approach".

The Council was formally launched In September 1956 with Clapp as its first president. Marcum observes, "From boyhood, Clapp had been a tinkerer... loved gadgets, and was forever thinking about what could be invented to make library jobs more efficient or streamlined." Furthermore, as an academic outsider and never trained as a librarian, "Clapp's fascination with applied technology brought into sharp focus the conflict that existed within the board between those who advocated pure research and those who wanted to pursue practice applications. From the day Clapp moved to the Council, he was anxious to do practical things."

=== Dispute over CLR direction ===
By 1958, Wright, serving on the CLR Board of Directors, "grew increasingly concerned about its influence and its results" and appealed to the Ford Foundation to "take action to redirect the council". Clapp oversaw a review of the Council's standing and reported that "two variant, although not necessarily contradictory, views within the membership of the Board of Directors concerning the direction which the Council's program should take... [to] support basic research aimed at making the fullest use of the capabilities of modern technology... [or] immediate development of devices and systems aimed at the practical solution of obvious and immediate problems." Marcum claims that, "Instead of choosing one direction over the other, the board and the advisors to the council yielded to the opinions of the 'professional librarian,' Verner Clapp." Clapp explained that the CLR board membership "was selected to represent the public interest in libraries, rather than that of librarians; and librarians are a minority in it".

At that time, members of the CLR Board of Directors represented private industry, directors of university and private libraries, university presidents and vice presidents, and a president of the American Bar Association (the two non-academics were former and current Chairman of the National Book Committee.) Wright's primary objection was to Gilbert Chapman, whom the Ford Foundation insisted upon placing as Chairman. Chapman was president of the Yale and Towne (formerly Yale Lock Manufacturing Co.) and who served as chairman of the National Book Committee and President of the New York Public Library. According to Marcum, Wright held a "deep bitterness toward Chapman, not as an individual, but as a type". Nevertheless, Clapp proceeded with his "very practical agenda, and he worked exceedingly hard to accomplish specific tasks... for he methodically chose what projects needed attention and then sought individuals and institutions that could work on the problem". Clapp articulated his approach, observing that, "Our ranks have included physicians, lawyers, chemists, and physicists, as well as philosophers, historians, and men of letters. There is no doubt that we have benefited from the cross-fertilization."

=== Focus on problem solving ===
In a March 1960 article published in the ALA Bulletin intended to inform ALA members about the purposes and activities of the CLR titled "'To Assist in solving the problems of libraries': The program of the Council on Library Resources", Clapp plainly described the CLR's purpose as "for getting some things done that need to be done". To identify those "things", Clapp explained, "First the Council went looking for problems. It found them by the score," including requests for "how to prepare for a censorship attack", lighting for lower-shelves in bookstacks, and "how to break up dating parties in the reading room", among issues that "didn't make sense". "Then..." Clapp wrote, "It received a group of proposals which were potentially so important that they could not be ignored, consisting of grants for funding ALA representation at a German conference "on the subject of code revision", a Rutgers University exploratory committee to identify "the points at which research and development might be profitably brought to bear", an investigation "to identify the causes of deterioration in paper in libraries and to attempt to find correctives", and "to establish a closed-circuit TV system between the main and a number of departmental libraries at the University of Virginia". Clapp reported that these projects were each fruitful, and some received additional funding from the CLR. Clapp noted that these initial projects helped the CLR identify "that its field of activity could best be projected" in four areas: cataloguing, reader access to materials, administrative support, and technological research.

=== CLR projects and grants ===
These projects included development of a "cooperative processing center for a number of independent libraries", development of "Cataloguing in Source" at the Library of Congress, book preservation, "studies of the most efficient use of library space" and "copying as a mechanism of physical access", including "an automatic book cradle/page turner", employment of facsimile transmission of text, "dry photocopying", and "microcopy". Marcum characterized these projects as "using technology to streamline cataloging procedures" and funding of "various educational and commercial institutions that promised to develop a new gadget – a new technological method – for solving a library problem". Clapp, on the other hand, conceived of these efforts as essential application of existing, large-scale industrial technologies to the more narrow purposes of libraries and their users, as well as to address the implications of these uses on copyright. Clapp summarized his purpose as aimed to resolve any "problem of library work", hoping that

nevermore need a book be thrown away just because its paper deteriorated; that cataloging information in internationally accepted form now accompanies each book wherever it goes; that techniques are now available to reduce enormously the costs of book circulation, or to speed up the provision of material to readers (without losing control of the reference copy) through cheap and rapid copying processes; or that the techniques of telefacsimile have been so adapted to library work that duplication of any but the books most used locally can immediately become a thing of the past.

To these ends, the CLR targeted grants for assisting in the development of the MEDLARS system for indexing medical literature at the National Library of Medicine, the "Machine Readable Cataloging" program, MARC, at the Library of Congress, which served as "an essential premise of a nationwide bibliographic network" and which "increased librarians' familiarity with computer technology" and "automated services", and Cataloging-in-Source initiatives to standardize cataloging of newly published books. In 1961, the CLR funded $100,000 to the Library of Congress for "a survey of the possibilities of automating the organization, storage, and retrieval of information in a large research library... not only from the point of view of the functioning of an individual institution but also from that of a research library whose activities are interrelated with those of other research libraries."

=== Clapp's CLR legacy ===
In Librarian Mumford's 1963 Report to Congress, the acknowledgements recognized, "In particular, the team appreciates the guidance and support given to it personally by Verner W. Clapp." The report affirmed many of Clapp's priorities as he had articulated in the 1960 ALA Bulletin article outlining the goals of the CLR. Indeed, as Hallstein observed in Clapp's entry in the Encyclopedia of Library and Information Science, "Clapp left his mark on the council, to the benefit of all. The council gave him the opportunity to extend his vision to the library world at large in a lasting way, for it funded dozens of projects which bore Clapp's imprimateur."

Other important programs initiated or envisioned by and during Clapp's tenure at the CLR include the National Union Catalog of Manuscript Collection, the Union List of Serials, the National Preservation Board, the Northeast Document Conservation Center, founded in 1973 by a grant from CLR and other organizations, the Brittle Books Project of 1967 and the subsequent Preservation Microfilming Office, established in 1968 at the Library of Congress and from which Digital, Sound, and Film preservation offices at the Library of Congress arose. Continuing Clapp's interest in book preservation and paper technologies, in 1985 the CLR, under president Warren J. Haas, coordinated a joint task force with the Association of American Universities to address "the problem of decaying scholarly materials in the nation's libraries and develop a national plan for collective action". The task force led to the Commission on Preservation and Access (CPA) of 1986, that, in conjunction with the National Endowment of the Humanities, then led to "massive microfilming projects in major research libraries", as well as, in the 1980s and early 1990s under the Brittle Books Program, creation of the Digital Library Federation under the now-named Council on Library and Information Resources, in 1994.

Clapp served on the National Advisory Commission on Libraries in 1966-1967 which developed legislation that established the National Commission on Libraries and Information Science.

== Book preservation ==
=== William Barrow ===
Clapp was ever concerned with preservation and paper deterioration, thus among the CRL's first grants was to the Virginia State Library to support the work of William J. Barrow. The grants set the basis for establishment of the Barrows Laboratory at the University of Virginia. While Barrow had earned his reputation as an expert on paper deterioration and restoration, including to create an industry standard process for restoration, Clapp's recognition of his work and CLR grants institutionalized Barrow's work and brought his expertise to mainstream librarian and publishing entities.

=== "The Story of permanent durable book-paper" ===
Clapp's book, The Story of permanent durable book-paper, 1115–1970, reviewed the technologies, techniques and materials of book-paper, from parchment to rag paper to wood pulp and their economy, utility and durability. Over time, Clapp explained, paper better met the needs of increasing volume. "To meet the ever-increasing demand for paper, accompanied by a correspondingly severe competition for high-quality raw materials, manufacturers began to adopt improvements in manufacturing technique which too often led to degradation of the product..." however, "The processes of degradation were slow at first and not immediately apprehended." Clapp credited Barrow with recognizing the role of acidity in paper degradation and applying the principle towards restoration in the "Barrow laminating process".

Increasing demand on paper into the 19th century led to time and materials saving, such as use of alum or bleach, which allowed fabricators to ignore problems of degradation while meeting demand. Clapp noted, "Even after the relationship of alum to deterioration had been demonstrated, it kept on conveniently slipping from notice." Into the 20th century, focus on materials took precedence over effects of acidity, which were instead blamed on atmospheric pollution. Clapp credits Barrow with forcing the issue of the impact of "internal elements" over atmospheric deterioration as the cause of acid-driven deterioration. Barrow's next project, Clapp documented, was on setting standards for acid-free paper, which the publishing industry subsequently embraced.

== Future of the Research Library ==
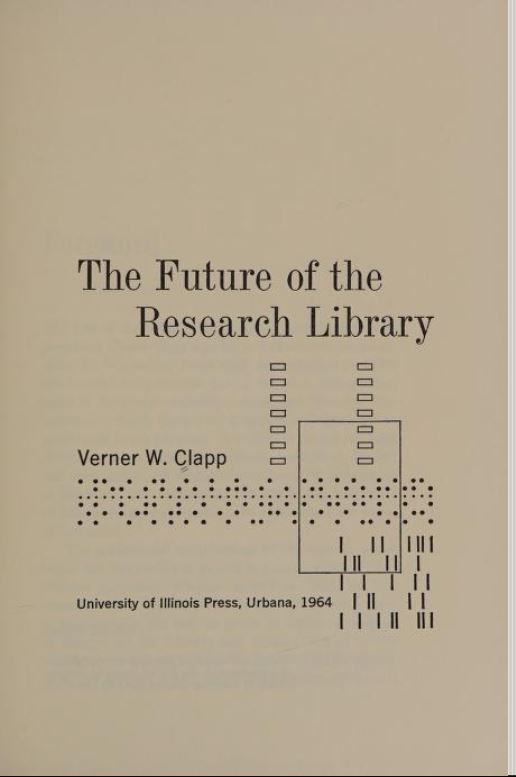
"The Future of the Research Library", by Verner W. Clapp, 1964, Clapp's seminal work on the future potential of research libraries, including computerization and electronic dissemination of information.

In 1964, Clapp published The Future of the Research Library, a compendium of his 1963 Windsor Lectures plus an appendix Clapp titled "The Problems of Research Libraries: Programs for Solution". The lectures encapsulated Clapp's overall missions to advance "local self-sufficiency" and "sharing the resources", from which he derived the challenges of libraries, both individually and collectively, to identify and address collections, preservation, cooperation, dissemination, and self-sufficiency, ever with an eye on expenditures and leveraging technologies from other industries. As Clapp wrote, "The real advantages should derive not from space-saving but from inexpensiveness of dissemination."

Clapp considered libraries as essential to democracy, which informed his view of the very role of libraries for collection, preservation and dissemination of information. Technology, for Clapp, then, must conform to this purpose. Contemporaneous readers understood Clapp's purpose but many entirely misunderstood his method. Donald Brown Engley, Librarian at Clapp's Alma Mater, Trinity College, wrote that, "while Clapp's words were written in the context of the development of computers to make the knowledge buried in printed books more readily accessible to potential users everywhere... they carry the same force in the more elementary matter of sharing of the basic responsibilities of acquisition and storage of resources for common and community use." Reviewer Nathan Reingold wrote that "Historians of technology... will not find this volume very enlightening; it is written by a librarian's librarian for his fellow practitioners." Ironically, Reingold criticized Clapp for the "assumption that the library of the future will either have a computer at its center or around its perimeter but that the store of information, miniaturized or not, will receive practically the same treatment as today." W. L. Williamson of Columbia University (biographer of William Frederick Poole) recognized Clapp's concern for "local self-sufficiency... micro-photography, storage collections, and deterioration of book stock" but dismissed his "brief chapter" in which "he suggests some of the principal uses he expects for electronic computers and other new devices." Clapp, on the other hand, saw those technological solutions as integral to and consistent with the overall mission to promote "the democratization of the library"—whatever form they may become. Where Clapp's contemporaries saw the limits, Clapp saw possibility.

=== Automation and technological solutions ===
While the solutions Clapp reviewed were drawn from existing CLR and other projects, especially the Library of Congress "Automation" report, his larger contribution in The Future of the Research Library was to clarify needs of research libraries and their solutions in abstract form and as a set of principles. As such, Clapp ventured into the possibilities of "electronic computers", not for their limits but for their possibilities. For example, Clapp wrote that "Telefacsimile has long offered an attractive possibility; for more than three decades it has been successfully used in newspaper work; why not also for libraries?" Ever practical-minded, Clapp recognized the cost of such systems (an entire day would be required for "scanning articles in journals while the whole pile of books could have been delivered by truck in an hour"), noting that, instead, "machine-readable form" can be "rapidly and inexpensively" transmitted by telephone. As a biographer noted, "It seems Clapp foresaw the possibilities of networking and the necessity for strong regional and local systems before such terms were even fashionable, let alone discussed seriously."

=== Microfilm ===
While discussing the technical potential of microcopy (see Microform), Clapp wondered if current applications "failed to discriminate between the value of miniaturizing for the mere sake of space-saving, and its value in facilitating dissemination and in the consequent local availability of books." Regardless of the form of "massive acquisitions", Clapp reasoned, "its readers should be given the same opportunities for identifying relevant material among them as if they were originals." Clapp clarified the benefit of microfacsimile not just for its savings in cost, i.e., inexpensive reproduction and preservation, but for its "important extension of the bibliographic and physical access which is afforded by immediate availability."

Clapp's vision resolved these competing and overlapping needs of reproduction, preservation and dissemination:

I should like to be able to say that nevermore need a book be thrown away just because its paper deteriorated; that cataloging information in internationally accepted form now accompanies each book wherever it goes; that techniques are now available to reduce enormously the costs of book circulation, or to speed up the provision of material to readers (without losing control of the reference copy) through cheap and rapid copying processes; or that the techniques of telefacsimile have been so adapted to library work that duplication of any but the book most locally can immediately become a thing of the past.

=== Computerization ===
Clapp foresaw that the most effective research library will "make available to its users the informational records of mankind... But since the still-increasing rate of production of informational records will make it even more difficult than now for libraries to acquire and catalog significant portions of the total, other means must be devised." Thus, Clapp considered the "possible application of computer techniques" and that "There can be little doubt that methods will gradually be found for employing computers or computer-like machines in the operations of libraries." For dissemination purposes, Clapp realized, "It should be possible not only to update and to weed this catalog electronically at long distance, but all to consult it electronically from any point in the country."

By extension, Clapp explained, "The spark needed to fire the succession of developments leading to this result is very simple – it is the commencement of the conversion of a great catalog to machine-readable form. Although conditions are not quite ripe for this, they are impending." Using the example of the bibliographic database, MEDLARS, a CLR-funded project that saw breakthroughs in font control, Clapp saw its potential not just in terms of automation and dissemination but for reduction in reliance on expensive books that are quickly outdated, assisting, thereby, the burdensome requirement of a library for "comprehensiveness" in its holdings. Clapp wrote, "Now, though the impracticability of comprehensiveness may thus be acknowledged, yet it would appear that local self-sufficiency should bear some quantitative as well as qualitative relationship to comprehensiveness," thus anticipating the necessity of affordable dissemination. At the same time, Clapp recognized the "not so shiny side" of these new technologies, principally "that dependence upon the resources of a distant library involves so much in the way of formalities, delay, cost and the frustration and indignity of having one's request subordinated protractedly or absolutely to the prior claims of the immediate users of that library."

== Copyright ==
From the time of his roles as Chief Assistant Librarian and Acting Librarian through to his death in 1972, Clapp vigorously promoted, discussed, and published articles on copyright reform, especially as impacted by the developing technologies of photocopy and computerized reproduction of text. Into the 1960s, and response to those developing technologies, the expanding claims of publishing and multi-media companies challenged library purposes and processes regarding duplication, dissemination, preservation and access to copyright materials. Clapp wrote significant articles on these issues defending the interests and needs of librarians, including his 1962 "Library photocopying and copyright: recent developments" and his 1968 "Copyright—A Librarian's View" (prepared for the National Advisory Commission on Libraries) and "The Copyright Dilemma: A Librarian's View". Consistent with Clapp's comprehensive approach to library needs and potential solutions, in "The Copyright Dilemma" Clapp conceptualized the copyright "dilemma" from the librarian's point of view as:

a librarian must now increasingly view copyright as a form of exterior control which threatens serious limitations of his library's freedom to put its collections to work in the service of its users.

He delineated the alternatives for libraries as "(a) to abandon completely the affected services; (b) to dispense with the use of modern technology and to revert to archaic and inefficient methods for providing such services; or (c) to pay in burdensome and discriminatory fees and red tape in order to be permitted to use the more effective methods." Clapp next reviewed the constitutional and statutory purpose of copyright in U.S. law, including Federalist No. 43 ("a brief discussion of this section") and, especially, the Copyright Act of 1909 and its legislative purposes, which Clapp delineated between the constitutional purpose "to promote the progress of Science and Useful Arts" and the public need for access to information. He clarified, "First, how much will the legislation stimulate the producer and so benefit the public; and second, how much will the monopoly granted be detrimental to the public?" Clapp next attached the purpose of copying to the essence of a library in that, "They may also be said to exist for a principal purpose of facilitating further copying," from which he identified those purposes as essentially that of preserving copies.

Clapp's 1962 work focused on the inherent problem for libraries in reliance upon the copyright fair use exception in the common law, since "Fair use has no statutory basis .... [and] since there is no way of predicting what a court might deem absurd, it is impossible to give a satisfactory definition of what constitutes fair use." Clapp explained that the "Gentlemen's Agreement of 1935" (see Robert C. Binkley: Joint Committee and Documentary Reproduction) between librarians book publishers that, while asserting that publishers maintained absolute right over copyright material, provided a liability exemption for "a single photographic reproduction or reduction of a part of a book or periodical volume in lieu of loan or manual transcription, solely for purposes of research." Clapp referenced the 1961 report to the House Judiciary Committee from the Register of Copyrights that called for statutory resolution to the issue. The report reflected Clapp's views on the need for statutory definition of fair use.

By 1968 the issue of fair use was yet unsettled, prompting Clapp's subsequent publications on copyright, which coincided with Congressional hearings on topic. That year, Congress tabled the issue, as it would until 1976. No longer president of the CLR, in 1970 Clapp presented his undiluted views on the issue at the annual Rutgers University Graduate School of Library Service symposium, titled, "Copyright—the Librarian and the Law". The preface states, "This symposium, the eighth in the series, was so successful, productive and meaningful in its content, particularly in light of the existing problems in the area of copyright and copyright legislation, that the School and the Alumni Association decided that it was virtually imperative to publish the complete proceedings of that day's events .... Furthermore, much of the emphasis during the day's discussion was on the subject of photocopying in libraries and on the resultant question of copyright definition with which most librarians are confronted." The symposium and its perceived importance was in light of the ongoing debates in Congress over copyright reform and spoke directly to them.

Charles H. Lieb, counsel to the Association of American Publishers and chairman of the American Bar Association, presented the industry perspective. Lieb argued that the then Senate version of copyright reform would, "for the first time", create statutory fair use as well as statutory exemption from liability for copyright violations for librarians—a significant concession by the industry. However, Lieb argued that statutory limits of fair use must prohibit "photocopying in excess of fair use." Lieb's overall argument, however, came down to the financial burdens of fair use upon the publishing industry. Two other speakers represented the author and "information industry" perspectives. Clapp then presented that of the librarian.

Clapp reviewed the history of copyright law and the present discussion, which was animated by ongoing Congressional debates. Clapp observed, "From the point of view of Congress, which gets its directive in this matter from the Constitution, the copyright monopoly is not merely for the purpose of making money. Its primary purpose, by contrast, is to serve the public interest." Reviewing passage in the House of Representatives of H.R. 2512 in April 1967, Clapp observed that the bill limited photocopying to "archives" (and thus negating other existing fair use exemptions for copying), which resulted in a "clamor from the library world". In response, he said, the Senate adjusted the terms of Section 108 of the bill, which came "close to meeting library needs (But—alas—a miss is as good as a mile!)" The Senate version extended photocopy authorization for libraries to include "replacement copying" and "for service to readers", but, he noted, "There are, of course, a few little conditions", which he listed. "All but two of these conditions are quite acceptable to libraries. Of these, condition d. is crippling but not fatal. But condition e. is fatal." The "fatal" condition e. stated, "The user must establish to the satisfaction of the library that an unused copy cannot be obtained at a normal price from commonly-known trade sources in the United States, including authorized producing services." Clapp explained,

It would send the users of libraries back to the Middle Ages. Compelled to copy out by manual drudgery materials needed for their research parentheses and there is no showing that this is anymore legal than photocopying parentheses. It would kill the vast exchange of interlibrary loans of journal articles which is possible only because libraries can send photo copies in lieu of the bound volumes which they are unwilling to lend on account of costs, risk of damage or loss and deprivation of their use.

Researcher Jonathan Miller produced a study of the impact of research libraries on shaping the Copyright Act of 1976. According to Miller, Clapp's focus on technology and practical use deeply shaped the argument over fair use leading up to its statutory clarification in the Copyright Act. He observes, "Verner Clapp and Ralph Shaw also had a significant impact with their ideas about the changing definition of 'copy' and the distinction between private copying and publishing." Furthermore,

Clapp and McCarthy participated in focused lobbying efforts in which they targeted the members of relevant Congressional committees. The association staff and leaders encouraged members to contact their representatives, especially if those members sat on key committees. Individuals like Verner Clapp produced a series of publications for the professional literature keeping the membership abreast of developments and encouraging them to participate in the effort.

For example, in 1967 Clapp vigorously opposed House Bill 2512, calling it "an industry bill" that would have deep implications upon libraries. Additionally, Clapp was quoted in arguments in the landmark intellectual property case, Williams & Wilkins Co. v. United States. While defending the library industry and its public purposes, as Princeton University Librarian William Dix pointed out, Clapp "recognized the critical importance of copyright reform in the encouragement of scholarship."

== Legacy ==
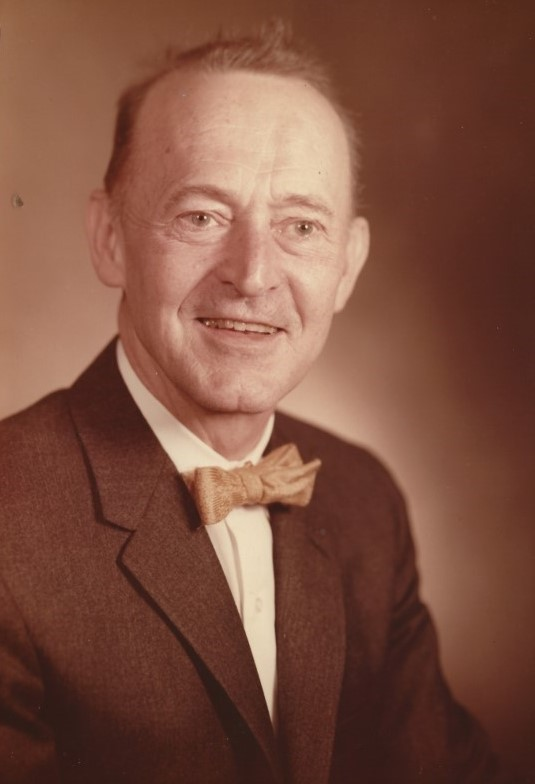
Verner W. Clapp, c. 1960s (personal portrait)

=== "Change agent" ===
In his study of Clapp's contribution to materials preservation, "Verner W. Clapp, as Opinion Leader and Change Agent in the Preservation of Library Materials", William Crowe observed, "Clapp functioned as opinion leader and change agent in one important area of librarianship." Clapp, Crowe concluded, "must be credited with calling attention, articulating and over an extended period, to a long-recognized challenge: assuring the good beginnings of the search for verifiable knowledge about it; and exhorting a diffuse community of interest to act to meet the challenge." As to his legacy in this particular, "Clapp's role as a change agent may thus fairly be judged to have had effect into the early 1980s."

In a 2011 interview, Crowe explained why he selected Clapp as the subject of his dissertation:

"It came out of my exposure at the University of Michigan to Verner Clapp, through the stories of the director, who had known this great man, who had died in 1971, at the Library of Congress in the 1940s and I heard a lot of stories about this man, who had been his mentor. I was very interested in understanding how the burgeoning interest in preservation in the 1970s and early 1980s was [taking] off. Where did this come from? Where might it be going? .... So I did a study of Clapp's life. He died 40 years ago. He was almost all but forgotten. But he had been the number two guy at the Library of Congress, head of the Council on Library Resources, and was the behind the scenes person, I discovered and proved, in most of the major developments in preservation in the 1930s, 40s, 50s and 60s. His fingerprints were in the background on almost everything, which was the substance of my dissertation."

=== Cataloging in Publication ===
In order to address problems of cost, delay and standardization in cataloging new publications, in 1958, along with CLR funding, the Library of Congress launched an experimental program, "cataloging-in-Source", for Library catalogers to log bibliographic data directly onto book proofs before publication. In all, 1200 publications from 157 publishers were cataloged in the experiment. However, the program yielded errors and a tremendous cost of $25 per book, and was dropped after eight months. Nevertheless, after the "cataloging-in-source" project, Clapp wrote that the "demonstration ... extends the prospect of at last realizing—100 years later—the possibilities of providing cataloging information in the very book to which that information refers, envisaged by Charles C. Jewett in the earliest days of American library development".

Clapp had promoted the idea since at least 1950, when he wrote of cataloging-in-source as having "advantages [that] would accrue not only to the thousands of libraries using LC cards, but we believe to the publishers themselves, since their books would be available in libraries on release date or very shortly thereafter, and would not be withheld from the public." As head of the CLR, Clapp continued to promote the concept, which took the form of the 1971 Cataloging in Publication (CIP) trial program, funded by matching grants from the CLR and the Endowment for the Humanities. CIP yielded enormous benefits in bibliographic entry for new publications, especially regarding accuracy of entries and cost. Thomas M. Schmid of the University of Utah reported that the program had reduced cataloguing costs for his library from $5.80 per title to $0.75, rendering an annual savings of up to $15,000, which he anticipated would increase "as more publishers are brought into the program". CIP became a fully-funded program at the Library of Congress in 1973. According to the Library, as of 2021 the program has "created more than 2 million CIP data records".

In a 2001 historical review of the CIP program, Librarian Charles Fenly credits Clapp's essential role in the development of CIP. Fenly points to a report that William J. Walsh of the Library and Clapp jointly prepared that served as a "'new look' at CIS, to be renamed cataloging-in-publication, or CIP" and which convinced Librarian Mumford to go forward with the program. Glen A. Zimmerman, who at the time was Acting Chief of the Descriptive Cataloging Division, which implemented the CIP project, reported that Clapp was "a staunch CIP supporter; he used his LC experience and management skills to further the CIP efforts". And William A. Gosling, an early CIP Program Manager, noted that Clapp's contribution was essential to the program's success, as "The idea [was] conceived and kept alive by Verner Clapp, who had been an advocate for Cataloging-in-Source, CIP's prototype..." and that Clapp had, along with publishing industry leaders and other librarians, "all worked diligently to shape the program and secure early publisher buy-in". Integration of CIP with MARC advanced digitization and electronic sharing of the data, including online entry starting in 1987 and in 1993 online transmission directly to publishers. Additionally, CIP's impact extended beyond the U.S. library and publishing industries, as it set an international example and standard adopted by other countries, including Australia, Brazil, Canada, the former Soviet Union, and the United Kingdom.

=== Computerization and digital dissemination of records ===
Clapp did not singularly nor specifically predict the digital revolution, however, as advocate, organizer, and thinker, Clapp's most significant contribution to the digital revolution was to articulate the needs of libraries and who, how, and for what they serve, and to identify both in process and concept possible solutions for meeting those needs and goals.

While Clapp's 1964 The Future of the Research Library, and subsequent talks and articles up to his death in 1972, articulated his cumulative professional assessment of the present and future of library technologies, it was the product of the vision he had developed over his entire career. Having worked his way from the Main Reading Room, assisting patrons to retrieve Library holdings, to administrative responsibilities for building, maintaining, and disseminating them, Clapp's understanding of a library came down to two core functions, which he expressed in 1955 as "organization", or bibliographic functions, defined as "all the activities whereby all the source of information is identified", and "access", or records handling, defined as "the activities relating to their publication and distribution". The library profession recognized potential technological solutions for bibliographic functions, or "organization", as Clapp called it, via computerization and other methods of sharing and disseminating bibliographic records.

But few, if any, librarians appreciated that the same could be accomplished for viewing of the records themselves, i.e., "access". In 1955, while still Chief Assistant Librarian, Clapp published an article, "Implications for Documentation and the Organization of Knowledge", that outlined the implications of the dual challenges of "organization" and "access" for libraries as a whole and not, as was understood at the time, as implicating individual libraries:

There will come a time—earlier or later in proportion to the effectiveness and economy of the needed technical developments—when it will be cheaper to get a book from a thousand miles away, by telefacsimile perhaps, than to go and fetch it from an inaccessible stackroom. At this point the great collections (I am speaking of the collections of published works) will begin to weed, without loss of accessibility, just as collections with lower ambitions have done long since. Indeed, this process has already begun.

In other words, Clapp understood that individual libraries were incapable of keeping pace with the exponential growth in materials and that existing solutions for sharing and dissemination were impractical. Thus, as early as 1955 Clapp had envisioned the digital information world of the 21st century, in which materials storage is permanent and access to them instantaneous from anywhere in the world:

Under these circumstances [of limitations upon "organization" and "access"] I shall not dwell upon my favorite solution for the problem—and it is a primary problem—of access. This is to seal one copy of everything in concrete in a big hole in Kentucky. Next to each copy would be sealed a scanning device. To consult the item, the user would merely dial the appropriate number, and the item would be shown on his television screen. Simple controls would enable him to flip the pages; and, of course, any number of persons could consult the same item simultaneously! Perhaps this idea is not so extravagant as it sounds, especially since we already have three of the components -the books, the television screens, and the big hole in Kentucky. Shouldn't we ask the engineers to go on from there?

Starting with his experience in delivering books stored locally to patrons at the Main Reading Room, Clapp essentially envisioned not just the concept of a computerized world, an idea that not unique to him, but its practical import to individual access to information.

=== Copyright ===
Clapp foresaw the confluence and conflicts between copying technology and copyright and promoted codification of expanded fair use provisions. His efforts at the organizational level, direct lobbying, and publications were deeply influential in shaping the debate within the library community and in Congress. While fair use in statutory law did not resolve the divide between copyright holders and libraries, it settled their disputes and clarified the rules regarding them. Most importantly, as Clapp plainly foresaw, it created the terms for addressing the challenges on copyright created by the digital revolution. In the 1968 report to the National Commission on Libraries, Clapp advised, "It is recommended that a full study of copying, not just of photocopying, be assigned, if not to the commission, then to some other body with assurance that it be dealt with, not simply as a question to be arbitrated between adversaries, but as an important question of public policy." Just as presciently, Clapp pointed to the utility of copying for "preservation" and "performance", key elements of modern multimedia copyright use.

=== Library integration ===
Clapp's contemporaries lauded his role shaping various areas of librarianship. In her 1965 article in The Library Quarterly on the Library Technology Project, Gladys Piez observed that whatever the accomplishments of the Project, "Clapp's prestige in the library world has opened doors which might otherwise have been at least partly closed to the project. It has certainly made the way easier." Regarding Clapp's work on collaboration and sharing of resources, Haltsein wrote, "It seems Clapp foresaw the possibilities of networking and the necessity for strong regional and local systems before such terms were even fashionable, let alone discussed seriously."

=== Controversies ===
As a government and industry insider, Clapp contributed to or was directly responsible for many public policy and library industry decisions, some of which have been contemporaneously or subsequently criticized. During the 1960s and 1970s, the publishing industry attacked Clapp for his promotion of library copying and the fair use doctrine. During the Loyalty program episodes, Clapp was forced to walk a thin line between public policy, library industry politics, and his personal and interpersonal relations and beliefs. In the controversial book Double Fold, writer Nicholson Baker accused Clapp of significant contribution to destruction of original materials, especially newspapers, upon microfilming pages, which, Baker claims, has destroyed those original materials while creating possibly incomplete or corrupted microfilm copies of them. Baker claims that decisions to destroy the original materials were made the result of librarians who "lied shamelessly" about their condition.

As observed by contemporaries and subsequent scholarship, Clapp's legacy in these, as in other, episodes, characteristically, was to seek moderation, cooperation, and consent.

=== General influence ===
Overall, and beyond his specific accomplishments, Clapp influenced librarianship generally, guiding the profession towards practical applications and solutions. His contemporaries described his indefatigable effort and entrenched optimism. After compiling a substantial list of advances and new technologies, Clapp advised the ALA, "No; no millennia can be announced at this time. A number of good advances have been made, and others impend. To describe them must be the task of another report." Frederick Wagman concluded of Clapp that, "Of all his memorable traits, however, the one that was most characteristic of Verner was his enthusiasm ... Verner had it in full measure."

== Personal life ==
In 1929, Clapp married Dorothy Devereaux Ladd, who worked as an assistant book buyer at Woodward & Lothrop. In 1936, the couple moved to Chevy Chase, Maryland and there raised three children, Nancy, Verner and Judith. Clapp published a volume on his wife's family genealogy and relished summers at the family camp in Maine, where he pursued his childhood fascination, along with his father, and, subsequently, his children and grandchildren, with geology, nature, and the outdoors.

Whatever Clapp took on he took on fully. Washington Evening Star journalist Mary McGrory wrote, "Practically everyone [at the Library] has memories of Mr. Clapp spiritedly dashing down the corridor in search of a subordinate" and, regarding his departure from the institution, "The Library of Congress is a sadder, sedater places these days, Verner Clapp, the Chief Assistant Librarian has departed and Government has lost its most bubbling bureaucrat, and the Library, its yeastiest official. Mr. Clapp, puckish of face, unquenchable of spirit, left last month... His going from the Library which has known him, man and boy for 33 years, left every-one from Librarian Quincy Mumford down to the stackboys feeling bereft." King Features Syndicate columnist George Dixon wrote playfully of Clapp, "Contrary to popular report, Verner Clapp is a man -– a prodigy, a plymath [sic], perhaps -– but for the time being, happily mortal and endowed with unmistakably human eccentricities. Witness, for example, his habit of writing on tramways, confident in jostled legibility; his uncontrollable passion for vaulting over barricadoes [sic]; his experiments with vinification."

Princeton Librarian William Dix described Clapp as "a serious man in the sense that whatever engaged his attention – and what did not? – involved him fully and even passionately". Lee Grove recalled that while waiting on delivery of his first child, Nancy, Clapp read Ludwig Hain's "Repoertorium, that standard bibliography of incunabula". A biographic entry for Clapp notes, "He was the author of over 200 monographs and articles; he enjoyed book-binding, playing the flute, working with wood, sketching, writing poems, inventing devices to assist the library user, building a cupola – he was a true Renaissance man!"

On Clapp's departure from the Library, David Mearns wrote to the staff, "Aside from the loss of his outstanding contributions to the Library of Congress, there is a personal loss of that uncommon individual, Verner Clapp. He is that singular man whose mind never grows stale or fails to find fresh stimulation in the work of the day; always accessible, always willing to devote himself to the problems of colleagues, he has an extraordinary gift for infusing others with his enthusiasm and imagination... We are not only better librarians – we are better human beings because of this journey."

== Awards and honors ==
- 1954: Verner W. Clapp Publication Fund, Library of Congress, for "issuing facsimiles of historic and rare materials in the Library of Congress", established.
- 1957: Honorary Member, District of Columbia Library Association.
- 1960: Joseph W. Lippincott Award for "distinguished service to the profession of librarianship", American Library Association.
- 1967: American Library Association Honorary Membership, the ALA's highest award.
- 1968: Order of the Sacred Treasure, Gold and Silver Star (Kun-Nito Zuihosho), conferred to Clapp by the government of Japan.
- 1972: "The Librarian's Librarian", Special Citation from the Special Libraries Association.
- 1973: The Clapp Collection, Japanese National Diet Library, established.
- 1973: Verner W. Clapp papers, Library of Congress, established.
- undated: Verner Clapp Distinguished Research Fellowship, Council on Library and Information Resources

== Publications ==
- For a full bibliography of Clapp's publications, see Verner Warren Clapp, 1901–1972: a memorial tribute
- 1937. The Constitution of the United States; an account of its travels since September 17, 1787, with David Chambers Mearns. U.S. Government Printing Office (1937).
- 1950. Library of Congress Bibliographical Survey: A Report Prepared for Unesco (1950).
- 1953. Current trends in libraries of the United States government Editors: Verner W. Clapp and Scott Adams (1953).
- 1955 Implications for Documentation and the Organization of Knowledge, The Library Quarterly, Vol 25, No. 4 (Oct 1955).
- 1958. The University library and the wise man: addresses by Theodore R. McKeldin and Verner W. Clapp (1958).
- 1960. "'To assist in solving the problems of libraries': The program of the Council on Library Resources", ALA Bulletin, American Library Association, Vol 54, No.3 (March 1960).
- 1962. The United Nations Library, 1945–1961, Libri, Vol. 12 (1962).
- 1962. "Library Photocopying and Copyright: recent developments", Law Library Journal, Vol. 55 (Feb 1962).
- 1964. The Future of the Research Library, University of Illinois Press (1964).
- 1968. "Copyright: A Librarian's View" Washington, Copyright Committee, Association of Research Libraries (1968).
- 1968. "The Copyright Dilemma: A Librarian's View" Library Quarterly, Vol 38 (Oct. 1968).
- 1971. "The Declaration of Independence: a case study in preservation", Special Libraries Vol. 62, issue 12. (December 1971).
- 1971. The Story of Permanent /Durable Book-Paper 1115–1970, Scholarly Publishing (1971), reprinted by Restaurator Press, (1972).
- 1971. "The Greatest Invention Since the Title-Page?", Wilson Library Bulletin, Vol 46 (Dec 1971).
