= Vittorino Veronese =

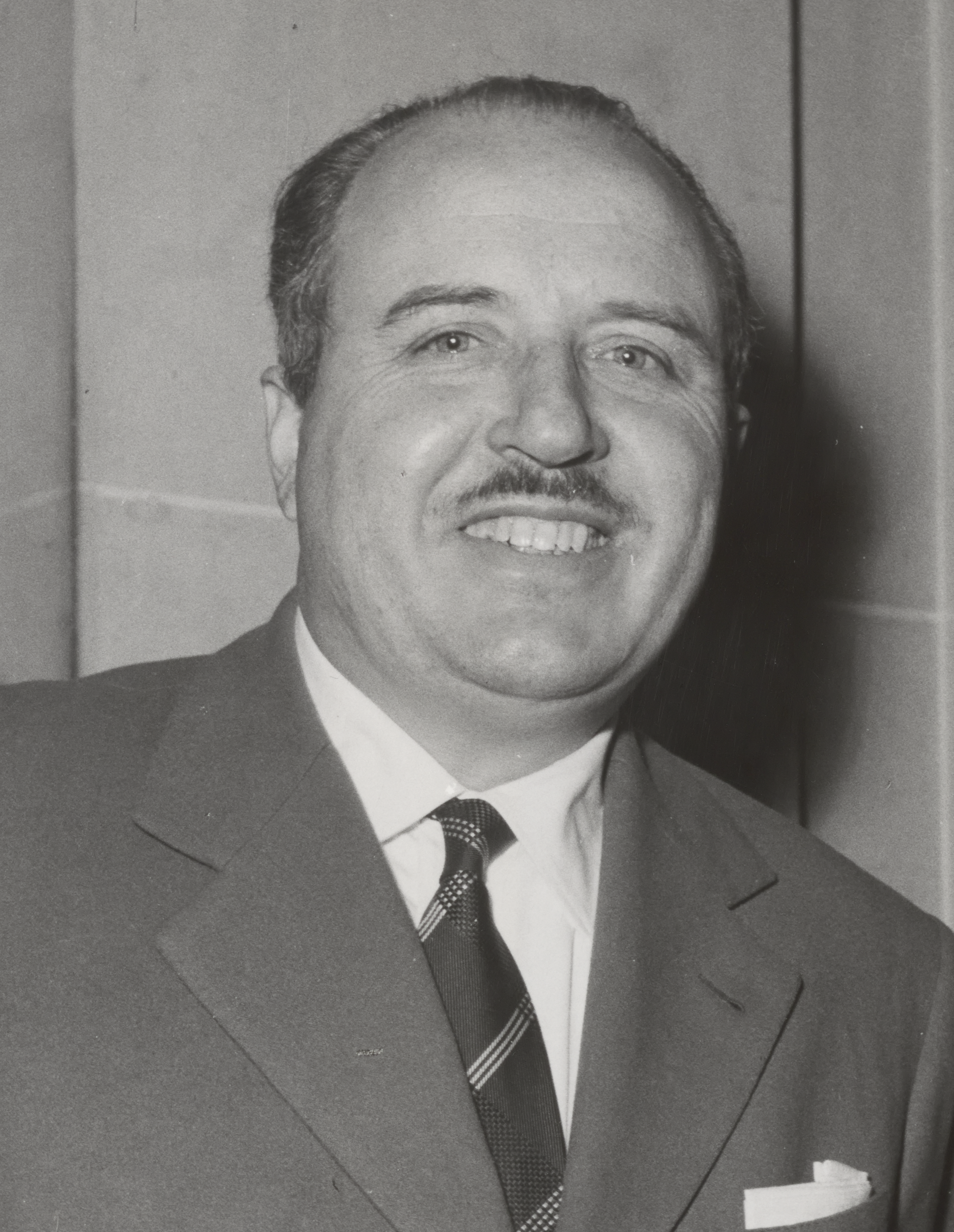
- Veronese in 1957

4th Director-General of UNESCO
- In office 1958–1961
- Preceded by: Luther Evans
- Succeeded by: René Maheu

Personal details
- Born: 1 January 1910 Vicenza, Italy
- Died: 3 September 1986 (aged 76)
- Citizenship: Italy
- Education: University of Padua

Vittorino Veronese (1 March 1910 – 3 September 1986) was an Italian anti-fascist lawyer and activist who served as UNESCO’s Director-General from 1958 to 1961. Before his appointment as UNESCO’s Director-General he served as Chairman of the Catholic Institute for Social Activity and of Azione Cattolica. From 1952 to 1956 he served on UNESCO’s board and was UNESCO’s chairperson from 1956 to 1958. Three years after the appointment as the Director-General, Veronese had to resign due to health concerns.

Veronese would continue to hold roles within the Catholic Church after his career with UNESCO, and to be prominent in the international sphere until his death in 1986 at the age of 76.

== Early life and career ==
Vittorino Veronese was born in a country town near Venice, Vicenza on 1 March 1910. His father worked in a local electric plant as a chief technician, and his mother was a school teacher.

Young Vittorino Veronese started school early and advanced with his scholastic peers. He was not proficient in sports, but would cite a passion for music later in life.

Veronese graduated from the University of Padua with a doctoral degree in law before he reached twenty-one. His thesis was about the right of Vatican citizenship. He worked as a lawyer for ten years after graduation, then started to pursue a career in the fields of sociology and education. He became a sociology instructor at the Institute of Social Sciences at Ateneo Angelicum University in Rome.

During the war years, he worked together with democratically-minded scholars and directed a review, named “Studium”. He became the editor of the review in a later year.

Veronese was a captain for a time in the infantry reserve and discharged during the war because of his suffering from arthritis. He served as a high officer during his twenties in the Catholic Movement of University Graduates and he was close with the Vatican-including activism there.

Veronese did not participate in the Fascist movement under the rule of Mussolini. During the early interwar period, he supported the rule of Giovanni Battista Montini, the future Paul VI. In 1939, at the age of twenty-nine, Veronese was invited by Montini to Rome and appointed to the position of general secretaryship of the Movimento Laureati (Catholic University Graduates’ Association) affiliated with Italia Catholic Action. His work mission was to expel Communists out of the postwar governments. The same year, he married Maria Petrarca, with whom he had seven children: Marialaura, Francesca, Paolo, Gianluca, Alberto, Lucia, and Pietro.

Between 1944 and 1946, he participated in the establishment of the Associazione Cattolica Lavoratori Italiani (ACLI), Italy's future Catholic trade union association.

After 1944 and the collapse of fascism in Italy, Veronese was appointed the first lay President of Italian Catholic Action. In this capacity he would go on to hold many other prominent roles, including member of the Governing Board of the Foundation “Premi Roma” for youth, President of the Association of Refugee Intellectual in Italy, President of the Italian Central Institute of Credit, President of the “Consorzio di Credito per le Opere Pubbliche” and member of the executive committee of the Italian African Institute.

Vittorino Veronese would later be removed as President of Italian Catholic Action in 1952 by Pope Pius XII in favour of Luigi Gedda.

== UNESCO ==
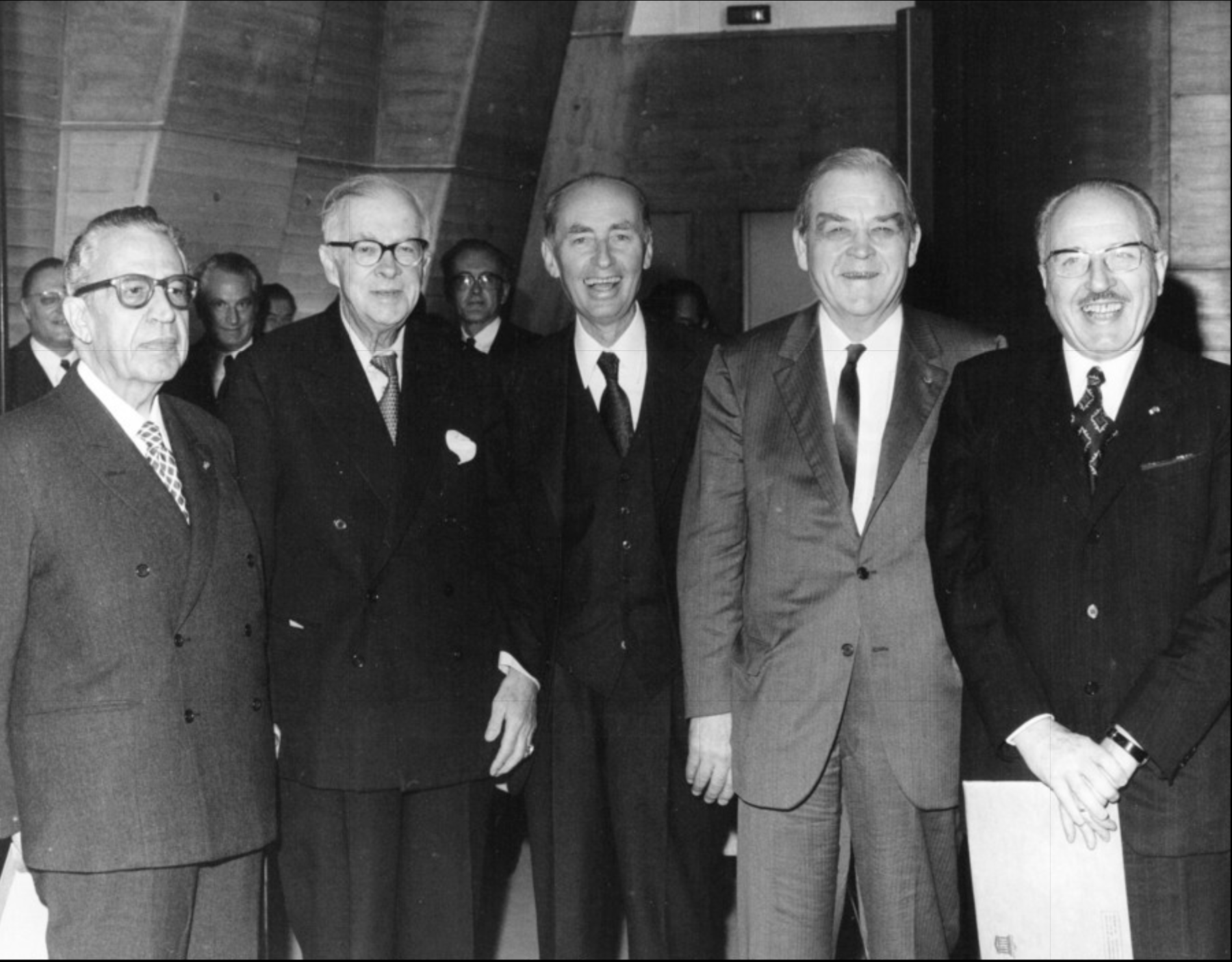
Celebration of UNESCO's 25th anniversary. Left to right, five Directors-General of the UNESCO, Jaime Torres Bodet (Mexico, 1948–1952), Julien Huxley (Royaume Uni,1946-1948), René Maheu (France,1961-), Luther Evans (USA, 1953–1958), Vittorino Veronese (Italie, 1958–1961).

As a well-known member the Italian Movement of Catholic graduates and Catholic Action, Veronese became active participant in the work of UNESCO after 1948. From 1952 to 1956 he served as a representative on UNESCO's executive board, and was elected as the board's chairperson between 1956 and 1958. He continued to hold this role until his appointment as UNESCO Director-General. He advocated for the importance of self-determination without discrimination in education as well as the importance of its inclusion of linkages to daily life. Veronese believed that education went along with the benefits of industrialization. As a UNESCO Director-General, Vittorino Veronese would lead member nations to sign the Paris Convention against Discrimination in Education in 1960.

Also in 1960, 19 newly independent African nations (including Burkina Faso, Chad, Gambia, and Nigeria) were granted membership. Special emphasis was placed on the “elimination of illiteracy” within the new African member nations, which resulted in the Addis Ababa Conference of African Ministers of Education, held May 15–25 of 1961. This was the first educational conference held by African leaders where the focus was determined by member nations and general concerns of middle Africa. From 1960, Veronese led the start of the International Campaign to Save the Monuments of Nubia.

Vittorino Veronese followed the socio-cultural lead of predecessor Luther H. Evans and inaugurated Evans’ proposed “Special Fund” for extra-budgetary collection to support the launch of 37 teacher training programs in developing countries. This allowed for the later progress of UNESCO with the support of the UNDP and UNICEF across the 60 members.

After his work cementing this conference within development history, his term as the head of this committee continued until the beginning of his presidency at the Banco di Roma in 1961.

== Later life ==
Veronese resigned from the position of Director-General of UNESCO in 1961 and returned to Rome, which he cited as being due to illnesses. Veronese served as the head of the Banco di Roma until he retired in 1976. Even after his retirement, in the last ten years of his life, Veronese continued to volunteer in charitable initiatives and the international peace movement until his death in 1986.

Veronese was also involved in the creation of the Second Vatican Council in 1963, together with Frenchman Jean Guitton. Veronese was invited to address the council at St. Peter's in support of “movement toward ecunism and the expanding role of laypeople in the Church” . Veronese was initially competing for the lay auditor position to the Second Vatican Council with Guitton, debating back and forth to decide which one of them should have the honor. Their speeches were regarded as “Attestations of Reverence” by the Roman Curia: “The Italian spoke simply and briefly; M. Guitton was more rhetorical”.

Following the council Veronese became a consultor to the secretariat of Nonbelievers. In LIFE magazine June 21, 1963 issue, Veronese was cited of his opinion on the selection of the new Pope due to his history being involved in Italian Catholic Association and his closeness to Montini, who will later take on the name Paul VI as Pope from 1963 to 1978. Veronese stated “for the first time, the Church is attempting to make a bridge between itself and the world. Now we can see that the Church and the world have the same frontiers”. In 1967 he was a member of the Pontifical Commission for Justice and Peace, in which he chaired the study Committee for the Problems of Peace and the International Community. In March 1972 he was appointed a member of the College of Lawyers of the Sacred Consistory.

In 1967, Veronese was awarded an honorary doctorate in law by Université Laval in Quebec.

Government offices
Preceded by Luther Evans	Director-General of UNESCO; 1958–1961	Succeeded by René Maheu
