= Luther H. Evans =

10th Librarian of the US Congress (1902–1981)

Luther Evans

3rd Director-General of UNESCO
- In office 1953–1958
- Secretary General: Dag Hammarskjöld
- Preceded by: John Taylor (acting)
- Succeeded by: Vittorino Veronese

Librarian of Congress
- In office December 19, 1944 – July 5, 1953; Acting: December 19, 1944 – June 29, 1945
- President: Harry S. Truman; Dwight D. Eisenhower
- Preceded by: Archibald MacLeish
- Succeeded by: Verner W. Clapp (acting)

Personal details
- Born: Luther Harris Evans; October 13, 1902 Sayersville, Texas, U.S.
- Died: December 23, 1981 (aged 79) San Antonio, Texas, U.S.
- Education: University of Texas, Austin (BA, MA); Stanford University (PhD)

Academic background
- Thesis: The Mandates System and the Administration of Territories under C Mandate (1927)

Academic work
- Discipline: Political science
- Institutions: New York University; Dartmouth College; Princeton University

Luther Harris Evans (13 October 1902 – 23 December 1981) was an American political scientist who served as the tenth Librarian of Congress and third Director-General of UNESCO.

== Early life and career ==
Born in Sayersville in Bastrop County, Texas in 1902, Evans received his BA in 1923 and MA in 1924 from the University of Texas at Austin and his PhD from Stanford University in 1927, all in political science.

He taught political science at New York University, Dartmouth College, and Princeton University from 1927 until 1935. Evans left Princeton University abruptly after a faculty dispute.

== Government service ==
Friends referred him for help to the powerful Lehman family of New York, who got him an appointment with Harry Hopkins, the advisor to Franklin Delano Roosevelt. At a meeting in the White House, Hopkins asked the young professor to propose a plan for a project Hopkins already wanted to do. Evans went back the next day and told Hopkins that the project wasn't worth doing. Instead, he pointed out that the States Archives of the United States were in a state of disarray with profound consequences to American history. Hopkins said, "Dr. Evans, you have a lot of guts—I know you have no money and that your wife is nine months pregnant, and I have never thought about the state archives. But I hear that you have a good reputation." This is how Evans came to organize and direct the Historical Records Survey for the Works Project Administration from 1935 to 1939. Evans was later commended for successfully navigating the "frequently heated political environment of Harry Hopkins' WPA" despite his relative youth and inexperience.

== Librarian of Congress ==
After this, he was appointed by Librarian of Congress, Archibald MacLeish, as head of the Legislative Reference Service and later Chief Assistant Librarian of Congress. After MacLeish resigned, president Harry S. Truman appointed Evans as Librarian of Congress, a position he held from 1945 to 1953. During his tenure, Evans opposed censorship of the library's holdings, and greatly expanded the library's collection.

Well versed in international relations, Evans also returned a number of manuscripts to their countries of origin. He helped draft the Universal Copyright Convention at Geneva in 1952.

During McCarthyism, Evans voluntarily instituted the Federal Loyalty Program at the Library of Congress, placing Verner Clapp in charge of a loyalty board to examine current and potential employees regarding communism and homosexuality. This program resulted in numerous employees being fired or resigning for their political or sexual orientation, and William Carlos Williams was prevented from being appointed to the post of United States Poet Laureate. Evans told Karl Shapiro "we don't want any Communists or cocksuckers in this library."

The Library of Congress exhibit, "Freedom's Fortress," covers the tenure of MacLeish and Evans: 1939–1953 during World War II and the founding of UNESCO.

== UNESCO ==
In 1953 Evans resigned from the Library of Congress to accept a position as UNESCO's third Director-General, the only American to hold this post.

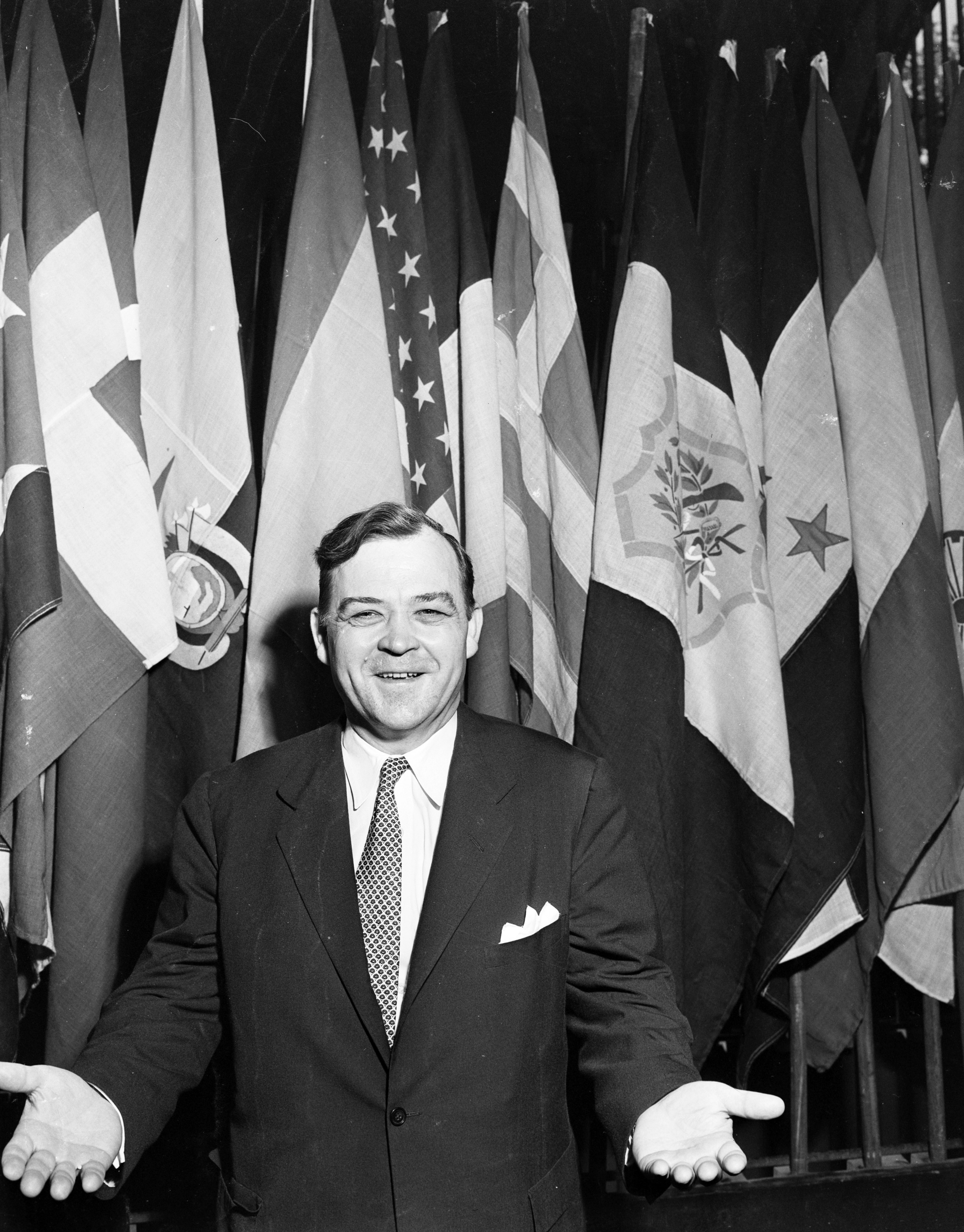
Dr. Luther Evans Nominated Director General of UNESCO

Evans fired seven UNESCO employees who were US citizens because they refused to submit to a US government loyalty investigation.

Evans was active in international peace issues throughout his life, serving in many capacities with educational organizations and commissions. He served as President of the United World Federalists in 1970–1976, and his thinking of this period is seen in his testimony before the Committee on Foreign Affairs in the U.S. House of Representatives on February 4, 1975, concerning "The United Nations in the 1970s: Recommendations for U.S. Policy". Working with a range of other Americans prominent in foreign policy, including Father Theodore Hesburgh of Notre Dame, Norman Cousins of Saturday Review, James Grant of the Overseas Development Council, anthropologist Margaret Mead, World Federalist Chairman H. Donald Wilson, and World Bank president Robert McNamara. Evans organized an organization called New Directions. New Directions was to be a U.S. citizen's lobby on international issues modeled on Common Cause. It worked for a time, and helped pass the Panama Canal Treaty, but was ultimately unable to find enough funds to sustain it for the long term.

== Later life ==
From 1962, he was director of international and legal collections at the Columbia University Libraries until his retirement in 1971.

In 1972 Evans was awarded American Library Association Honorary Membership.

He died in 1981 in San Antonio, Texas, aged 79. He was unusual for his generation of Texans because he spoke several languages fluently. He was a renowned story teller who, like his contemporary Lyndon Baines Johnson, used humor to defuse tense political situations in long meetings and build consensus.

His nephew, Jim Evans, was an American League baseball umpire from 1972 through 1999.

== Selected publications ==
- Evans, Luther H., "Are 'C' Mandates Veiled Annexations?" The Southwestern Political and Social Science Quarterly 7, no. 4 (1927): 381–400.
- Evans, Luther H., "New Guinea Under Australian Mandate Rule." The Southwestern Political and Social Science Quarterly 10.1 (1929): 1–21.
- Evans, Luther H., "The General Principles Governing the Termination of a Mandate." The American Journal of International Law 26.4 (1932): 735–58.
- Evans, Luther H., "International Affairs: The Japanese Mandate Naval Base Question." The American Political Science Review 29.3 (1935): 482–87
- Evans, Luther H., "History and the Problem of Bibliography." College & Research Libraries 7.3 (1946): 195–205.
- Evans, Luther H., "The Library of Congress and Its Service to Science and Technology." College & Research Libraries 8.3 (1947): 315–21.
- Evans, Luther H., "National Bibliography and Bibliographical Control: A Symposium." College & Research Libraries 9.2 (1948): 155–56
- Evans, Luther H., "The Magnificent Purpose." Phylon (1940) 10.4 (1949): 314–22.
- Evans, Luther H., "UNESCO in Africa." The American behavioral scientist (Beverly Hills) 5.8 (1962): 25–27.
- Evans, Luther H., "The Challenge of Automation to Education." The American Behavioral Scientist (Beverly Hills) 6.3 (1962): 16–19.
- Evans, Luther H., "Traditional Methods of Organizing and Storing Information." American Documentation 19.3 (1968): 271–72.
- Evans, LH, and Vambery, JT. "Documents and Publications of Contemporary International Governmental Organizations." Law Library Journal 64, no. 3 (1971): 338–62.

Government offices
Preceded by Archibald MacLeish	Librarian of Congress; 1944–1953; Acting: 1944–1945	Succeeded by Verner W. Clapp; Acting
Diplomatic posts
Preceded by John Taylor; Acting	Director-General of UNESCO; 1953–1958	Succeeded by Vittorino Veronese
