= René Maheu =

French professor of philosophy and Director-General of UNESCO (1905–1975)

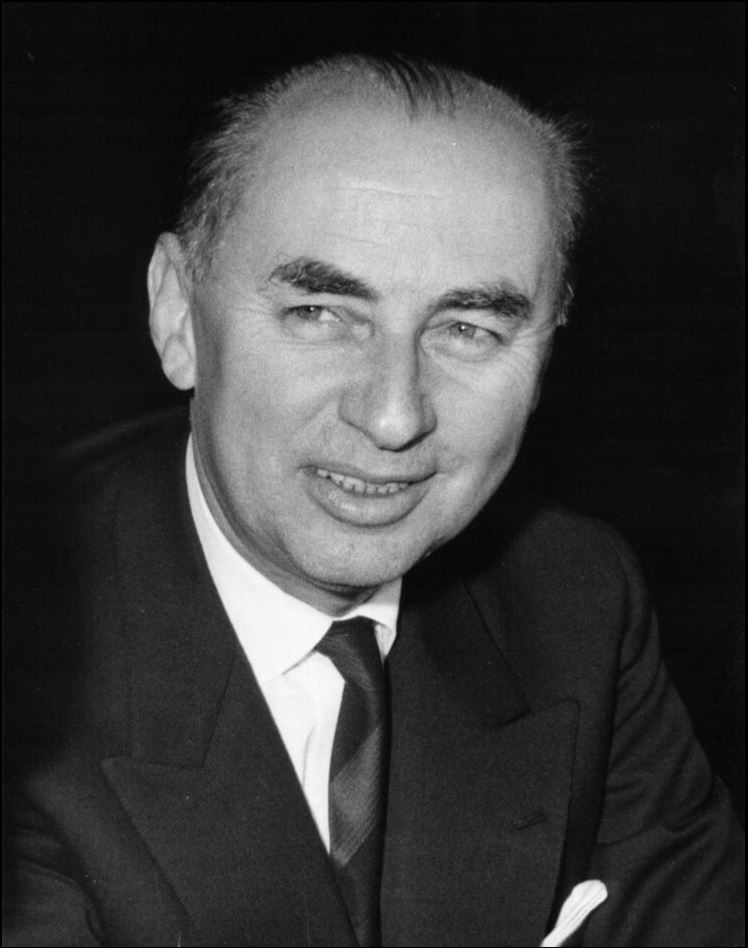
- Maheu in 1962

5th Director-General of UNESCO
- In office 1961–1974
- Preceded by: Vittorino Veronese
- Succeeded by: Amadou-Mahtar M'Bow

Personal details
- Born: March 28, 1905 Saint-Gaudens, France
- Died: December 19, 1975 (aged 70) Paris, France
- Occupation: Philosopher, civil servant

René Gabriel Eugene Maheu (March 28, 1905 – December 19, 1975) was a French professor of philosophy and the 5th Director-General of UNESCO. He was a close friend of Jean-Paul Sartre and Simone de Beauvoir.

He was head of the French Information Office in London (1936–1939) and after teaching in Morocco (1940–1942) during World War II, he occupied a managerial post in the France-Afrique press agency in Algiers, before joining the Executive Office of the Resident-General in Rabat. In 1946 he entered UNESCO as Chief, Division of Free Flow of Information. In 1949 Jaime Torres Bodet appointed him Director of his Executive Office. In 1954 he became Assistant Director-General and was UNESCO's representative at UN Headquarters from 1955 to 1958. He was promoted to Deputy Director-General in 1959, Acting Director-General in 1961, and in 1962–1974 Director-General, for two successive mandates.

Government offices
Preceded by Vittorino Veronese	Director-General of UNESCO; 1961 – 1974	Succeeded by Amadou-Mahtar M'Bow
