= Cataloging in Publication =

Basic cataloging data for a work

In publishing and library science, Cataloging in Publication (CIP, or Cataloguing in Publication) data are basic cataloging data for a work, prepared before publication by the national library of the country where the work is principally published or by the library of a publishing organisation, such as a government department. The name reflects the usual practice of including that information in the corresponding publication—in the case of books, on the copyright page, where it can be useful for cataloguers when they are adding such items to their collections. The national libraries' CIP staffs restrict the range of publications that CIP will be prepared for, for instance requiring access to assistance from the publisher's staff.

A frequent problem with CIP occurs when publishers change bibliographic details, such as the wording of a title, after receiving the CIP data. The CIP data as published in the item will be incorrect and useless to subsequent cataloguing agencies without manual amendment; if a pre-publication record has been entered onto a database, it can be difficult to locate and edit to match the details on the item itself.

Each national library maintains a database of the entries it writes. (Not all nations have a national library or anything comparable.)

In the United States, the Cataloging in Publication Program (CIP) was established by the Library of Congress in 1971, and has since developed in various ways.
