= Sayersville, Texas =

- Unincorporated community
- Location within Texas Location within the United States
- Coordinates: 30°13′55″N 97°19′38″W
- Country: United States
- State: Texas
- County: Bastrop
- Elevation: 413 ft (126 m)
- Time zone: UTC-6 (Central (CST))
  - Summer (DST): UTC-5 (CDT)
- Area codes: 512 & 737
- GNIS feature ID: 1346746

Sayersville is an unincorporated community in Bastrop County, Texas, United States. It is located within the Greater Austin metropolitan area.

== History ==
The community's original name, Sayers, was changed to Sayersville because there is already a community with this name in Bexar County. Its historical association has been publishing a quarterly bulletin since 1982.

== Geography ==
Sayersville is located near the east bank of the Big Sandy Creek, one mile west of Texas State Highway 95 and 7 mi (11 km) north of Bastrop in north-central Bastrop County.

== Education ==
Sayersville had its own school sometime between 1911 and 1916. Today, Sayersville is served by the Elgin Independent School District and Bastrop Independent School District.
