= Arthur Lessac =

American vocal coach

- Born: September 9, 1909; Haifa, Ottoman Palestine
- Died: April 7, 2011 (aged 101); Los Angeles, California, U.S.
- Occupation: vocal coach

Arthur Lessac (September 9, 1909 – April 7, 2011) was the creator of Lessac Kinesensic Training for the voice and body. Lessac's voice text teaches the “feeling process” for discovering vocal sensation in the body for developing tonal clarity, articulation, and for better connecting to text and the rhythms of speech.

== Development of ideas ==
He first studied voice as a student on scholarship at the Eastman School of Music where he graduated in 1936. Lessac's big break into the professional performance scene occurred with Pins and Needles in 1937, a production written and performed by members in the cultural program of the International Ladies Garment Workers’ Union (ILGWU). Lessac taught his ideas of feeling sensation to the amateur performers and helped them develop their voices and bodies. Lessac's next Broadway job came in 1939 with a group of European refugees needing accent elimination for their show From Vienna. Lessac taught the cast how to feel and enjoy the sensations of the consonants. When the show opened, famed critic Brooks Atkinson wrote the cast spoke better English than those for whom English is their native language.

Lessac pursued his interest in health and wellness with voice and movement and gained a Bachelor of Arts degree in Voice-Speech Clinical Therapy from New York University in 1941. Four years later he founded the National Academy of Vocal Arts (NAVA) and taught there until 1950. He further developed the feeling process of voice and movement studies with his 21 teachers. In 1951 he continued discovering the benefits of his work when he taught voice in the Stella Adler Theatre Studio for one year, furthering his explorations of voice and movement for actors. In the same year Lessac began his 20-year tenure with the Jewish Theological Seminary of America. Lessac was in charge of teaching the students seeking ordination how to deliver sermons with good speech, voice and enthusiasm. Instead of simply reading the sermons from the weekly scrolls, Lessac taught them how to commune with the text and inspire their audiences through their vocal delivery.

Several important events happened during his time with the Jewish Theological Seminary. First, Lessac earned a Master of Arts degree in Voice-Speech Clinical Therapy from New York University in 1953 and worked with speech therapy patients at Bellevue Hospital throughout the 1950s. Lessac continued his studies in neurology and anatomy as he helped patients regain sensation in their faces and mouths through vocal explorations. Lessac helped patients with a myriad of afflictions ranging from stuttering to gaining mobility in parts of the face lacking nerve action due to Bell's Palsy. Lessac's work on employing the spirit toward the benefit of a healthy voice developed. By focusing on what a patient could do (and not focusing on disability or lack), patients became empowered in their abilities, engaged their spirits in therapy. Moreover, Lessac's work reiterated the importance of allowing the pleasure of feeling vocal vibration or body's energy guide one towards optimal expression and wellness.

== Professional development ==
Lessac's work with actors changed with the publication of his book in 1960. Famed directors Elia Kazan and Robert Whitehead appointed Lessac as teacher of voice, speech, singing and dialects for their historic repertory company at the Lincoln Center in 1962. Here Lessac worked with two of the top teachers in acting and dance, Robert Lewis and Anna Sokolow. Although the company only lasted one season, working with the most respected theatre professionals at the time reveals how much of an impact his work made on the theatre community.

In the summer of 1969, the theatre program at the State University of New York (SUNY) in Binghamton hired Lessac as full professor with immediate tenure with the mandate to develop the undergraduate and MFA acting program. The summer after his first year, he began teaching intensive workshops over 8 weeks that included all the tenets of his voice and body work. The intensives continue today each summer over 4 weeks and are taught by his master teachers of the work. Lessac left SUNY in 1981 as Professor Emeritus, but continued teaching in training programs all over the United States, Puerto Rico (where one of his students was Adrian Garcia), Germany, Yugoslavia, South Africa, and Mexico. Lessac's teachers and disciples felt the urgency of maintaining the pedagogical practices of the work plus the desire to expand kinesensic research into new terrain. They founded the Lessac Institute in 1998 and developed an examination for teaching certification in 2000. The Lessac Institute now has dozens of certified trainers in sixteen states as well as trainers in South Africa, Germany, Belgium, and England. In addition, there are dozens of practitioners on track for certification.

== Software ==
Lessac's work is the basis for a new software for text-to-speech technology being developed by Lessac Technologies, Inc. (LTI) of West Newton, Massachusetts.

== Personal life ==
Lessac was born in Haifa, then in Ottoman Palestine (modern-day Israel) and moved to the United States with his parents at the age of two. When his parents' marriage broke down, they left him at an orphanage in Pleasantville, New York, where he grew up. He would abandon his original surname and adopted that of a family he had befriended while working as a delivery boy for a delicatessen in Brooklyn.

He was married to Bertha Braverman from 1935 till her death in 1983. They had two children: a son, Michael, and a daughter, Fredi. Lessac died in Los Angeles in September 2011.

== Books ==
- Lessac, Arthur (1967). The use and training of the human voice; a practical approach to speech and voice dynamics (2d ed.). New York: DBS Publications. pp. xviii, 297 p. illus. 26 cm. LCCN 67028352. OCLC 245027.
- Lessac, Arthur (1997). The use and training of the human voice : a bio-dynamic approach to vocal life (3rd ed.). Mountain View, CA: Mayfield Pub. pp. xv, 291 p. : ill., 22 cm. ISBN 1-55934-696-5. LCCN 96018629.
- Lessac, Arthur (1981). Body wisdom : the use and training of the human body (1st ed.). New York, N.Y.: Drama Book Specialists. pp. vii, 278 p. : ill., 27 cm. ISBN 0-89676-070-7. LCCN 81005472. OCLC 7671791.
