= Edward Vernon Sparhawk =

American writer and poet (1798–1838)

Edward Vernon Sparhawk (1798 – January 13, 1838) was an American writer, poet, journalist, editor and publisher.

== Early life ==
Edward Vernon Sparhawk was born in 1798, in Buckstown (now called Bucksport), Massachusetts (the area became part of Maine in 1820), to Thomas Stearns and Mary (Kinsman) Sparhawk. Sparhawk's father, a Dartmouth-educated lawyer from Templeton, Massachusetts, died on June 4, 1807, at the age of 37.

== Montreal ==
In his twenties, Vernon lived in Montreal, Lower Canada with fellow New Englander Ariel Bowman. Bowman published an anonymous book of poetry, Hours of Childhood and Other Poems, in 1820. There has been some contention as to whether the writer of the poems was Sparhawk or Bowman, but a footnote in a stanza memorializing the poet's brother refers to the wreck of the Resource in the Pacific, where Sparhawk's brother William perished in 1818. This points clearly to Sparhawk being the author.

=== The Canadian Times and libel charges ===
Sparhawk and Bowman founded and published The Canadian Times and Weekly Literary and Political Reporter, which was in print from January 1823 until some time in 1824. On January 31, 1823, The Times accused the Legislative Council and House of Assembly of Quebec of anti-British sentiment:

The resolutions and addresses of the Legislative Council and the House of Assembly will be found amongst the proceedings of the Provincial Parliament, and cannot be productive of surprise, when the majorities by which they were carried show how completely anti-British was the composition of these bodies.

The House of Assembly took offense, and on February 3, 1823, the Speaker issued warrants for the arrests of Bowman and Sparhawk for libel. Bowman was apprehended and held briefly before he escaped, while Sparhawk evaded capture.

=== The Widow Rock ===
Sometime in 1824, Sparhawk published The Widow Rock and Other Poems by the American writer Margaret Blennerhassett. The volume was published anonymously, the title page listing its author simply as "A Lady."

== First marriage ==
Sparhawk returned to the United States, and on August 7, 1824, he married Julia Brush Lyman in Burlington, Vermont. They remained married until her death in 1836.

== Duff Green incident ==
The late 1820s found Sparhawk working as a reporter in Washington, D.C., for the National Intelligencer. On January 25, 1828, the owner and editor of the United States Telegraph, Duff Green, confronted Sparhawk in the United States Capitol and accused him of deliberately and maliciously misquoting a speech by John Randolph of Roanoke. The Intelligencer reported that Green viciously assaulted Sparhawk, while the Telegraph insisted that any physical altercation was minor and that Sparhawk has barely been hurt. A few days later, Sparhawk petitioned the United States Senate for redress.

== The Southern Literary Messenger ==
Sparhawk became acquainted with James E. Heath, editor of the Southern Literary Messenger. His first contribution to the journal, entitled "A Tale of a Nose," appeared under the pen name Pertinax Placid in the April 1835, issue.

In May Sparhawk succeeded Heath as editor of the Messenger. He was introduced in a "Publisher's Notice" by publisher Thomas Willis White as "a gentleman of approved literary tastes and attainments." His editorship was short-lived, however, as in August of the same year White removed him from the position, although his relationship with the journal continued.

== Second marriage ==
Sparhawk married his second wife, Eloise Warrell, in Richmond, Virginia, on August 8, 1837.

== Death ==
On January 13, 1838, Sparhawk reported feeling weak and suddenly collapsed, and died shortly thereafter of a lung hemorrhage.
