= Marian Douglas =

Annie Douglas Green Robinson
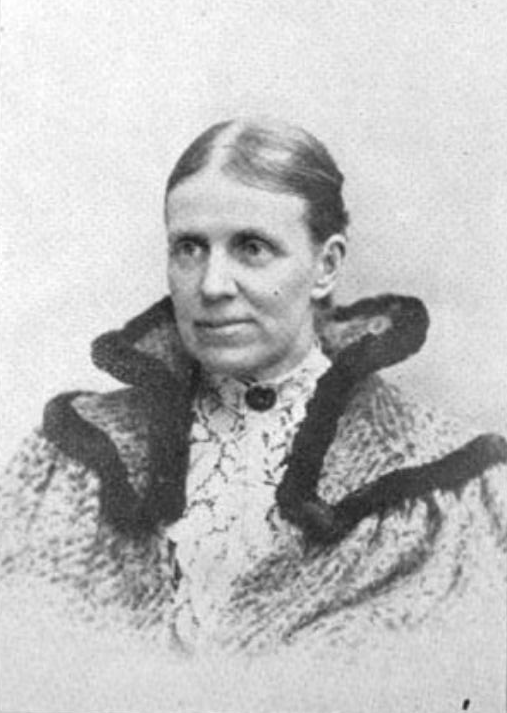
- (1894)
- Born: Annie Douglas Green; 1842; Plymouth, New Hampshire, U.S.
- Died: June 7, 1913 (aged 70–71); Bristol, New Hampshire, U.S.
- Occupations: poet; short story writer
- Spouse: Frank Warren Robinson (m. 1877)
- Writing career
- Pen name: Marian Douglas
- Genre: children's literature

Marian Douglas was the pen name of Annie D. Green, later, Annie Douglas Green Robinson (1842–1913), an American poet and short story writer. Her poems appeared irregularly in various periodicals. She is best known by her poems and stories for children.

== Early life and education ==
Annie Douglas Green (misspelled, Greene) was born in Plymouth, New Hampshire, in 1842. She was one of the eight children of William Green (1788–1869) and Harriet (Kimball) Green (1799–1881). Annie's siblings were Harriet (b. 1830), Benjamin (b. 1832), Clarissa (b. 1834), Mary (b. 1836), Martha (b. 1838), and Clarissa (b. 1845). Peter Green of Lancaster, Massachusetts, was her grandfather. He graduated from Harvard University in 1766, was a surgeon in the Revolutionary War and a physician in Concord, New Hampshire, from 1772 for fifty years. Books from his library were placed in the New Hampshire Historical Society Library.

She went to Bristol, New Hampshire, with her parents when a girl, and there all her literary work was done.

Douglas received the greater part of her education in private schools, of which it is probable that Bradford Academy, Haverhill, Massachusetts, was one.

== Career ==
Her first published poem appeared, when she was fifteen, in the Southern Literary Messenger, whose editor, John Reuben Thompson, the poet of Virginia, showed much interest in her early verses. In 1861 and 1862, she, for a time, sent, weekly, a poem to the Boston Transcript, one of them, "The Soldier's Mother", being nearly as widely copied by the papers of the South as by those of the North. A little later, she became a contributor to Our Young Folks, and to The Nursery, a juvenile magazine of Boston.

A collection of her children's verses, titled Picture Poems for Young People, was issued in 1872. Some of these poems, as "The Motherless Turkeys", "Two Pictures", and others, were widely copied, both in the U.S. and in England. A subsequent edition of this book was issued in 1882.

A small book in prose, Peter and Polly, a story of child-life in the American Revolution, appeared in 1876, and this, likewise, was favorably noticed by the reviewers. The New York Evening Post, characterized it as "delicious in its artistic simplicity." Since her first volume, however, Douglas allowed her verses to remain uncollected, and they became widely scattered, some of those originally appearing in The Atlantic, Scribner's Magazine, The Galaxy, and elsewhere. Many of her later poems were brief, like "The Rose" and "The Yellow Leaf", and found place in Harper's Bazar, to which paper she was an occasional contributor for many years.

== Personal life ==
On April 11, 1877, at New Hampton, New Hampshire, she married Frank Warren Robinson (1839–1913).

Annie Douglas Green Robinson remained a Bristol resident all her life, dying June 7, 1913.

== Selected works ==
Days we remember

=== Annie D. Green ===
- Picture Poems for Young People, 1872, 1882 (2nd ed.) (text)
- Peter and Polly: Or, Home-life in New England a Hundred Years Ago, 1876 (text)

=== Annie Douglas Green Robinson ===
- In the Poverty Year, 1901 (text)
- Days we remember, 1903 (text)
