= Pilot and Transcript =

American Whig Party newspaper published in Baltimore, Maryland, US

The Pilot and Transcript
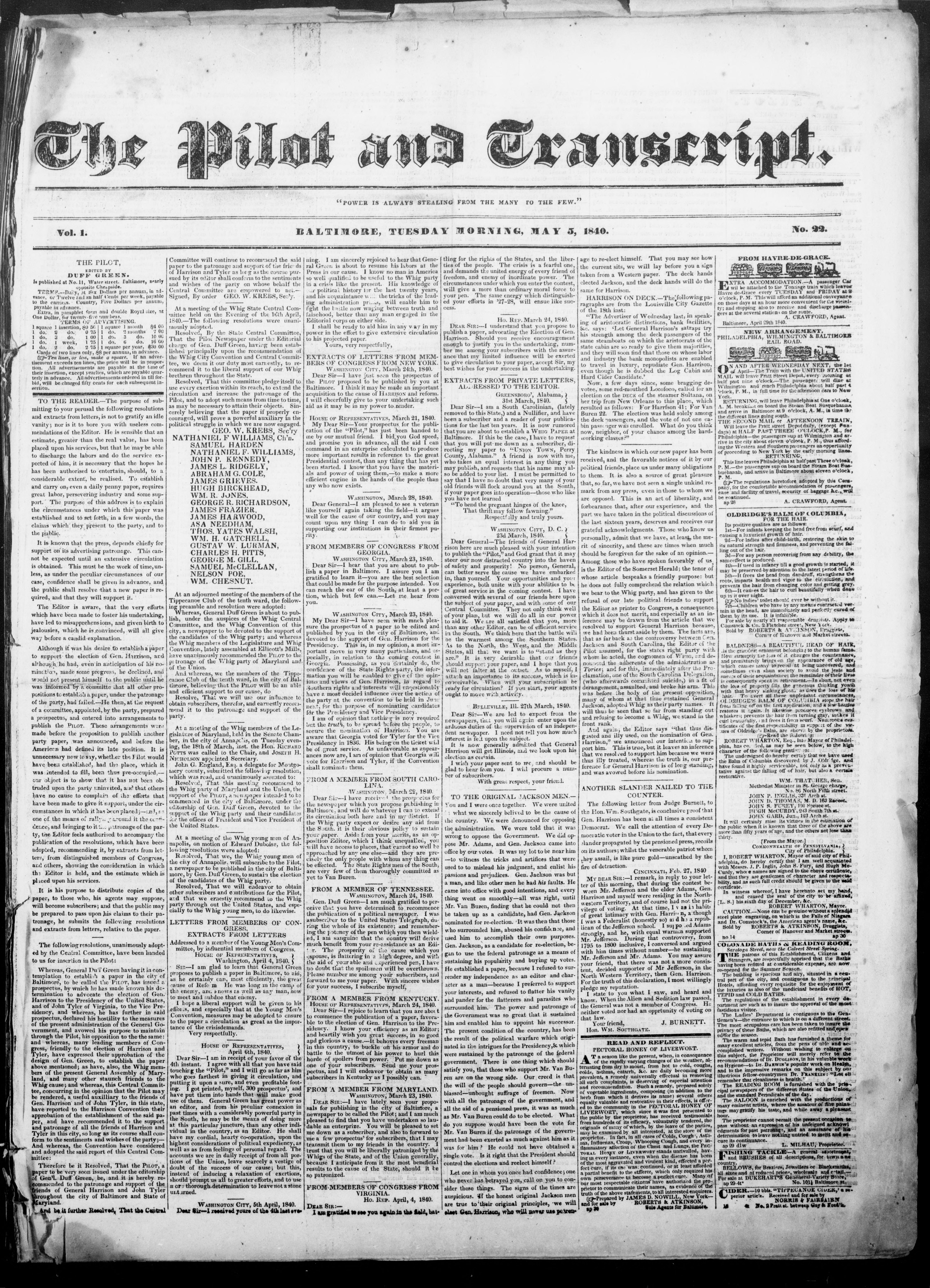
- The front page of The Pilot and Transcript, May 5, 1840
- Type: Daily newspaper
- Format: Broadsheet
- Editor: Duff Green
- Founded: April 2, 1840
- Ceased publication: January 25, 1841
- Political alignment: Whig
- Headquarters: Baltimore, Maryland

The Pilot and Transcript was a daily Whig newspaper published in Baltimore, MD from April 2, 1840 to January 25, 1841. The paper was briefly titled "The Pilot" before being renamed "The Pilot and Transcript".

Duff Green established The Pilot and Transcript to support the Harrison-Tyler presidential ticket. While the paper was initially successful in supporting the campaign, Green soon got caught up in a religious controversy about the influence of the Catholic Church in politics. Maryland Whigs grew uncomfortable with the controversy and withdrew their support of the Pilot leading to the paper's end in 1841.
