= Southern Literary Messenger =

American magazine (1834–1945)

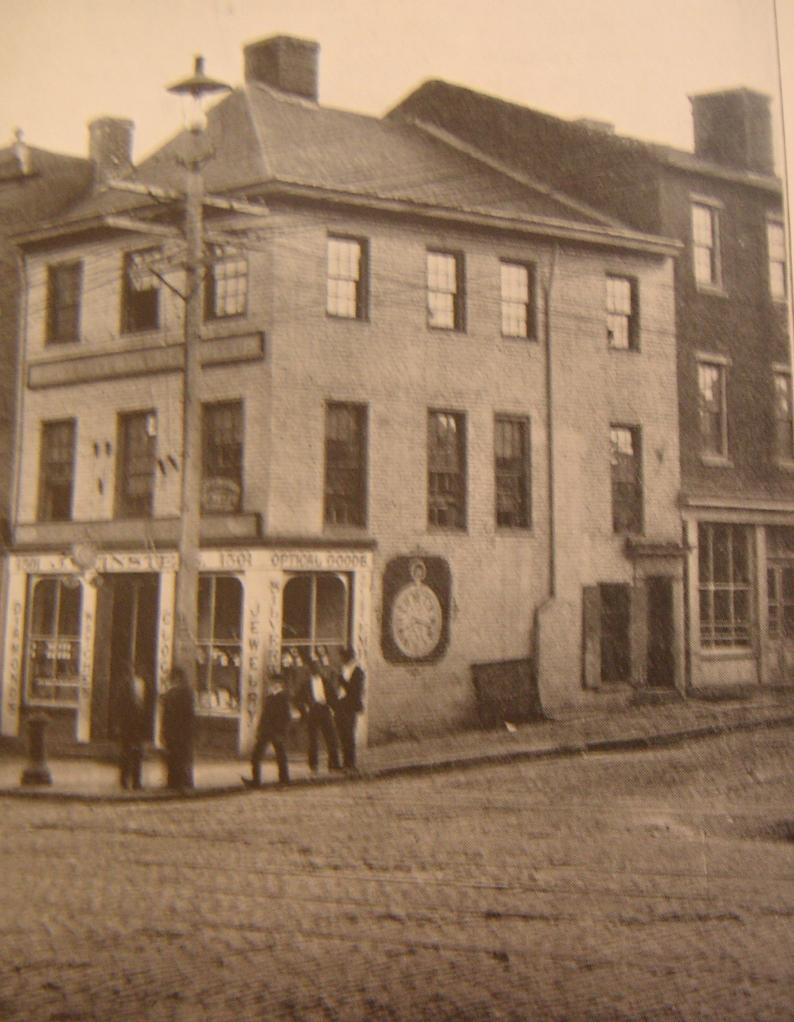
- The Southern Literary Messenger building in Richmond (1902)
- Categories: Literary magazine
- Frequency: Monthly
- Founder: Thomas Willis White
- First issue: August 1834
- Final issue: June 1864
- Country: United States
- Based in: Richmond, Virginia
- Language: English

The Southern Literary Messenger was a periodical published in Richmond, Virginia, from August 1834 to June 1864, and from 1939 to 1945. Each issue carried a subtitle of "Devoted to Every Department of Literature and the Fine Arts" or some variation thereof and included poetry, fiction, nonfiction, reviews, and historical notes. It was founded by Thomas Willis White, who served as publisher and occasional editor until his death, in 1843.

White hired Edgar Allan Poe in 1835 as a staff writer and critic. Others involved with the periodical included Matthew Fontaine Maury and Maury's kinsman Benjamin Blake Minor. Publication ended in June 1864, in part because of Richmond's involvement in the American Civil War, and was revived from 1939–1945.

== History ==
The Southern Literary Messenger first appeared in August 1834 with Thomas Willis White (1788–1843) as publisher. In the inaugural issue, he stated that his aim was "to stimulate the pride and genius of the south, and awaken from its long slumber the literary exertion of this portion of our country." That was in reference to the fact that at the time, most magazines were published in Boston, New York City, and Philadelphia.

Edgar Allan Poe served as an editor for a time (see below). After his departure, White resumed editorial duties before he hired Lieutenant Matthew Fontaine Maury USN as editor from 1840 to 1843. Upon White's death in 1843, Benjamin Blake Minor served as editor and publisher from August 1843 to October 1847.

The loss of writing and subscriptions led to the journal's cancellation in June 1864. As was explained editorially in the last issue, the press in Richmond and the town in general had been thrown into considerable disarray by the American Civil War.

== Content ==
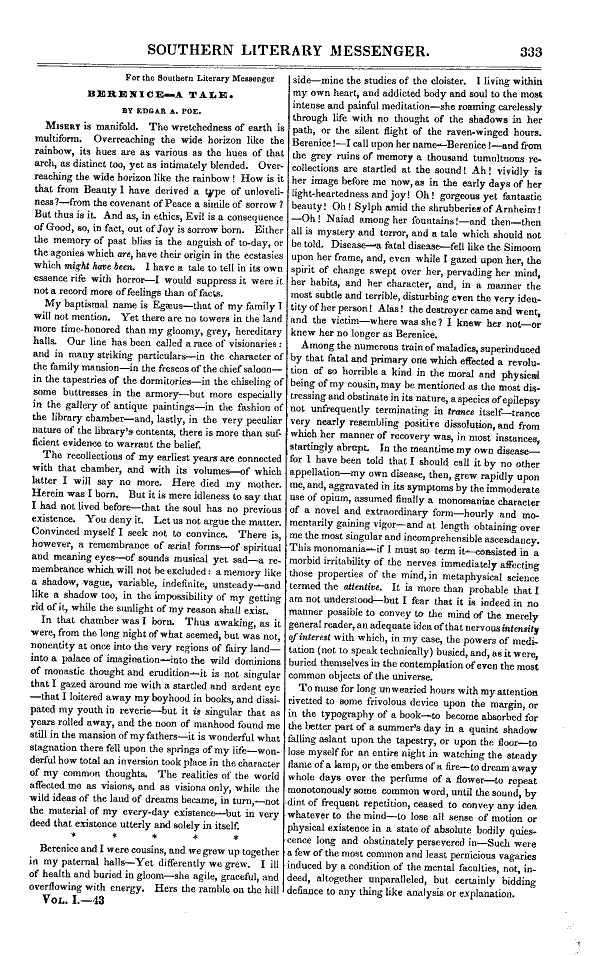
"Berenice" by Edgar Allan Poe as published in the Southern Literary Messenger, March 1835.

The Southern Literary Messenger featured poems, fiction, nonfiction, translations, reviews, legal articles, and Virginia historical notes. Each issue carried the subtitle "Devoted to Every Department of Literature and the Fine Arts" or some variation of it. The periodical was published approximately monthly, and it initially had subscribed mostly readers in the North but it picked up readers in the South and writers over time as more Southerners wrote articles to be published, as was stated in an 1840 issue of the Messenger. James E. Heath, the first editor of the Southern Literary Messenger wrote:

From our Northern and Eastern friends we have received more complimentary notices than from any of our Southern brethren without the limits of our own State. We say this not in a reproachful spirit, but in a somewhat sad conviction of mind, that we who live on the sunny side of Mason and Dixon's line are not yet sufficiently inspired with a sense of importance of maintaining our just rights, or rather our proper representation in the Republic of Letters.

In February 1861, the Southern Literary Messenger defended the secession movement by publishing an article by William H. Holcombe, a doctor, entitled "The Alternative: A Separate Nationality, or the Africanization of the South."

== Involvement of Poe ==
Edgar Allan Poe was hired as a staff writer and critic in August 1835, possibly based on a recommendation to White from John Pendleton Kennedy.

Just a month later, White fired Poe, allegedly for his drinking habits, but rehired him in October. By December, Poe was made editor of the journal. While working for the Messenger, Poe published 37 reviews of American and foreign books and periodicals, cementing his place as a premier critic in the United States.

Poe was proud of his accomplishments with the journal and may have aided in a large jump in subscribers. In a letter years later, in 1844, Poe wrote that he began working when the Messenger had about 700 subscribers and left when it had 5,500 paying subscribers.

Besides criticism, Poe published many first printings of his now famous works in the Messenger, including the controversial "Berenice", "Morella" and, in installments, parts of his only novel The Narrative of Arthur Gordon Pym of Nantucket. Poe left the magazine with the January 1837 issue but still contributed works even after White's death.

== Editors ==
- James E. Heath
- Edward Vernon Sparhawk
- Edgar Allan Poe
- Lieut. Matthew Fontaine Maury, U. S. N.
- Benjamin Blake Minor
- John Reuben Thompson (1823-1873), editor and proprietor from 1847 until 1860
- Dr. George William Bagby

=== Contributors ===
- Marian Douglas (1842–1913), poet and short story writer
- Jane T. Worthington (1821-1847), essayist and poet

== See also ==
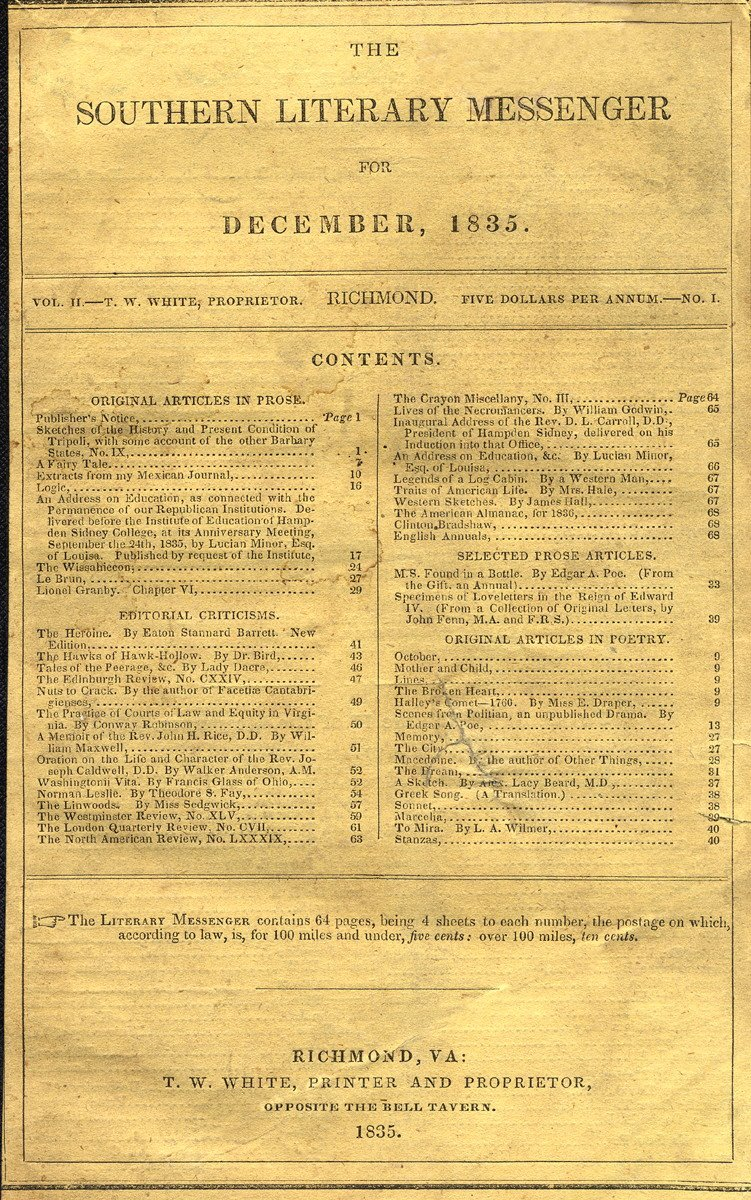
December, 1835, Southern Literary Messenger, featured "MS. Found in a Bottle" and "Politian" by Edgar Allan Poe.

Other American journals that Edgar Allan Poe was involved with include:

- American Review: A Whig Journal
- Broadway Journal
- Burton's Gentleman's Magazine
- Godey's Lady's Book
- Graham's Magazine
- The Stylus

== Bibliography ==
- Kevin J. Hayes, ed. (2015). "Southern Literary Messenger". History of Virginia Literature. Cambridge University Press. ISBN 978-1-107-05777-7.
