= Jonathan Elliot (publisher) =

English-American printer and publisher (1784–1846)

- Born: 1784; Cumberland, England
- Died: March 12, 1846 (aged 61–62); Washington, D.C., United States
- Children: 4
- Military career
- Allegiance: Venezuela; United States
- Service years: 1810–1813
- Conflict: Venezuelan War of Independence; War of 1812

Jonathan Elliot (1784 – March 12, 1846) was an English-American printer, newspaper editor, and publisher of a series of historical document compilations. Immigrating to New York City as an adolescent, he served as a foreign volunteer during the Colombian War of Independence, before returning to the United States for a brief stint of service in the War of 1812. He moved to Washington, D.C., in 1813, where he began work as a newspaper publisher. He began the daily newspaper Washington City Gazette (disrupted by the British sack of Washington) and strongly supported the unsuccessful 1816 presidential candidacy of William H. Crawford, for which he was rewarded with a series of printing contracts.

Following another unsuccessful Crawford run in the 1824 election and business conflicts with President John Quincy Adams, Elliot sold the paper to John Silva Meehan and largely exited the news industry. Later in his career, he published a series of history books and compilations of documents. Little is known about Elliot's personal life, beyond that he married twice and had four children. He died in Washington D.C., in March 1846, a year after publishing his final work.

== Biography ==
Jonathan Elliot was born near Carlisle, England, in 1784. He emigrated to the United States in 1802, and began work as a printer in New York City. Motivated by political zeal, he traveled to Caracas in 1810 to fight under Simón Bolívar in the Venezuelan War of Independence, where he was severely wounded in combat. Following General Francisco de Miranda's surrender to Spanish forces in 1812, he was taken prisoner, but was able to return to the United States in 1813. He enlisted within the United States Army upon his return, with the intent of serving in the War of 1812, though it is unclear whether he saw combat.

=== News publications ===
After his military service, Elliot settled in Washington, D.C. He partnered with two other editors in December 1813 to produce the city's first daily evening newspaper, the Washington City Gazette. The Gazette saw its first publication in January 1814, although it ceased publication following the destruction of his printing press during the British sack of Washington in August 1814. He revived the publication in November 1815 as the Washington City Weekly Gazette. The paper heavily championed Georgia senator William H. Crawford's campaign for the Democratic-Republican nomination in the 1816 United States presidential election, although James Monroe was able to win both the nomination and the general election. Crawford, appointed by Monroe as Secretary of War, rewarded the paper with lucrative printing contracts with the Department of War (and following Crawford's transfer to Treasury Secretary, the Department of the Treasury.)

The paper returned to daily status in 1817 as the City of Washington Gazette, funded by increased patronage and government printing contracts. Although continuing to favor Crawford, Elliot offered support to Secretary of State John Quincy Adams in the 1824 presidential election in exchange for printing contracts. Adams had previously hired Elliot for printing services, but refused further commissions due to high prices. Elliot threatened to sink Adams' campaign, claiming that he had previously prevented John C. Calhoun from becoming president, but Adams continued to reject his services. Adams later described Elliot as "having no character of his own—penurious and venal—metal to receive any stamp." Elliot once again rallied support for Crawford, but the campaign collapsed after Crawford suffered a stroke.

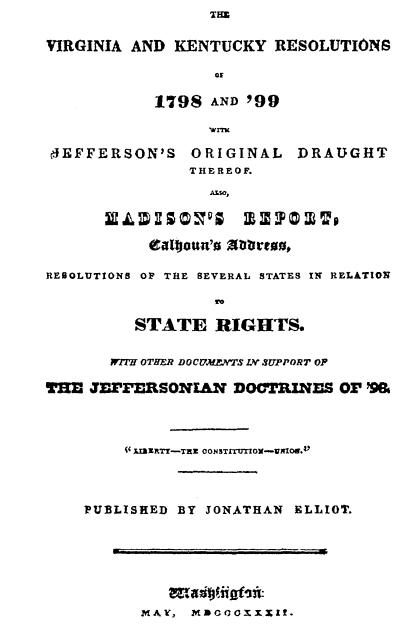
Cover of Elliot's Resolutions

In early 1826, Elliot sold the paper to John Silva Meehan on behalf of backers William B. Lewis and John Eaton. Meehan renamed the paper the United States' Telegraph and pivoted its coverage towards a strong Jacksonian stance. Elliot largely retired from journalism, although briefly worked as an editor for We the People, an anti-Jacksonian and pro-Henry Clay campaign paper published from March to November 1828.

=== History publications ===
Following his retirement from news publication, Elliot began publishing various history books and compilations of historical documents. His three-volume Debates (1827–1830), (Note: "The Debates, Resolutions, and other Proceedings, in Convention, on the Adoption of the Federal Constitution") covering the adoption of the Constitution by state ratifying conventions, remained the sole scholarly source until the late 20th century, although faced later academic criticism for possible partisan bias. He may have published the work in order to support Calhoun, despite previously opposing the candidate. Elliot's Debates was republished in seven different editions, each varying slightly: as a result, the work was described by historian James H. Hutson "bibliographical brainteaser". Elliot apologized for any shortcomings in the preface to the first edition of the Debates, writing "the sentiments they contain may, in some instances, have been inaccurately taken down." Such errors may have been exacerbated by inaccurate shorthand reporting during the conventions.

Later in 1827, he published the Diplomatic Code of the United States of America. An 1832 2nd edition of Elliot's Code was adopted by Secretary of State Louis McLane as a standard text for the State Department. In 1830, Elliot published a history of Washington, D.C., titled Historical Sketches of the Ten Miles Square Forming the District of Columbia. His 1832 Resolutions (Note: "The Virginia and Kentucky resolutions of 1798 and '99 : with Jefferson's original draught thereof. Also, Madison's report, Calhoun's address, resolutions of the several states in relation to state rights. With other documents in support of the Jeffersonian doctrines of '98.") included various excerpts related to the Kentucky and Virginia Resolutions, which Elliot viewed as "the most important statement of constitutional federalism" and "the true principles of the constitution." In 1845, he published his final work, a compilation of American and British treasury reports and public debt debates entitled The Funding Systems of the United States and of Great Britain.

=== Personal life and death ===
Little is known of Elliot's personal life, leading to his description as a "phantom" and "bibliographic abstraction" by the Dictionary of American Biography. An obituary described him as "frank, generous, warm-hearted". He married twice, and had four children. He died in Washington D.C., on March 12, 1846.
