= Berenice (short story) =

- Short story by Edgar Allan Poe
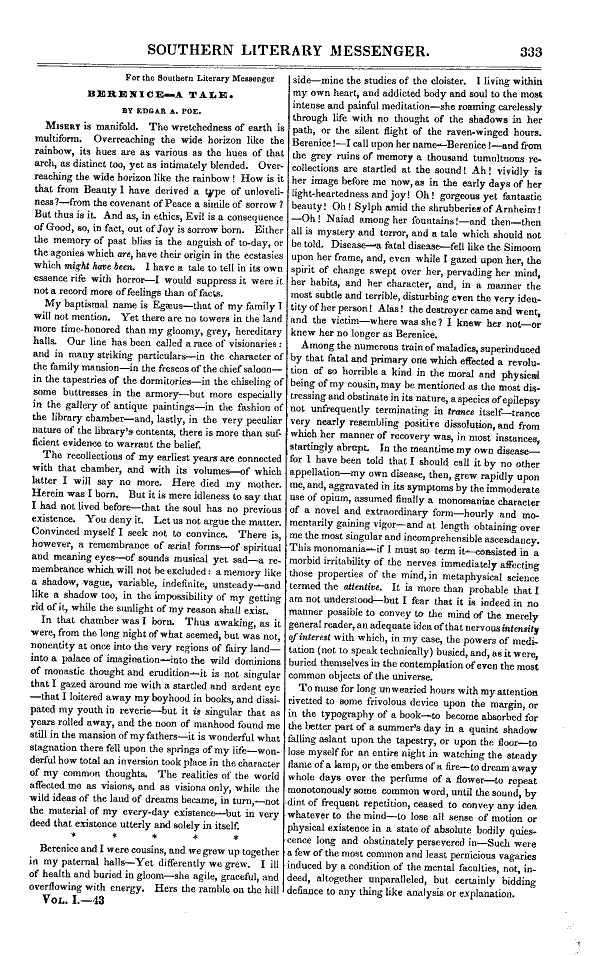
- "Berenice" as it appeared in its original published form.

Text available at Wikisource
- Original title: Berenice – A Tale
- Country: United States
- Language: English
- Genre: Horror short story

Publication
- Published in: Southern Literary Messenger
- Publication type: Print (Periodical)
- Publication date: March 1835

"Berenice" is a short horror story by American writer Edgar Allan Poe, first published in the Southern Literary Messenger in 1835. The story is narrated by Egaeus, who is preparing to marry his cousin Berenice. He tends to fall into periods of intense focus, during which he seems to separate himself from the outside world. Berenice begins to deteriorate from an unnamed disease until only her teeth remain healthy. Egaeus obsesses over them. When Berenice is buried, he continues to contemplate her teeth. One day, he awakens with an uneasy feeling from a trance-like state and hears screams. A servant reports that Berenice's grave has been disturbed, and she is still alive. Beside Egaeus is a shovel, a poem about "visiting the grave of my beloved", and a box containing 32 teeth.

Contemporary readers were horrified by the story's violence and complained to the editor of the Messenger. Although Poe later published a self-censored version of the work, he believed the story should be judged solely by how many copies it sold.

== Plot ==
The narrator Egaeus is a man born in a gloomy, ancient family mansion filled with books and artifacts that fuel his introspective and obsessive nature. Egaeus suffers from a monomania, a condition causing him to fixate intensely on trivial objects, such as a shadow or a word, losing himself in morbid contemplation. He grows up with his cousin Berenice, a vibrant and carefree contrast to his own frail and melancholic disposition. Despite their closeness, Egaeus never loves her in a conventional sense, viewing her more as an abstract subject for analysis than a person.

Berenice falls ill with a devastating disease resembling epilepsy, which drastically alters her appearance and personality, leaving her a shadow of her former self. Her condition worsens, marked by trance-like states resembling death. Egaeus, meanwhile, becomes increasingly consumed by his monomania, particularly fixating on Berenice's teeth, which he perceives as possessing an almost sentient quality. This obsession grows to a frenzied desire to possess them, believing they hold the key to restoring his sanity.

As their wedding approaches, Berenice's health deteriorates further. One evening, Egaeus, lost in his fixation on her teeth, encounters her in the library, emaciated and transformed, her teeth revealed in a haunting smile that intensifies his obsession. After her apparent sudden death from a seizure and subsequent burial, Egaeus, in a disoriented state, finds himself in the library with no clear memory of the intervening hours. A servant reveals that Berenice's grave has been disturbed, and her body, though disfigured, is still alive. Egaeus discovers his clothes are bloodied, his hand marked by nail scratches, and a spade against the wall. A box on his table, containing dental instruments and thirty-two teeth, confirms his act: driven by his monomania, he exhumed Berenice and extracted her teeth while she was still alive.

The Latin epigraph, from a poem by Ibn Zaiat, "Dicebant mihi sodales si sepulchrum amicae visitarem, curas meas aliquantulum fore levatas", at the head of the text, may be translated as: "My companions said to me, if I would visit the grave of my friend, I might somewhat alleviate my worries." This quotation is also seen by Egaeus in an open book towards the end of the story.

== Analysis ==
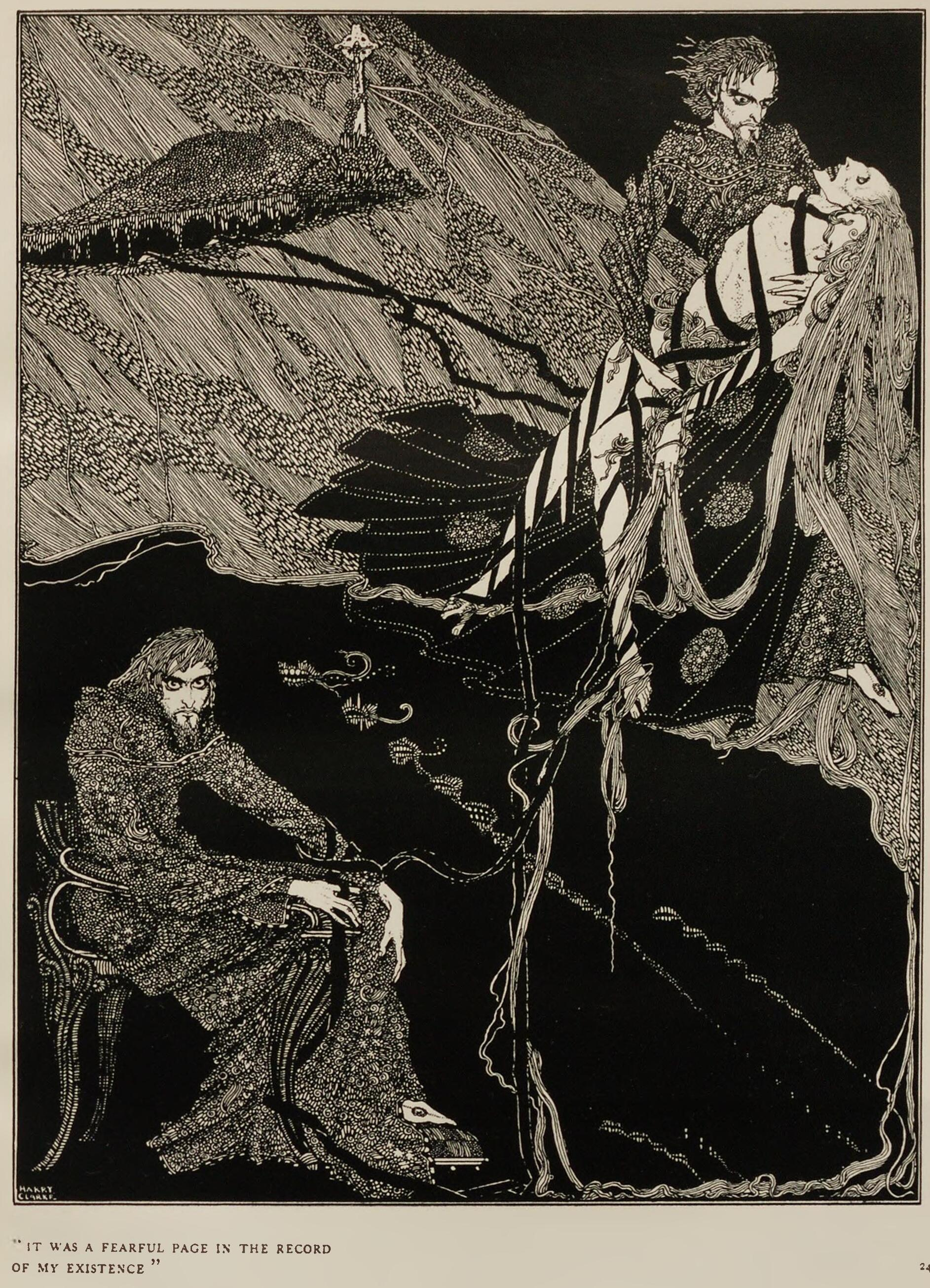
Illustration for "Berenice" by Harry Clarke, 1919

In "Berenice", Poe was following the popular traditions of Gothic fiction, a genre well-followed by American and British readers for several decades. Poe, however, made his Gothic stories more sophisticated, dramatizing terror by using more realistic images. This story is one of Poe's most violent. As the narrator looks at the box which he may subconsciously know contains his cousin's teeth, he asks himself, "Why... did the hairs of my head erect themselves on end, and the blood of my body become congealed within my veins?" Poe does not actually include the scene where the teeth are pulled out. The reader also knows that Egaeus was in a trance-like state at the time, incapable of responding to evidence that his cousin was still alive as he committed the gruesome act. Additionally, the story emphasizes that all 32 of her teeth were removed.

The main theme lies in the question that Egaeus asks himself: "How is it that from beauty I have derived a type of unloveliness?" Poe also uses a character afflicted with monomania for the first time, a device he uses many times again.

Teeth are used symbolically in many of Poe's stories to symbolize mortality. Other uses include the "sepulchral and disgusting" horse's teeth in "Metzengerstein", lips writhing about the teeth of the mesmerized man in "The Facts in the Case of M. Valdemar", and the sound of grating teeth in "Hop-Frog".

Egaeus and Berenice are both representative characters. Egaeus, literally born in the library, represents intellectualism. He is a quiet, lonely man whose obsession only emphasizes his interest on thought and study. Berenice is a more physical character, described as "roaming carelessly through life" and "agile, graceful, and overflowing with energy." She is, however, an oppressed woman, having "spoke no word" throughout the story. Her only purpose, as with many of Poe's female characters, is to be beautiful and to die. Egaeus loses his interest in the full person of Berenice as she gets sick; she becomes an object to analyze, not to admire. He dehumanizes her by describing "the" forehead of Berenice, rather than "her" forehead.

Poe may have used the names of the two characters to call to mind the conventions of ancient Greek tragedy. Berenice's name (which means "bringer of victory") comes from a poem by Callimachus. In the poem, Berenice promises her hair to Aphrodite if her husband returns from war safely. Egaeus may come from Aegeus, a legendary king of Athens who had committed suicide when he thought his son Theseus had died attempting to kill the Minotaur. Poe's spelling of the name, however, suggests a different allusion: Shakespeare's A Midsummer Night's Dream, which depicts Egeus as a figure who fails to understand love.

The final lines of the story are purposely protracted using a series of conjunctions connecting multiple clauses. The rhythm as well as the heavy accented consonant and long vowels sounds help unify the effect.

This is one of the few Poe stories whose narrator is named.

=== Major themes ===
Several often-repeated themes in Poe's works are found in this story:

- The death of a beautiful woman (see also "Ligeia", "Morella", "The Oval Portrait", "The Philosophy of Composition")
- Being buried alive (see also "The Cask of Amontillado", "The Fall of the House of Usher", "The Premature Burial" – being buried alive is also very briefly mentioned in "How to Write a Blackwood Article" as a source of possible inspiration for the Signora Psyche Zenobia)
- Mental illness (see also "The Fall of the House of Usher", "The Tell-Tale Heart", "The System of Doctor Tarr and Professor Fether")
- Catalepsy (see also "The Premature Burial", "The Fall of the House of Usher")

== Publication history and critical response ==
First published in the relatively genteel Southern Literary Messenger in March 1835. Many readers were shocked by the violence in "Berenice" and complained to publisher Thomas W. White, leading to an edited version eventually being published in 1840. The four removed paragraphs describe a scene where Egaeus visits Berenice before her burial and clearly sees that she is still alive as she moves her finger and smiles.

Poe disagreed with the complaints. A month after "Berenice" was published, he wrote to White saying that many magazines achieved fame because of similar stories. Whether in bad taste or not, he said it was his goal to be appreciated, and "to be appreciated you must be read." He admitted, "I allow that it approaches the very verge of bad taste – but I will not sin quite so egregiously again." Even so, Poe also emphasized that its final judgment should come not from the taste of the reading public but on the circulation of the magazine.

== Adaptations ==
Director Eric Rohmer directed and took the lead in his 1954 short film adaptation of "Berenice" entitled "Bérénice", filmed in 16 mm black and white with cinematography by Jacques Rivette.

Eerie Magazine Issue 11 (September 1967) includes a comic adaptation by Archie Goodwin with art by Jerry Grandenetti.

CBS Radio Mystery Theater presented an adapted version of the story for its radio play "Berenice" as its January 9, 1975 episode. It was directed by Himan Brown, Adapted by George Lowther, starring Michael Tolan, Norman Rose, Joan Lovejoy, and Roberta Maxwell.

Vincent Price performed "Berenice" on his 1975 album The Imp of the Perverse and Other Tales (Caedmon Records TC—1450). On the same LP Price also read "Morella" and "The Imp of the Perverse". All three Poe stories were re-issued in 2000 on the Harper Collins 5-CD set, The Edgar Allan Poe Audio Collection.

The 1995 computer game The Dark Eye contains reenactments of selected stories by Poe. One of them is based on "Berenice" and allows the player to experience the story from the alternating points of view of both Egaeus and Berenice.

There was a low-budget film adaptation released to video in 2004.

"Berenice" is one of the short stories incorporated into the 2023 miniseries The Fall of the House of Usher; Frederick Usher fixates on his bedridden wife Morella's smile and eventually rips out her teeth.
