= John Reuben Thompson =

American journalist (1823–1873)

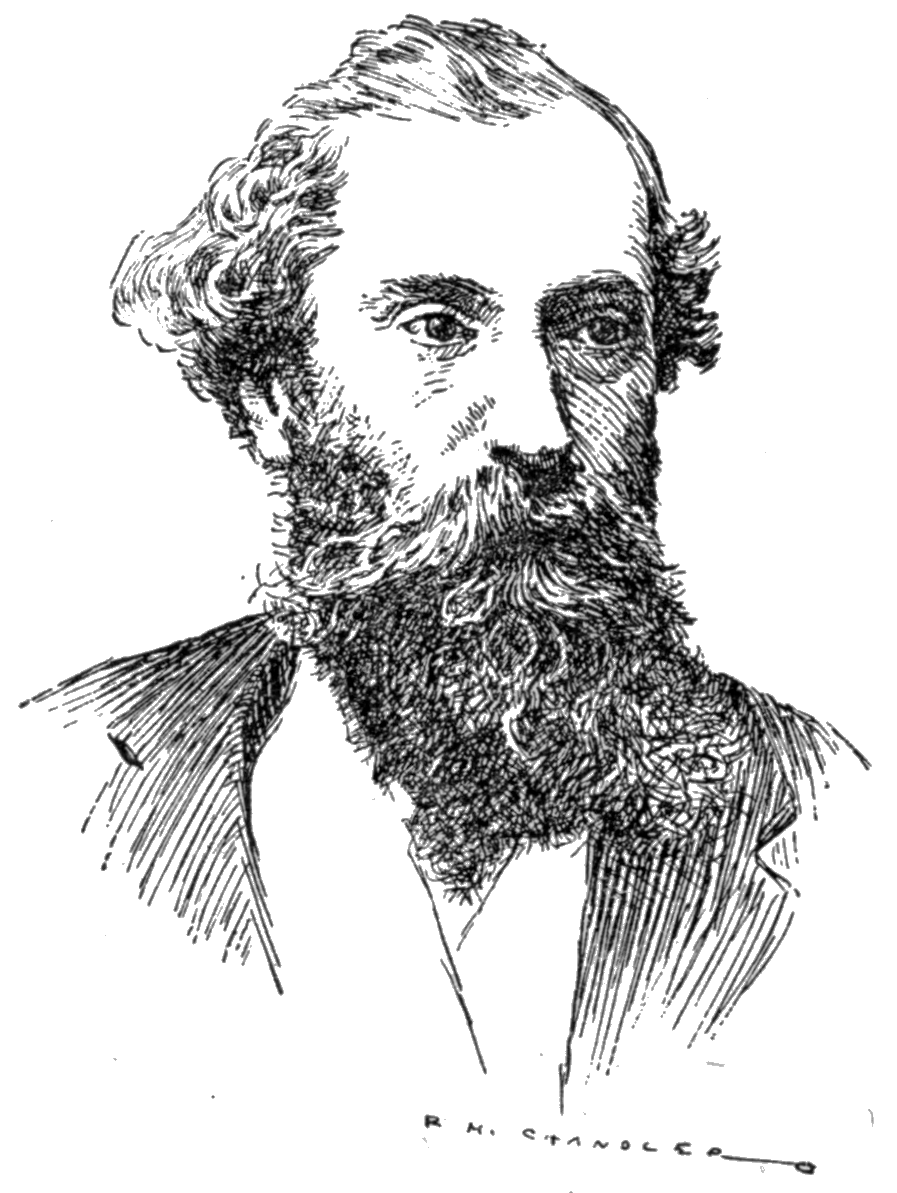
- Born: October 23, 1823; Richmond, Virginia, US
- Died: April 30, 1873 (aged 49); New York, New York, US

John Reuben Thompson (October 23, 1823 – April 30, 1873) was an American poet, journalist, editor and publisher.

== Biography ==
John Reuben Thompson was born in Richmond, Virginia, in 1823. He graduated in law from the University of Virginia in 1845.

Thompson did not pursue a career in the legal field, but instead dedicated himself to journalism and editorship. In 1847, he became the editor of the Southern Literary Messenger in Richmond, and in 1859 editor of The Southern Field and Fireside in Augusta, Georgia. Thompson did not take part in the Civil War, suffering from tuberculosis. After a recuperative trip to Scotland, went to London in 1864, became editor of the Index, a pro-Confederate newspaper, and promoted the Southern cause throughout various literary and social circles. Thompson was introduced to Thomas Carlyle by Anne Isabella Thackeray Ritchie in October. On the fourteenth, Thompson spent the first of many evenings at Carlyle's House, engaging in discourse which Carlyle so delighted in that he insisted upon accompanying Thompson to his hotel in the evening, where they conversed on various topics from Christopher Wren to Alfred, Lord Tennyson. He continued to visit Carlyle several times a month until Thompson's return to Virginia in September 1866.

In 1866 he became editor of the New York Evening Post, a position that he maintained until his death in New York in 1873.

Thompson was also a poet, most of his works being war-poems.

During his career and travels, Thompson had the chance to work closely with Edgar Allan Poe, and many notable Southern authors, such as William Gilmore Simms, Henry Timrod, Paul Hamilton Hayne and Philip Pendleton Cooke, as well as European authors.

== Works ==
- Genius and Character of Edgar Allan Poe
- Poems of John R. Thompson
