= Thomas Willis White =

American publisher and printer

Thomas Willis White (1788–1843) was an American printer and publisher who founded the Southern Literary Messenger. He was born in Williamsburg, Virginia. He became an apprentice at the Virginia Federalist at the age of eleven. Later he gained work as a composer in Norfolk, then moved to Philadelphia and Boston to learn the printing and publishing business. In 1834 he founded the Southern Literary Messenger in Richmond, Virginia, which became the most prominent literary periodical published in the south. Edgar Allan Poe wrote for the periodical as well as critiquing the work of others and editing the journal.

== Early life ==
Thomas was born in Williamsburg, Virginia, the son of Thomas White and Sarah Davis, on 28 March 1788. His father died of yellow fever when he was eight years old. He received very little education before becoming an apprentice to William Rind and John Stuart at the Virginia Federalist, a newspaper in Richmond, Virginia. When his family moved to Norfolk, he obtained work at the Norfolk Gazette and Publick Ledger. When he set out on his own, he moved to Philadelphia, and then Boston, to learn the printing and publishing business. In 1809 he married Margaret Ann Ferguson in Gates County, North Carolina.

== Publishing business ==
In 1817 he returned to Richmond and established a publishing business. In 1820, he wrote Thomas Jefferson asking him for advice on books that he could publish that might be profitable.

They exchanged a total of ten letters. Jefferson responded that the only book he could recommend was Baxter's History of England but that it might not be profitable. He also pointed out that the only copy of Baxter in America was the one that he had donated to the Library of Congress.

He suggested that White might obtain one in England and have it shipped over.

He published several pamphlets that are pro-slavery, including Thomas Dew's Review of the Debate [on the abolition of slavery] in the Virginia Legislature of 1831 and 1832 and George Baxter's An Essay on the Abolition of Slavery (1836).

== Southern Literary Messenger ==
In 1834 White founded the Southern Literary Messenger. Its masthead read "Devoted To Every Department Of Literature And The Fine Arts". He intended it to be a platform for southern writers of prose and poetry to publish their work. The first issue was published in August 1834 and included laudatory comments from John Quincy Adams and James Fenimore Cooper, among others. It opened with this statement.

It is understood that the first number of the "Messenger," will be sent forth by its Publisher, as a kind of pioneer, to spy out the land of literary promise, and to report whether the same be fruitful or barren, before he resolves upon future action. It would be a mortifying discovery, if instead of kindness and good will, he should be repulsed by the coldness and neglect of a Virginia public. Hundreds of similar publications thrive and prosper north of the Potomac, sustained as they are by the liberal hand of patronage. Shall not one be supported in the whole south?

In February of 1835 White wrote James Madison asking if he had any manuscripts that he would like published. Madison, who was recovering from an illness and still confined to his room at the time, did not reply personally, but his wife Dolley wrote a letter in response. Shortly thereafter, she sent White a manuscript of Madison's Jonathan Bull & Mary Bull, an allegory about slavery that Madison likely wrote around 1821 in response to the Missouri Compromise, asking him to publish it anonymously.

White published the allegory in the March 1835 issue with the disclaimer that "We are sorry that we are not permitted to announce the source from which we derive the original story or apologue of "Jonathan Bull and Mary Bull." Its own merit however, and its obvious application to events of the time at which it was written, will attract a due share of attention." That same issue contained the first contribution from Edgar Allan Poe, titled "Berenice."

In August 1835, after accepting several pieces from Poe, White hired him to write literary critiques and assist in editing the journal. The relationship did not last long due to Poe's excessive drinking and unreliability. White wrote Poe one month later stating, "You have fine talents, Edgar, — and you ought to have them respected as well as yourself. Learn to respect yourself, and you will very soon find that you are respected. Separate yourself from the bottle, and bottle companions, for ever!" Poe was dismissed in 1837 and never returned.

In 1842, while on a business trip to New York, White suffered a stroke while dining at the Astor House. He was returned to Richmond by ship, and lingered until January 1843 when a second stroke took his life. A lengthy obituary was published in the February issue of Southern Literary Messenger.

== Personal life ==
White married Margaret Ann Ferguson in 1809 in Gates County, North Carolina. They had seven children together, three sons, and four daughters. Their third daughter, Eliza, is thought to be the inspiration for Poe's poem, The Raven. Their childhoods were infused with interactions with such famous Americans as Chief Justice John Marshall, Horace Greeley, Daniel Webster, Erastus Brooks, and Henry Clay, who were frequent visitors at the White home.
