= Duff Green =

American politician (1791–1875)

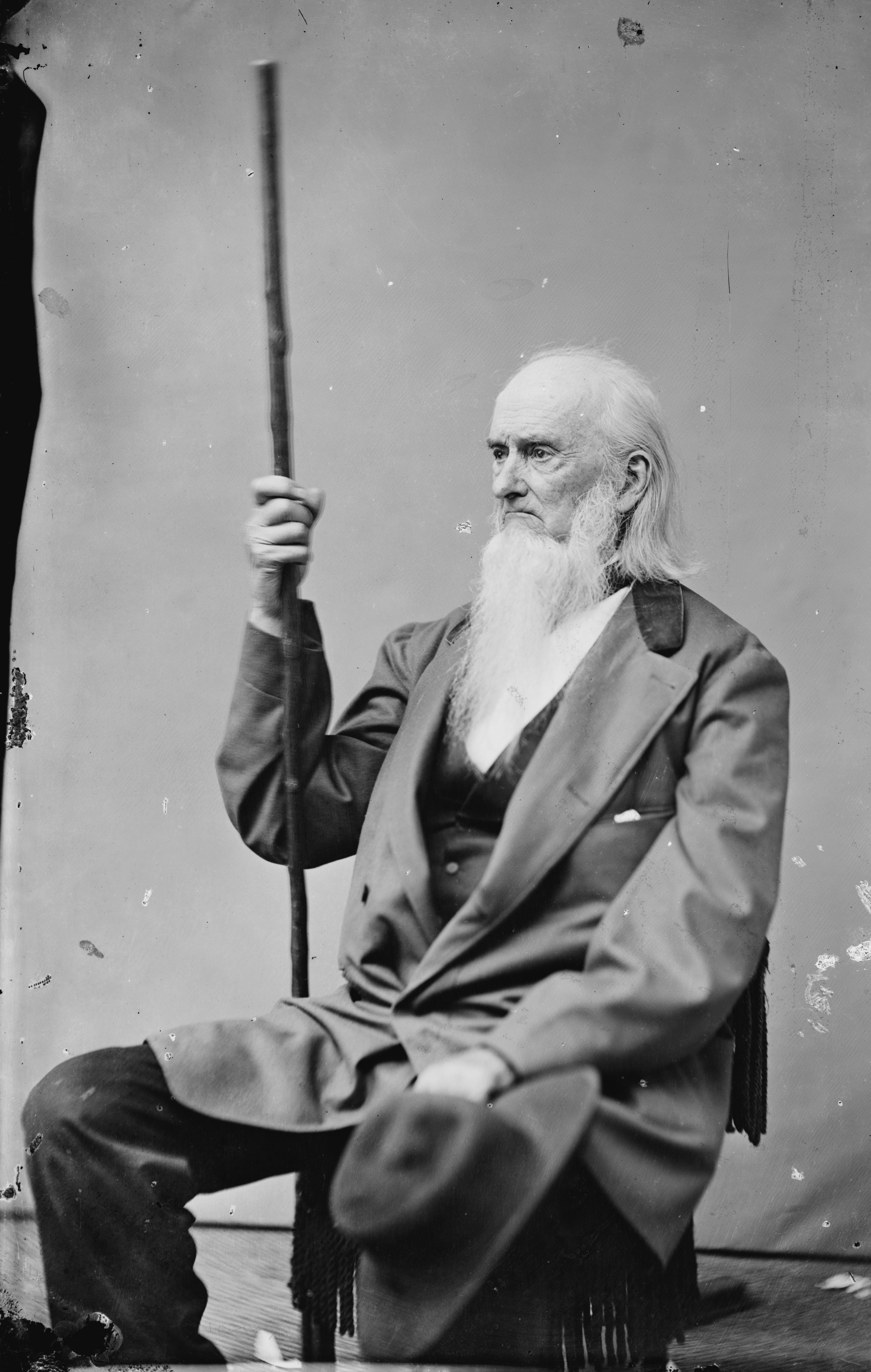
Duff Green

Duff Green (August 15, 1791 – June 10, 1875) was an American teacher, military leader, Democratic Party politician, journalist, author, diplomat and industrialist.

== Early life and education ==
Green, the son of William and Lucy Ann (Marshall) Green, was born August 15, 1791, in Woodford County, Kentucky. He was a school teacher in his native state of Kentucky and served with his commander, General William Henry Harrison, in the Kentucky militia in the War of 1812 and commanded the Missouri Brigade in the Indian Campaign, earning the rank brigadier general. Thereafter, he was known by many as General Duff Green. He then settled in Missouri, where he worked as a schoolmaster and practiced law. He was a member of the Missouri Constitutional Convention of 1820, and was elected to the Missouri House of Representatives in 1820 and to the Missouri State Senate in 1822, serving one term in each house. Becoming interested in journalism, he purchased and for two years edited the newspaper St Louis Enquirer.

== Career ==
In 1826, in Washington, DC, Green bought and later edited, the newspaper The United States Telegraph, which became the principal organ of Andrew Jackson's backers, helping him defeat John Quincy Adams in the presidential election of 1828. Upon Jackson's election to the presidency, the Telegraph became the principal organ of the administration, receiving printing patronage estimated at $50,000 a year. Green became one of the côterie of unofficial advisers of Jackson, known as the "Kitchen Cabinet", on which Jackson depended after the Petticoat affair.

During the quarrel between Jackson and Vice President John C. Calhoun, Green advocated Calhoun and, through the Telegraph, attacked the Jackson administration. In consequence, the Jackson administration revoked its patronage for the Telegraph during the spring of 1831. With the date of December 24, 1833, Adams records in his diary that James Blair "had knocked down and very severely beaten Duff Green, editor of the Telegraph...." Blair paid a "three hundred dollars fine for beating and breaking the bones" of Green. Green, however, continued to edit The United States Telegraph in the Calhoun interest until 1835 and endorsed Calhoun's opinions during the Nullification Crisis. Duff's daughter, Margaret Maria, was the mother of Calhoun's grandson, also named John Caldwell Calhoun. During his second term, Jackson replaced Calhoun with Martin Van Buren as vice president.

From 1835 to 1838, Green edited The Reformation, a radically partisan publication, devoted to free trade, states' rights, and the idea of "Manifest Destiny". In 1840, he established the Pilot in Baltimore to endorse the Harrison-Tyler ticket. Although endorsed initially by the Whig party, Green's controversial editorials concerning Catholic influence in American politics alienated his readers. Subscriptions decreased, and publication was suspended in 1841.

In 1841 to 1843, he was in Europe on behalf of the administration of President John Tyler and is said to have been instrumental in causing the appointment of Alexander Baring, Lord Ashburton, to negotiate in Washington on the boundary dispute between Maine and Canada.

In January 1844, Green established in New York City a short-lived journal, The Republic, to criticize the spoils system and to advocate free trade. In September 1844, Calhoun, now secretary of state, sent Green to Texas, ostensibly as consul at Galveston but actually, it seems, to report to the administration, which was then considering the question of the annexation of Texas, on the political situation in Texas and Mexico.

After the end of the Mexican–American War, Green was sent to Mexico in 1849 by President Zachary Taylor to negotiate concerning the money that in the treaty of Guadalupe Hidalgo, the United States had agreed to pay, and he saved his country a considerable sum by arranging for payment in exchange instead of in specie.

Subsequently, Green was engaged in railway building in Georgia and Alabama. He was also one of the founding associates in the incorporation of the New Mexican Railway Company. Duff was attracted to Dalton, Georgia in 1851 by the construction of the East Tennessee and Virginia Railroad from Knoxville, Tennessee to connect with the Western and Atlantic Railroad. He profited by making strategic land purchases. As his wealth grew, he donated land for many public projects in Dalton.

=== American Civil War ===
During the American Civil War, Green organized three iron manufacturing plants for production of iron, nails, horseshoes, and rails in support of the Confederacy. He and his son Ben also established the Dalton Arms Company in 1862.

==== Meeting with Abraham Lincoln in Virginia ====
On April 4, 1865, near the end of the war, Green reportedly met with US President Abraham Lincoln aboard a US Navy ship, USS Malvern, as the latter visited Virginia. Calling Green a friend, Lincoln greeted him amicably with a smile at first, but Green did not reciprocate in kind, refusing to shake Lincoln's hand when it was offered. In full view of US Navy admiral David Dixon Porter, Green reportedly then proceeded to verbally berate Lincoln, calling him a tyrant, a murderer, and accusing him of visiting Virginia only to gloat boastfully over the defeated Confederacy as well as accusing him of starting the Civil War. After listening patiently to Green berate him for a while, Lincoln's smile soon disappeared and, according to Porter's narrative, Lincoln became incensed, angrily condemning Green as a traitor for advocating the Confederacy:

Stop, you political tramp. You, the aider and abettor of those who have brought all this ruin upon your country, without the courage to risk your person in defense of the principles you profess to espouse! A fellow who stood by to gather up the loaves and fishes, if any should fall to you! A man who had no principles in the North, and took none South with him! A political hyena who robbed the graves of the dead, and adopted their language as his own! You talk of the North cutting the throats of the Southern people. You have all cut your own throats, and, unfortunately, have cut many of those of the North. Miserable impostor, vile intruder! Go, before I forget myself and the high position I hold! Go, I tell you, and don't desecrate this national vessel another minute!

Porter's account ends with Green, surprised and left speechless by Lincoln's rare bout of anger, quickly exiting the room and being removed from the ship. According to another eyewitness account, however, namely that of Lincoln's bodyguard William H. Crook, Lincoln listened impassively and said nothing until Green, having "exhausted himself," said, "I would like, sir, to go to my friends," prompting Lincoln to direct General Godfrey Weitzel, who was also present, to "please give Mr. Green a pass to go to his friends." Porter's account was 20 years after events, and an accompanying Union Army soldier, Thomas Donaldson said: "The account given by Admiral Porter was exaggerated."

=== Pardon by Andrew Johnson ===
After the war, Green was pardoned by President Andrew Johnson for his advocacy of the Confederacy, and paid a $20,000 fine.

== Later life and death ==
Green was one of the founding members of the Pennsylvania Fiscal Agency, incorporated November 1, 1859 in Pennsylvania. At the time, he gained 42,000 shares but paid with a bad check the 5% payment on only 5,000 shares. On March 26, 1864, Thomas C. Durant, the vice president of the Union Pacific Railroad Company purchased the corporation as a front construction company, whereby the directors and principal stock holders of the Union Pacific retained all construction profits. They then used the funds to purchase Union Pacific stock at par value and resell it on the open market for even greater profits. Durant changed the company name to the Crédit Mobilier of America. The scandal involving the sale of discounted Credit Mobilier stock to Congressional members voting for payment of exorbitant transcontinental railroad construction costs occurred during the Johnson administration but was revealed during the Grant administration.

Green died in Dalton, Georgia, a city that he had helped to build.

== Works ==
- Facts and Suggestions, Biographical, Historical, Financial and Political: addressed to the people of the United States. C. S. Westcott & Co.'s Union Printing Office, 1866
- Facts and Suggestions Relative to Finance & Currency, addressed to the President of the Confederate States. J. T. Paterson & Co., 1864
- How to Pay off the National Debt: regulate the value of money, and maintain stability in the values of property and labor. Claxton, Remsen & Haffelfinger, 1872

== Sources ==
- Thomas Hart Benton, Thirty Years View: A History of the Working of The American Government For Thirty Years from 1820 to 1850 (two volumes, New York, 1854–56)
- W. Stephen Belko, The Invincible Duff Green: Whig of the West (University of Missouri Press, 2006).
