= Adams v. Burke =

- Supreme Court of the United States

Decided December 8, 1873
- Full case name: Adams v. Burke
- Citations: 84 U.S. 453 (more) 17 Wall. 453; 21 L. Ed. 700; 1873 U.S. LEXIS 1384

Court membership
- Chief Justice vacant Associate Justices Nathan Clifford · Noah H. Swayne; Samuel F. Miller · David Davis; Stephen J. Field · William Strong; Joseph P. Bradley · Ward Hunt

Case opinions
- Majority: Miller, joined by Chase, Clifford, Davis, Field, Hunt
- Dissent: Bradley, joined by Swayne, Strong

Adams v. Burke, 84 U.S. (17 Wall.) 453 (1873), was a United States Supreme Court case in which the Court first elaborated on the exhaustion doctrine. According to that doctrine, a so-called authorized sale of a patented product (one made by the patentee or a person authorized by it to sell the product) liberates the product from the patent monopoly. The product becomes the complete property of the purchaser and "passes without the monopoly." The property owner is then free to use or dispose of it as it may choose, free of any control by the patentee. Adams is a widely cited, leading case. A substantially identical doctrine applies in copyright law and is known as the "first sale doctrine".

As the Supreme Court recently explained, in Kirtsaeng v. John Wiley & Sons, Inc., 133 S. Ct. 1351 (2013), the principle comes from early English common law of property, explained in Coke on Littleton early in the 17th century. Under the common law, if a man is possessed of a chattel (item of personal property) and he transfers his property in it to another, no restriction against the use or disposition of the chattel will be effective, for that would hinder trade and commerce – it would interfere with bargaining among men. If once a patented product was sold and allowed to enter the stream of commerce, if it could be subject to restrictions (perhaps secret) on its use or further disposition, businessmen would not be able to know whether transactions in the product were effective and business certainty would be greatly impaired.

== Factual background ==
In 1863, U.S. Patent No. 38,713 issued to the inventors Merrill and Horner for a coffin lid that permitted interested persons to view the name-plate and inscription of the decedent in the coffin, irrespective of whether the coffin cover is open or closed. In 1865 they assigned to Lockhart & Seelye of Cambridge, Massachusetts, the ownership of the patent in a circular area around Boston having a ten-mile radius. Adams, the plaintiff in this case, was the assignee of the patent in an area outside this circle which included the town of Natick, Massachusetts.

Burke, the defendant, was an undertaker doing business in Natick, Massachusetts, seventeen miles from Boston. Burke purchased some patented coffin lids from Lockhart & Seelye, who had manufactured them. Burke then took them to Natick (more than ten miles from Boston), and used them in his business. Adams then sued him.

== Trial court opinion ==
The circuit court for the district of Massachusetts dismissed the case. It said:

When a patented product passes lawfully into the hands of a purchaser without condition or restriction, it is no longer within the monopoly or under the protection of the patent act, but outside of it. ...It is clear that by such a sale the purchaser acquires an absolute title to the manufactured product which is the subject of a patent, and may deal with It in the same manner as if dealing with any other kind of property. He may use it, repair it, Improve upon it, or sell it. Subsequent purchasers acquire the same rights as the seller had, and may do with the article, or its materials, whatever the first purchaser could have lawfully done if he had not parted with the title.

== Supreme Court opinion ==
Adams appealed to the Supreme Court, which affirmed. The Court began by observing that this was a case of first impression in the Supreme Court although the governing principle had been involved in other patent cases. That principle was this:

[T]he sale by a person who has the full right to make, sell, and use . . . a machine carries with it the right to the use of that machine to the full extent to which it can be used in point of time. . . . [I]n the essential nature of things, when the patentee, or the person having his rights, sells a machine or instrument whose sole value is in its use, he receives the consideration for its use and he parts with the right to restrict that use. The article, in the language of the Court, passes without the limit of the monopoly. [citation omitted] That is to say the patentee or his assignee having in the act of sale received all the royalty or consideration which he claims for the use of his invention in that particular machine or instrument, it is open to the use of the purchaser without further restriction on account of the monopoly of the patentees.

Accordingly, the Court ruled that "we hold that in the class of machines or implements we have described, when they are once lawfully made and sold, there is no restriction on their use to be implied for the benefit of the patentee or his assignees or licensees."

Subsequent Supreme Court cases following the doctrine of the Adams case include:

- Motion Picture Patents Co. v. Universal Film Mfg. Co., 243 U.S. 502 (1917).
- Straus v. Victor Talking Machine Co., 243 U.S. 490 (1917).
- Ethyl Gasoline Corp. v. United States, 309 U.S. 436 (1940).
- United States v. Univis Lens Co., 316 U.S. 241 (1942).
- Aro Mfg. Co. v. Convertible Top Replacement Co., 365 U. S. 336 (1961).
- Quanta Computer, Inc. v. LG Electronics, Inc., 553 U.S. 617 (2008).

But see:

- United States v. General Electric Co., 272 U.S. 476 (1926).
- General Talking Pictures Corp. v. Western Electric Co., 304 U.S. 175 (1938).
