= Fujifilm Corp. v. Benun =

- Court: United States Court of Appeals for the Federal Circuit
- Full case name: Fujifilm Corporation, Plaintiff-Appellee, v. Jack C. Benun, and Jazz Products LLC, Polytech Enterprises LTD, and Polytech (Shenzhen) Camera Co. LTD., Defendant-Appellant
- Decided: May 27 2010
- Citations: 605 F.3d 1366; 95 U.S.P.Q.2d 1985

Case history
- Prior history: Case No. 2:05-CV-1863 (United States District Court for the District of New Jersey 2009) (finding that that defendants infringed patents owned by Fujifilm Corporation)

Holding
- The judgment of the United States District Court for the District of New Jersey that the defendants infringed patents owned by Fujifilm Corporation is affirmed.

Court membership
- Judges sitting: Paul Redmond Michel, Haldane Robert Mayer, Richard Linn

Case opinions
- Per curiam

Fujifilm Corp v. Benun, 605 F.3d 1366 (Fed. Cir. 2010) was a case in which the United States Court of Appeals for the Federal Circuit affirmed the judgment made by the United States District Court for the District of New Jersey that the defendants infringed patents owned by Fujifilm Corporation.

== Factual background ==
Fujifilm is the owner of patents in the design and production of single-use, disposable cameras, or lens-fitted film packages (LFFPs). After being used, a LFFP is taken by a customer to a film processor who opens the LFFP and processes the film. The empty LFFPs can be refurbished by a company by replacing the film as well as any broken or worn components. Defendant Polytech (Shenzhen) Camera Company (PC), a subsidiary of co-defendant Polytech Enterprises Ltd. (PE), operated a factory in China that refurbished LFFPs originally sold by Fujifilm outside the US. Defendant Jazz Products LLC, owned by defendant Jack C. Benun, purchased refurbished LFFPs from Polytech Camera to be sold in the US.

In 2005, Fujifilm successfully sued Jazz Photos, another company owned by Benun, for patent infringement and was awarded $30 million, forcing both Jazz and Benun to file for bankruptcy. Despite the district court's preliminary injunction enjoining the defendants from infringing, Jazz Products purchased about 1.4 million LFFPs made by Polytech and re-imported them into the US. In 2006, the district court found the defendants in contempt of the preliminary injunction, and approved $2 per infringing LFFP running royalty.

== Circuit Court Opinion ==
The defendants appealed to the Federal Circuit Court of Appeals and the Circuit Court waived one of the four issues presented by the defendants and rejected the other three.

=== Estoppel ===
The defendants contended that "the court invoked non-mutual collateral estoppel and precluded Polytech from presenting its permissible repair and first sale defenses on the basis of court proceedings to which Polytech was not a party." However, this argument was waived because it was not raised at the right time during the defendants' 50(a) motion for judgement as a matter of law and 50(b) post-trial motion.

=== Territoriality Requirement ===
In Quanta Computer, Inc. v. LG Electronics, Inc., the Supreme Court ruled that Intel selling chips to Quanta exhausted LG's patent rights. LG licensed Intel to use its patent, and the patent is practiced when Quanta combined Intel's chips with non-Intel hardware, triggering patent exhaustion. The defendants argued that the Quanta case eliminated the territoriality requirement, hence's Fujifilm's sales of LFFP outside the US exhausted its patent rights as well, allowing the defendants to refurbish and resell them in the US. However, because the Quanta case did not involve foreign sales, the Circuit Court rejected the defendants' argument.

=== Damage Unwarranted ===
The defendants contended that the running royalty of $2.00 per infringing LFFP and the $2.5 million lump sum are "excessive, punitive, and unsupported by substantial evidence." Based on factors such as the defendants' dependence on a Fujifilm license, Customs excluding infringing LFFPs, and the defendants' inability to separate the infringing LFFPs from the non-infringing ones, Fujifilm demonstrated that the jury could have reached a royalty rate as high as $2.21; and a similar logic applies as well for the lump sum award.

=== Contempt of Preliminary Order ===
The defendants challenged whether the court properly held them in contempt of a preliminary order enjoining importation of infringing LFFPs. They argued that 1) the contempt was not sufficiently supported by evidence of infringement, 2) the imported LFFPs were redesigned, and 3) Fujifilm's patent rights were terminated during the bankruptcy sale. The first two arguments were rejected based on fact witness reports and a statistical expert, and the third argument was waived because it was not raised in either the 50(a) or 50(b) motions.

=== Supreme Court Petition for Certiorari ===
In October 2010, Benun and his codefendants filed a petition for certiorari, asking the United States Supreme Court to review the Federal Circuit's holding that the authorized sale abroad of a patented article does not exhaust the patent holder's right to use the patent law to control the subsequent resale or use of the item sold. The Supreme Court denied the petition December 10, 2010.

== Related Cases ==
- Quanta Computer, Inc. v. LG Electronics, 128 S. Ct. 2109 (Supreme Court 2008).
- Omega v. Costco, 541 F. 3d 982 (9th Cir. 2008).

== See also ==
- Exhaustion Doctrine
