= Post-sale restraint =

A post-sale restraint, also termed a post-sale restriction, as those terms are used in United States patent law and antitrust law, is a limitation that operates after a sale of goods to a purchaser has occurred and purports to restrain, restrict, or limit the scope of the buyer's freedom to utilize, resell, or otherwise dispose of or take action regarding the sold goods. Such restraints have also been termed "equitable servitudes on chattels".

Support for the rule against enforcement of post-sale restraints has at times been rested on the common law's hostility to restraints on the alienation of chattels. "The right of alienation is one of the essential incidents of a right of general property in movables, and restraints upon alienation have been generally regarded as obnoxious to public policy, which is best subserved by great freedom of traffic in such things as pass from hand to hand. General restraint in the alienation of articles, things, chattels, except when a very special kind of property is involved, ... have been generally held void."

== Case law ==
=== Adams v. Burke ===
Perhaps the earliest US discussion of post-sales restraints occurs in Adams v. Burke, in which the US Supreme Court refused to find patent infringement when an undertaker — who purchased a patented coffin lid, and transported it outside the territory in which the manufacturer was licensed (the ten-mile radius surrounding Boston) — used the product to bury a client. The Court stated:

But in the essential nature of things, when the patentee, or the person having his rights, sells a machine or instrument whose sole value is in its use, he receives the consideration for its use and he parts with the right to restrict that use. The article, in the language of the Court, passes without the limit of the monopoly. That is to say the patentee or his assignee having in the act of sale received all the royalty or consideration which he claims for the use of his invention in that particular machine or instrument, it is open to the use of the purchaser without further restriction on account of the monopoly of the patentees.

=== Motion Picture Patents ===
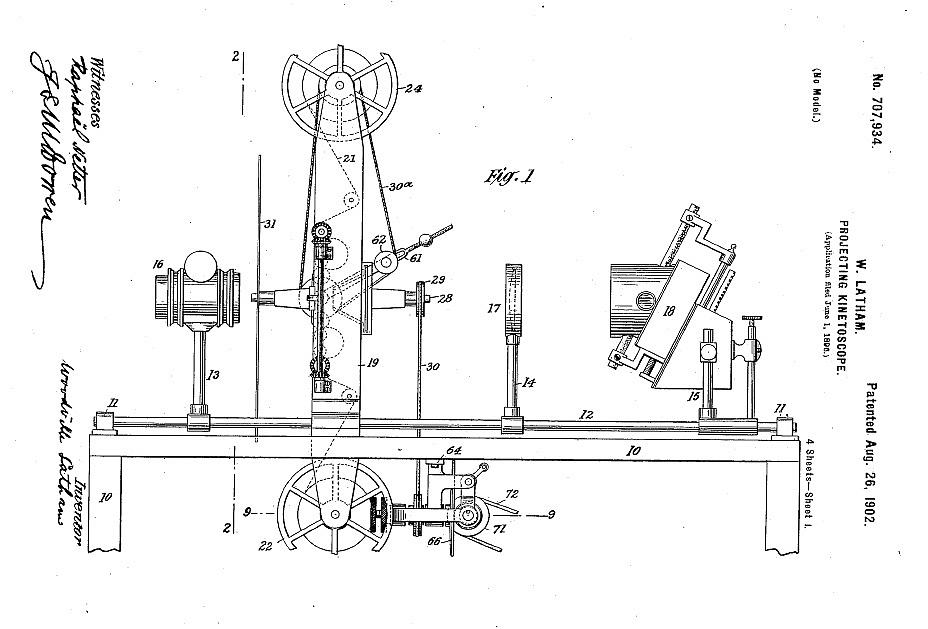
Projector involved in Mot. Pict. Pats. case

On the basis of this doctrine, in Motion Picture Patents Co. v. Universal Film Mfg. Co., the Supreme Court refused to enforce by way of a patent infringement suit against a downstream purchaser an agreement requiring that a patented film projector be used only with films licensed by the Motion Picture Patents Co., that the same agreement be imposed on downstream purchasers, and that the machine be sold with a plate affixed to it stating the same requirement.

=== Straus v. Victor ===
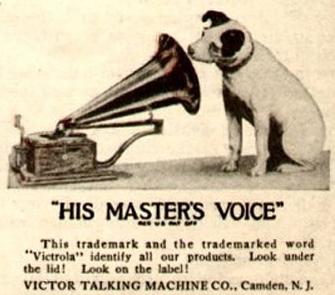

Contemporaneously, in Straus v. Victor Talking Machine Co., the Court refused to enforce a post-sale price-fixing restraint imposed on phonograph machines by means of an affixed "License Notice". The defendants, the proprietors of Macy's department store in New York, disregarded the notice and proceeded to cut prices. The patentee sought an injunction under the patent laws to compel obedience to the notice and, also, damages. The Court held that the case fell within the principle of Adams v. Burke and denied any relief. In so holding, the Court explained:

Courts would be perversely blind if they failed to look through such an attempt as this "License Notice" thus plainly is to sell property for a full price, and yet to place restraints upon its further alienation, such as have been hateful to the law from Lord Coke's day to ours, because obnoxious to the public interest.

=== 1926 GE case ===
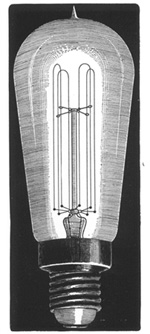

In 1926, in United States v. General Electric Co., the Supreme Court tried to make a bright-line distinction between post-sale restraints on patented goods, which the exhaustion doctrine did not allow, and limitations that a patentee imposed on the freedom of a manufacturing-licensee to sell goods manufactured under a limited license of a patent, which were permissible if "normally and reasonably adapted to secure pecuniary reward for the patentee's monopoly". It was well settled that, under the exhaustion doctrine, "where a patentee makes the patented article and sells it, he can exercise no future control over what the purchaser may wish to do with the article after his purchase. It has passed beyond the scope of the patentee's rights." But when a licensee is licensed only to make and sell goods in a particular field or through a particular channel of distribution, the patented goods so made are ordinarily subject to the limitations of the license, even when in the hands of a downstream purchaser. Accordingly, the Court upheld the legitimacy of price-fixing restrictions that GE imposed in its license to Westinghouse to manufacture light bulbs under GE's patents.

=== General Talking Pictures case ===
In General Talking Pictures Corp. v. Western Electric Co., the Supreme Court reaffirmed and expanded on the distinction made in the 1926 GE case between post-sale restraints and licenses containing a limitation on what the licensee was permitted to do. The Court upheld as legitimate so-called field-of-use limitations on the scope of patent licenses to make and sell amplifiers only in the "non-commercial" field against a licensee and its customer that made amplifiers and sold them into the commercial field.

=== Ethyl case ===
The bright-line distinction made in the 1926 GE case and in the General Talking Pictures case was blurred to some extent in the Supreme Court's 1940 decision in Ethyl Gasoline Corp. v. United States . In that case, Ethyl Gasoline Corporation had established an elaborate licensing program under its several patents on the fuel additive tetra-ethyl lead, a motor fuel containing tetra-ethyl lead, and a method of operating an automobile engine with fuel containing tetra-ethyl lead. Ethyl sold the fuel additive, and licensed purchasers to use it to practice the other patents. The licensing program fixed prices for the motor fuel and strictly limited the types of customer to which given licensees could sell the motor fuel. Ethyl emphasized to the Supreme Court the fact that while it sold the fuel subject to a post-sale restraint it licensed the other patents, which covered the manufacture of the fuel (by adding tetra-ethyl lead to ordinary gasoline) and the use of the fuel in automobile engines. The Supreme Court refused to make any distinctions among the different patents and struck the whole program down for improperly "regimenting" the industry.

=== Univis case ===
In United States v. Univis Lens Co., the patentee Univis sold unpatented lens blanks (partly finished blocks of glass comprising fused pieces of glass "of different refractive power") to "finishers", who further ground and polished them to manufacture patented lenses from them. The Supreme Court assumed that the patent was not "fully practiced"—i.e., infringed—"until the finishing licensee has ground and polished the blank". The finishing license was therefore a manufacturing license, and according to Univis, was within the protected dispensation of the General Talking Pictures case. But the Supreme Court held that even though the lens blanks were unpatented their sale by the patentee triggered exhaustion of the patent. The Court considered that the blanks "embodie[d] essential features of the patented device", they were not used for anything else, and that was sufficient to trigger the exhaustion doctrine. Since Univis's patent rights were exhausted by the sale of the lens blanks, the post-sale price and other restrictions that Univis imposed on the finishers were held illegal and in violation of the antitrust laws.

=== Parke, Davis case ===
In United States v. Parke, Davis & Co..

=== Schwinn case ===
In 1967, in United States v. Arnold, Schwinn & Co.,

=== GTE Sylvania case ===
In 1977, in Continental T.V., Inc. v. GTE Sylvania Inc., the Supreme Court overruled the Schwinn case's rule that post-sale restraints on mass-marketed goods were illegal per se under the antitrust laws. "Prompted by a decline in its market share to a relatively insignificant 1% to 2% of national television sales", Sylvania adopted a franchise distribution system. "Sylvania limited the number of franchises granted for any given area and required each franchisee to sell his Sylvania products only from the location or locations at which he was franchised." The Court found the case not distinguishable from Schwinn on any "principled basis". Nonetheless, it found overruling Schwinn preferable to following stare decisis. Pointing to the use of a "rule of reason" antitrust analysis for restrictive non-sale transactions, the Court explained, "We conclude that the distinction drawn in Schwinn between sale and nonsale transactions is not sufficient to justify the application of a per se rule in one situation and a rule of reason in the other." Seeing no demonstrable economic harm from Sylvania's conduct, the Court said that no antitrust violation should be found. In a footnote, the Court rejected the reliance in Schwinn on "the ancient rule against restraints on alienation". The opinion did not address post-sale restraints in patent cases.

=== Mallinckrodt case ===
In 1992, in Mallinckrodt, Inc. v. Medipart, Inc., the Federal Circuit held that post-sale restrictions (such as those in notices affixed to the patented product), other than ones fixing prices or imposing tie-ins, were to be governed by the rule stated in the 1926 GE case for manufacturing licenses, which is the same as the rule in the General Talking Pictures case. "The appropriate criterion" for determining the limits of a seller's freedom to impose restrictions, according to the Federal Circuit, "is whether [the patentee's or licensor's] restriction is reasonably within the patent grant, or whether the patentee has ventured beyond the patent grant and into behavior having an anticompetitive effect not justifiable under the rule of reason". In so ruling, the Federal Circuit said that any sweeping statements by the Supreme Court about property rights, and about post-sale restrictions on customers' use of patented products not being patent infringement, are mere obiter dicta that may properly be disregarded in cases not involving price-fixes or tie-ins.

=== Quanta case ===
In 2008, in Quanta Computer, Inc. v. LG Electronics, Inc., the Supreme Court held that the sale of patented microprocessors exhausted the patent monopoly on the microprocessors and also as to patents covering the combination of the patented microprocessors with other electronic components, where (as in Univis) the essential features of the invention were all contained in the microprocessors, i.e., the sold article embodies the essential features of the patented invention. In this case, Quanta's primary patents were on microprocessors, but it also had patents on products combining the patented microprocessors and other apparently conventional devices, such as PCs.) In so ruling, the Court reversed the judgment of the Federal Circuit holding that the licenses were effective under the Mallinckrodt doctrine.

=== Kirtsaeng case ===
In 2013, in Kirtsaeng v. John Wiley & Sons, Inc., the Supreme Court held that post-sale restraints imposed abroad by a company related to the US publisher could not be enforced by a US copyright infringement action that the publisher brought. In so ruling, the Court relied in substantial part on the "impeccable historic pedigree" of "the common law's refusal to permit restraints on the alienation of chattels". It also said that the "doctrine also frees courts from the administrative burden of trying to enforce restrictions upon difficult-to-trace, readily movable goods."

== See also ==
- Patent misuse
- Exhaustion doctrine under U.S. law
