= Rubber Co. v. Goodyear =

- Supreme Court of the United States

Argued January 17, 1868 Decided February 17, 1867
- Full case name: Rubber Company v. Goodyear
- Citations: 76 U.S. 788 (more) 6 Wall. 153; 18 L. Ed. 762

Case history
- Prior: Goodyear v. Providence Rubber Co., 10 F. Cas. 712 (C.C.D.R.I. 1864); 73 U.S. (6 Wall.) 153 (1867).

Court membership
- Chief Justice Salmon P. Chase Associate Justices James M. Wayne · Samuel Nelson; Robert C. Grier · Nathan Clifford; Noah H. Swayne · Samuel F. Miller; David Davis · Stephen J. Field

Case opinion
- Majority: Swayne, joined by a unanimous court

Rubber Co. v. Goodyear, 76 U.S. (9 Wall.) 788 (1869), is an early decision of the United States Supreme Court recognizing the right of a patent owner to license another person to practice the invention only in a limited field, and holding that such a licensee committed patent infringement when it made and sold products of the invention outside that field.

== Background ==
Goodyear's patented machine for making vulcanized rubber fabric

Charles Goodyear invented a process for "vulcanizing" rubber by heating it to a high temperature in the presence of sulfur and lead carbonate or another chemical, so that it was converted from a soft, sticky, gummy product (so-called India rubber) to a hard, resilient, elastic, flexible product (so-called vulcanized rubber). Goodyear was issued a patent on the process by which vulcanized India-rubber is manufactured and another patent for the product that the process produced.

In 1846, Goodyear granted what amounted to a royalty-free exclusive license to E.M. Chaffee, the assignor to the Providence Rubber Company (Providence), to "use" the patented "metallic gum-elastic composition for coating of cloths for the purpose of japanning, marbling, and variegate japanning, at his own establishment, but not to be disposed of to others for that purpose without the consent of said Goodyear." Further, the licensee was to pay Goodyear "at the rate of three cents per square yard of cloth japanned, marbled, or variegated as aforesaid." The license expressly provided that it did not "convey any right to make any contract with the government of the United States."

Providence subsequently made and sold to the government "army and navy equipments made of vulcanized India-rubber, including vulcanized India-rubber blankets, coats, cloaks, cloth, clothing, ponchos for army, navy, and other purposes" using the patented composition. Goodyear's assignees sued Providence for patent infringement, seeking an injunction and an accounting for profits.

== Ruling of circuit court ==
Supreme Court Justice Nathan Clifford, sitting as a circuit justice in the circuit court in Rhode Island, held that Providence infringed Goodyear's patent. Providence sought to defend on the ground that it was licensed to engage in the allegedly infringing conduct, but the court held that the license was "restricted to the manufacture of cloths to be japanned, marbled, and variegated, as therein described, and that it confers no authority to manufacture any of the articles specified in the bill of complaint." It therefore ruled against Providence, which then appealed to the Supreme Court.

== Ruling of Supreme Court ==
Justice Swayne delivered the unanimous opinion of the Court.

The Court described the limitations in the terms of the license to particular products and the exclusion of sales to the government, stating that the license "conveyed authority to this extent and nothing more." Accordingly, the Court held: "This defence [of license] cannot avail the defendants." The Court did not cite any case authority on this point.

The decree of the circuit court was therefore affirmed.

== Subsequent developments ==
=== General Talking Pictures ===
In General Talking Pictures Corp. v. Western Electric Co., 304 U.S. 175, 182 (1938) (upholding as legitimate field-of-use limitations on scope of patent licenses to make and sell amplifiers only in “non-commercial” field), affirmed on rehearing, 305 U.S. 124 (1938), the Supreme Court held that a patent owner could permissibly license another to manufacture the patented product only in a defined field (in that case, amplifiers for sale and use other than to movie theaters, so-called noncommercial use). The defendants were held patent infringers for making and selling the patented product to movie theaters. The Court stated (305 U.S. at 127):

The practice of granting licenses for a restricted use is an old one, see Rubber Company v. Goodyear, 9 Wall. 788, 799, 800 . . . So far as appears, its legality has never been questioned. The parties stipulated that "it is common practice where a patented invention is applicable to different uses, to grant written licenses to manufacture under United States Letters Patents restricted to one or more of the several fields of use permitting the exclusive or non-exclusive use of the invention by the licensee in one field and excluding it in another field."

=== Mallinckrodt ===
In Mallinckrodt, Inc. v. Medipart, Inc., 976 F.2d 700 (Fed. Cir. 1992), the Federal Circuit cited Goodyear incorrectly (conflating sales and licenses to manufacture) for support that it was established law that it was lawful to impose post-sale restrictions on the sale of patented products. The court said:

The practice of granting licenses for restricted use is an old one, see Rubber Company v. Goodyear, 76 U.S. 788, 9 Wall. 788, 799, 800. . . . So far as it appears, its legality has never been questioned.

But Mallinckrodt involved a sale subject to a restriction, while Goodyear involved a license to manufacture subject to a limitation as to field of use (as in General Talking Pictures).
