= Exhausted combination doctrine =

Doctrine of US patent law

The exhausted combination doctrine, also referred to as the doctrine of the Lincoln Engineering case, was the doctrine of U.S. patent law that when an inventor invents a new, unobvious device and seeks to patent not merely the new device but also the combination of the new device with a known, conventional device with which the new device cooperates in the conventional and predictable way in which devices of those types have previously cooperated, the combination is unpatentable as an "exhausted combination" or "old combination". The doctrine is also termed the doctrine of the Lincoln Engineering case because the United States Supreme Court explained the doctrine in its decision in Lincoln Engineering Co. v. Stewart-Warner Corp. This doctrine has been considered abrogated by the US Congress in 1952, when it passed the 1952 Patent Act.

== The Lincoln Engineering decision ==
In Lincoln Engineering, the inventor invented a new and improved coupling device to attach a nozzle to a grease gun. The patent, however, claimed the whole combination of grease gun, nozzle, and coupling. The Supreme Court stated that "the improvement of one part of an old combination gives no right to claim that improvement in combination with other old parts which perform no new function in the combination". It then concluded that the inventor's "effort, by the use of a combination claim, to extend the monopoly of his invention of an improved form of chuck or coupler to old parts or elements having no new function when operated in connection with the coupler renders the claim void."

This way of claiming an invention was termed “overclaiming,” because it inflated the royalty base for licensing and potentially effectuated a tie-in by means of which the patentee required users, for example, to purchase not only the couplings but the whole grease gun as well in order to use the invention.

== Is the Lincoln Engineering doctrine obsolete? ==
The Federal Circuit held in 1984 that this doctrine is outdated and no longer reflects the law. In effect, the Federal Circuit overruled the Supreme Court on this point—or claimed that the passage of the 1952 patent recodification law had done so.

In its decision in Quanta Computer, Inc. v. LG Electronics, Inc., however, the Supreme Court seems to have assumed without any discussion that its old precedents such as Lincoln Engineering (uncited in the Quanta opinion) are still in force, as least with regard to the exhaustion doctrine. In Quanta, the Court considered the sale of a patented microprocessor to "exhaust" not only the patent on the microprocessor but the patent on a conventional personal computer (PC) containing the microprocessor, since the PC patent had essentially the same inventive concept (or departure from the prior art) as the microprocessor patent.

After 1984 it appeared that it was possible to obtain patents on old combinations, for example not only a new motor but also an otherwise conventional disc drive containing the new motor. It has also been held that the sale of the motor, in such a case, does not exhaust the patent on the disc drive containing the new motor. Hence, a purchaser of the motor who incorporated it into a disk drive would infringe the disk drive patent. It is now uncertain whether such patents are valid. In any event, the Quanta decision appears to hold that the exhaustion doctrine shields from infringement liability the foregoing motor purchaser that incorporates the motor into a disk drive.

== Exhausted combinations and nonstatutory subject matter ==
Claiming a computer-related advance as an exhausted combination may provide a way to prevent the claimed advance from being classified as nonstatutory subject matter under section 101 of the US patent law. Placing a process that fails the machine-or-transformation test in a machine environment may overcome the absence of implementation by a specific machine, as required by In re Bilski and the Supreme Court decisions on which it is based. (The successfulness of this expedient depends on acceptance of the Federal Circuit's abolition of the exhausted combination doctrine.)

For example, the form of the processes claimed in Diamond v. Diehr, Parker v. Flook, and Gottschalk v. Benson may appropriately be compared. In Diehr, the claim is to “a method of operating a rubber-molding press” and the claim contains at least minimal references to the press and other apparatus. In Flook, the claim is to a "method for updating the value of at least one alarm limit," where an “’alarm limit’ is a number.” The claim does not say anything about a reaction vessel or even temperature measuring devices. In Benson, the claim is to “a data processing method for converting binary coded decimal number representations into binary number representations.” One claim mentions a reentrant shift register and the other claim mentions no apparatus at all. In Flook, the claim could have instead been to “a method of operating a hydrocracking plant wherein hydrocarbon feedstock is placed into a chemical reactor, heat is applied, etc.” The claim, although to an exhausted combination, would have required apparatus as did that in the Diehr case. Similarly, the claim in Benson could have been to a method of operating a telephone switch box or perhaps even a method of providing binary-coded-decimal numerical signals to a binary-coded operating device. Again, by providing a mechanical environment, even though it was an exhausted combination, the claims drafter might have avoided the holding of nonstatutory subject matter. It is possible that careful claims drafting techniques will succeed in elevating form over substance, to avoid the impact of the machine-or-transformation test.

The preceding analysis may have been overtaken by the Supreme Court's 2014 decision in Alice v. CLS Bank. In that case the Court confirmed and extended the legal analysis of its prior decisions in Parker v. Flook and Mayo v. Prometheus to claimed inventions involving implementations of computer algorithms, methods of doing business, and other methods of organizing human activity. The form of analysis that these cases dictate is that the presence of a machine, in particular a programmed digital computer, is not enough without more to assure patent eligibility. Rather, the implementation of the underlying idea must embody an "inventive concept." The inventive concept must provide "something extra" that extends beyond the algorithm or other idea, if an otherwise patent-ineligible claim is to be saved from patent ineligibility—according to these cases and recent lower court decisions that follow in their wake.

== See also ==
- Exhaustion doctrine under U.S. law
