= The John Marshall Journal of Information Technology and Privacy Law =

- Discipline: Law review
- Language: English
- Edited by: Michelle Carey

Publication details
- Former names: Software Law Journal, The John Marshall Journal of Computer and Information Law
- History: 1988-2019
- Publisher: John Marshall Law School (United States)
- Frequency: Quarterly

Standard abbreviations
- Bluebook: J. Marshall J. Info. Tech. & Privacy L.
- ISO 4: John Marshall J. Inf. Technol. Priv. Law

Indexing
- CODEN: JCJIEI
- ISSN: 1078-4128
- LCCN: 94657486
- OCLC no.: 30365829

Links
- Journal homepage

The John Marshall Journal of Information Technology and Privacy Law was a law review published by a student group at the John Marshall Law School (Chicago). it was dedicated to addressing cutting edge topics in information technology and privacy law. The journal was cited by a recent decision of the Supreme Court of the United States in Quanta Computer, Inc. v. LG Electronics, Inc.

== History ==
The journal was originally established as the Software Law Journal by Michael D. Scott. In 1987, Scott invited the John Marshall Law School to assume editorial control of the journal, because of the school's commitment to education in the area of information technology law. In 1994, Scott then invited the school to merge the Software Law Journal with the Computer Law Journal, and to assume editorial control and publishing rights of the new journal. The journal name was The John Marshall Journal of Computer & Information Law between 1995 and 2013 and The John Marshall Journal of Information Technology & Privacy Law after 2014. The last issue was Volume 34, Issue 1 in 2019.
