= United States v. General Electric Co. =

- Supreme Court of the United States

Argued October 13, 1926 Decided November 23, 1926
- Full case name: United States v. General Electric Co.
- Citations: 272 U.S. 476 (more) 47 S. Ct. 192; 71 L. Ed. 362; 1926 U.S. LEXIS 974

Case history
- Prior: 15 F.2d 715 (N.D. Ohio 1925) (affirmed)

Holding
- A patentee who has granted a single license to a competitor to manufacture the patented product may lawfully fix the price at which the licensee may sell the product.

Court membership
- Chief Justice William H. Taft Associate Justices Oliver W. Holmes Jr. · Willis Van Devanter; James C. McReynolds · Louis Brandeis; George Sutherland · Pierce Butler; Edward T. Sanford · Harlan F. Stone

Case opinion
- Majority: Taft, joined by unanimous

United States v. General Electric Co., 272 U.S. 476 (1926), is a decision of the United States Supreme Court holding (per Chief Justice Taft) that a patentee who has granted a single license to a competitor to manufacture the patented product may lawfully fix the price at which the licensee may sell the product.

== Background ==
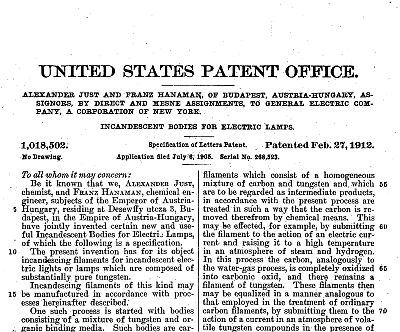
GE's patent on the tungsten filament lamp, US Pat 1,018,502 – one of the patents that the Supreme Court said completely covered the manufacture and sale of incandescent light bulbs

GE owned three patents that “cover[ed] completely the making of the modern electric lights with the tungsten filaments.” GE accounted for 69% of total manufacture and sale of incandescent light bulbs, and Westinghouse, 16%. GE licensed Westinghouse to manufacture and sell light bulbs on the condition that Westinghouse should sell at prices that GE fixed and changed at its discretion.

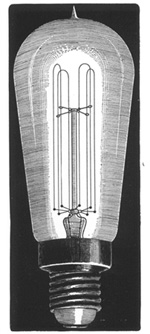
_{GE tungsten filament lamp embodying the invention of US Pat 1,018,502 – one of those involved in the 1926 US v GE litigation}

== Supreme Court opinion ==
The Court pointed out that GE had not sold the light bulbs to Westinghouse but rather had granted Westinghouse a license to manufacture and sell the bulbs under GE’s patents. It was well settled that, under the exhaustion doctrine, “where a patentee makes the patented article and sells it, he can exercise no future control over what the purchaser may wish to do with the article after his purchase. It has passed beyond the scope of the patentee's rights.” On the other hand, “the question is a different one…when we consider what a patentee who grants a license to one to make and vend the patented article may do in limiting the licensee in the exercise of the right to sell.” If all that the patentee does is grant a license to make, the Court said, the licensee only gets an implied license to use the article and not one to sell it. That raises the question of what happens if the patentee also licenses sale:

If the patentee goes further and licenses the selling of the articles, may he limit the selling by limiting the method of sale and the price? We think he may do so provided the conditions of sale are normally and reasonably adapted to secure pecuniary reward for the patentee's monopoly. One of the valuable elements of the exclusive right of a patentee is to acquire profit by the price at which the article is sold. The higher the price, the greater the profit, unless it is prohibitory. When the patentee licenses another to make and vend, and retains the right to continue to make and vend on his own account, the price at which his licensee will sell will necessarily affect the price at which he can sell his own patented goods. It would seem entirely reasonable that he should say to the licensee, "Yes, you may make and sell articles under my patent, but not so as to destroy the profit that I wish to obtain by making them and selling them myself." He does not thereby sell outright to the licensee the articles the latter may make and sell, or vest absolute ownership in them. He restricts the property and interest the licensee has in the goods he makes and proposes to sell.

That is the core of the opinion in the case, and the rule for which the GE case is usually cited today: the patentee may impose any conditions in a manufacturing license that “are normally and reasonably adapted to secure pecuniary reward for the patentee’s monopoly.”

The decision also upheld price fixing restrictions that GE imposed in agreements with agents for sale of bulbs that GE had manufactured. The Court ruled: “The owner of an article, patented or otherwise, is not violating the common law or the Anti-Trust Act by seeking to dispose of his articles directly to the consumer and fixing the price by which his agents transfer the title from him directly to such consumer.”

== Subsequent developments ==
The U.S. Department of Justice has been trying to overturn the 1926 GE decision almost since it was first handed down, and has twice seen it upheld by an equally divided 4–4 Supreme Court.

Subsequent decisions of the Court, however, have repeatedly circumscribed the scope of the dispensation that the 1926 GE case offers. It does not apply when several patentees pool their patents or when the patentee has multiple licensees. It does not apply when the patentee-licensor is not itself a manufacturer licensing competitive manufacturers. It does not apply to a price-fix on an unpatented product made by a patented machine or patented method.

The United States Court of Appeals for the Federal Circuit has continued to rely on what is termed, above, the core of the opinion. In Mallinckrodt, Inc. v. Medipart, Inc., the Federal Circuit relied on GE as the basis for its ruling that the patentee’s post-sale restrictions were not prohibited under the exhaustion doctrine. The Federal Circuit’s Quanta decision relied for its rationale on Mallinckrodt, and thus on GE. But the Supreme Court’s reversal of that decision in Quanta Computer, Inc. v. LG Electronics, Inc. has created uncertainty about the continuing authority of this line of precedent and has left this area of law unsettled.

In its initial brief in the Quanta case, as amicus curiae, the United States had pointed to the "seeming anomaly" between the two lines of authority that the GE case addresses. One line is represented by the Supreme Court's "exhaustion" cases such as United States v. Univis Lens Co. and Quanta. Another line is reflected by such decisions and GE and General Talking Pictures Corp. v. Western Electric Co. The Mallinckrodt case seemed to expand the scope of the second line of authority at the expense of the first, but now Quanta may be reversing the direction of expansion. This area of law may thus remain unsettled for several years.

Early in 2015, the Federal Circuit called for en banc briefing and argument of whether the Mallinckrodt case should be overruled, in light of Quanta. In February 2016, the Federal Circuit, in a 10–2 decision, reaffirmed Mallinckrodt.
