= Ethyl Gasoline Corp. v. United States =

- Supreme Court of the United States

Argued March 1, 4, 1940 Decided March 25, 1940
- Full case name: Ethyl Gasoline Corporation, et al. v. United States
- Citations: 309 U.S. 436 (more) 60 S. Ct. 618; 84 L. Ed. 852; 1940 U.S. LEXIS 1265; 44 U.S.P.Q. 614

Case history
- Prior: United States v. Ethyl Gasoline Corp., 27 F. Supp. 959 (S.D.N.Y. 1939); probable jurisdiction noted, 60 S. Ct. 296 (1939).

Court membership
- Chief Justice Charles E. Hughes Associate Justices James C. McReynolds · Harlan F. Stone; Owen Roberts · Hugo Black; Stanley F. Reed · Felix Frankfurter; William O. Douglas · Frank Murphy

Case opinion
- Majority: Stone, joined by Hughes, Black, Reed, Frankfurter, Douglas, Murphy
- McReynolds and Roberts took no part in the consideration or decision of the case.

Ethyl Gasoline Corp. v. United States, 309 U.S. 436 (1940), was a decision of the United States Supreme Court that limited the doctrine of the Court's 1938 decision in General Talking Pictures Corp. v. Western Electric Co. Beginning with the 1926 decision in United States v. General Electric Co., the Supreme Court made a sharp distinction between (i) post-sale restraints that a patentee imposed on purchasers of a patented product and (ii) restrictions (limitations) that a patentee imposed on a licensee to manufacture a patented product: the former being illegal and unenforceable under the exhaustion doctrine while the latter were generally permissible under a lenient "rule of reason." Thus, under the General Talking Pictures doctrine, a patent holder may permissibly license others to manufacture and then sell patented products in only a specified field (market), such as only a particular type of product made under the patent or only a particular category of customer for the patented product. The Ethyl decision held, however, that a patent licensing and distribution program based on both the sale of a patented product and licenses to manufacture a related product was subject to ordinary testing under the antitrust laws, and accordingly was illegal when its effect was to "regiment" an entire industry.

== Background ==
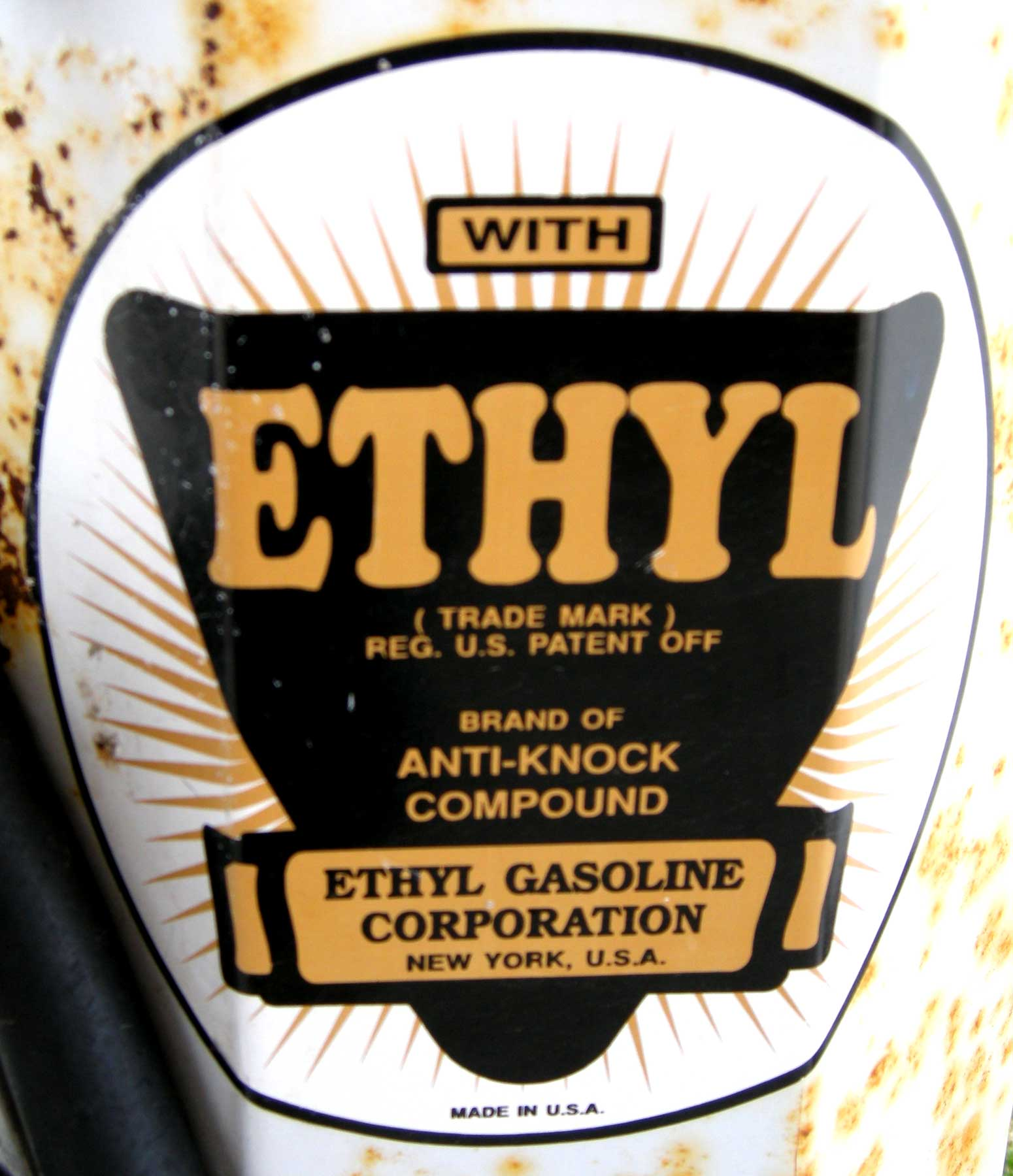
Sign on an antique gasoline pump advertising tetra-ethyl lead

Ethyl owned several patents on tetra-ethyl lead, an anti-knock fuel additive, and on its utilization: two patents on the chemical itself, a patent on a motor fuel—gasoline containing tetra-ethyl lead, and a patent on a method of using the fuel in an automobile engine.

Ethyl established an elaborate licensing program under its several patents: Ethyl sold the fuel additive, and licensed purchasers to use it to practice the other patents. The licensing program fixed prices for the motor fuel and strictly limited the types of customer (i.e., no price-cutters) to which given licensees could sell the motor fuel. Ethyl's program "controls the business of the major part of those engaged in manufacturing and distributing [gasoline] in the United States." Ethyl licensed almost every US refiner and its licensees refined 88% of the gasoline in the US. It was Ethyl's "long established practice . . . to refuse to grant licenses to jobbers who cut prices or refuse to conform to the marketing policies and posted prices of the major refineries or the market leaders among them."

The United States sued Ethyl for violating the antitrust laws, and Ethyl claimed that its patents exempted its conduct.

== Ruling of Supreme Court ==
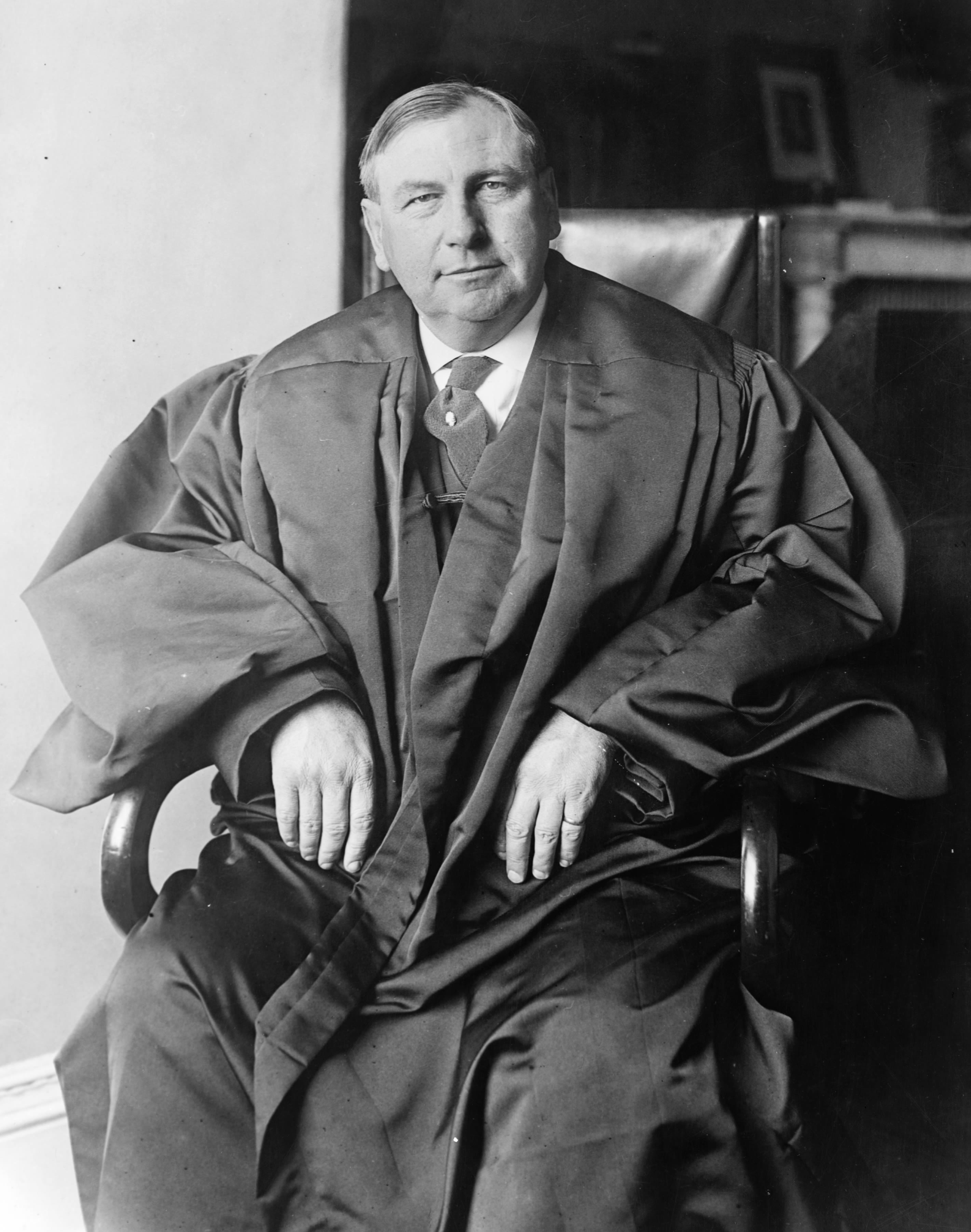
Chief Justice Harlan F. Stone

Ethyl emphasized to the Supreme Court the fact that, while it sold the fuel to refiners subject to a post-sale restraint, it licensed the other patents, which covered the manufacture of the fuel (by adding tetra-ethyl lead to ordinary gasoline) and the method of using the fuel in automobile engines. Ethyl argued that the licensed patents and the manufacturing brought the case within the shelter of the General Talking Pictures doctrine. Ethyl urged that the various restrictions were "all reasonably necessary for the commercial development of [its] patents and for insuring a financial return from them, and are therefore within its patent monopoly." Further, they "are appropriate and reasonably adapted to the maintenance of the quality of the product and for the protection of the public in its use of a product containing a dangerous poison."

The Supreme Court, in an opinion written by Chief Justice Harlan F. Stone, refused without dissent to make any distinctions among the different patents and struck the whole program down for improperly “regimenting” the industry in violation of the antitrust laws.

The Court said that Ethyl used its patents and licensing program to obtain

the power to exclude at will from participation in the nationwide market for lead-treated motor fuel all of the 12,000 motor fuel jobbers of the country, by refusing to license any of the 1,000 unlicensed jobbers, or by cancelling, as it may at will, the licenses of any of the 11,000 licensed jobbers.

It then unlawfully

exercise[d] that power in such manner as to control the patented commodity in the hands of the licensed jobbers who had purchased it, [and] their actions with respect to it in ways not within the limits of the patent monopoly, and conspicuously among such controls which the Sherman law prohibits and the patent law does not sanction is the regulation of prices and the suppression of competition among the purchasers of the patented articles.

Relying on the exhaustion doctrine and citing Adams v. Burke, the Court stated:

By its sales to refiners, it relinquishes its exclusive right to use the patented fluid and it relinquishes to the licensed jobbers its exclusive rights to sell the lead-treated fuel by permitting the licensed refiners to manufacture and sell the fuel to them. And, by the authorized sales of the fuel by refiners to jobbers, the patent monopoly over it is exhausted, and, after the sale, neither [Ethyl] nor the refiners may longer rely on the patents to exercise any control over the price at which the fuel may be resold.

The Court found this violative of the antitrust laws:

[Ethyl] has established the marketing of the patented fuel in vast amounts on a nationwide scale through the 11,000 jobbers and, at the same time, by the leverage of its licensing contracts resting on the fulcrum of its patents, it has built up a combination capable of use, and actually used, as a means of controlling jobbers' prices and suppressing competition among them. It seems plain that this attempted regulation of prices and market practices of the jobbers with respect to the fuel purchased, for which [Ethyl] could not lawfully contract, cannot be lawfully achieved by entering into contracts or combinations through the manipulation of which the same results are reached by the exercise of the power which they give to control the action of the purchasers. Such contracts or combinations, which are used to obstruct the free and natural flow in the channels of interstate commerce of trade even in a patented article, after it is sold by the patentee or his licensee, are a violation of the Sherman Act.

The Court found it particularly objectionable that Ethyl exploited its patents by fixing the prices on which gasoline was sold, which was not the product that Ethyl manufactured and sold. "The licensing conditions are thus not used as a means of stimulating the commercial development and financial returns of the patented invention which is licensed, but for the commercial development of the business of the refiners and the exploitation of a second patent monopoly not embraced in the first."
