= Field-of-use limitation =

Provision in a patent license

A field-of-use limitation is a provision in a patent license that limits the scope of what the patent owner authorizes a manufacturing licensee (that is, a licensee that manufactures a patented product or performs a patented process) to do in relation to the patent, by specifying a defined field of use—that is, a defined field of permissible operation by the licensee. In addition to affirmatively specifying the field of use, the license may negatively specify a field or fields, by specifying fields of use from which the licensee is excluded.

By way of example, such a license might authorize a licensee to manufacture patented engines only for incorporation into trucks, or to manufacture a chemical only for sale to farmers (as contrasted with home gardeners). If the licensee exceeded the scope of the licensee, it would commit patent infringement. More generally, this kind of license permits the licensee to use the patented invention in some, but not all, possible ways in which the invention could be exploited. In an exclusive field-of-use license the licensee is the only person authorized to use the invention in the field of the license.

Field-of-use limitations in patent licenses may raise antitrust issues when such arrangements are used to allocate markets or create cartels.

== USA case law ==
The US Supreme Court held such arrangements legitimate in General Talking Pictures Corp. v. Western Electric Co. By way of example, such a license might authorize a licensee to manufacture patented engines only for incorporation into trucks (the "truck field"), or to manufacture such engines only for sale to farmers (the "field of distribution to farmers"). If the licensee exceeded the scope of the licensee, it would commit patent infringement.

The doctrine of the General Talking Pictures case does not apply to a patent owner's sale (or its licensee's sale) of a product to a customer that imposes a restriction on what the customer may subsequently do with the product. Such sales are governed by the “exhaustion doctrine,” rather than the General Talking Pictures doctrine. Enforced with fines and often much bad publicity.

Furthermore, when field-of-use licensing is used to create a horizontal cartel by which product markets are allocated among what would otherwise be competitive licensees, the General Talking Pictures doctrine does not shield the arrangement from the antitrust laws. In Hartford-Empire Co. v. United States, such a cartel based on patents was condemned as an antitrust violation. In United States v. Ciba Geigy Corp., the court found an antitrust violation as to patent licenses that restricted use of purchased drug chemicals but no violation as to licenses that limited the use of the same chemicals by licensees manufacturing them.

== Free software licences ==
It has been argued that field-of-use limitations are inconsistent with W3C standards and with the GNU General Public License.

== See also ==
- Exhaustion doctrine
