= JVC Kenwood Corp. v. Nero, Inc. =

- Court: United States Court of Appeals for the Federal Circuit
- Full case name: JVC Kenwood Corp. v. Nero, Inc.
- Decided: August 17, 2015
- Citations: 797 F.3d 1039; 2015 U.S. App. LEXIS 14402; 116 U.S.P.Q.2d 1255

Case history
- Prior history: 966 F.Supp.2d 1003 (C.D. Cal. 2013)

Court membership
- Judges sitting: Pauline Newman, Timothy B. Dyk, Jimmie V. Reyna

Case opinions
- Majority: Newman, joined by a unanimous court

JVC Kenwood Corp. v. Nero, Inc., 797 F.3d 1039, 2015 U.S. App. LEXIS 14402 (Fed. Cir. Aug. 17, 2015), is a 2015 decision of the United States Court of Appeals for the Federal Circuit concerning the rights of end users who purchase products subject to fair, reasonable, and nondiscriminatory (FRAND) licensing under an industry-wide patent pool of standards-essential patents, and of suppliers of software to the end users. The Federal Circuit held that, where the patent holder had authorized sales to end users of optical discs compliant with the standard, which embodied the patents' essential features and were reasonably intended only to be used to practice the patents, the patent owner had no direct infringement claim against the end users without proof that the end-users were using unlicensed discs. The patent holder therefore had no claim for contributory infringement or induced infringement against a software company for selling software to the end users for use with the licensed discs. The decision is said to be an important one for clarifying the rights of downstream users and their suppliers in the context of patent pools and FRAND licensing.

== Background ==
JVC Kenwood Corporation sued Nero, Inc. and Arcsoft, Inc. for contributory and induced infringement (so-called indirect infringement) of six JVC patents on various uses of DVD and Blu-ray optical discs. The charge of indirect infringement is based on Nero's sale of software to end users of DVD and Blu-ray discs, who purchased licensed discs and then allegedly directly infringed the JVC patents by using Nero's software. The software helps users burn and play optical discs on their computers. The district court summarized JVC's infringement theory as follows:

JVC's theory of infringement rests on the compliance of Nero's software with the same DVD and Blu-ray standards deemed essential to the manufacture, sale, and use of the licensed DVD and Blu-ray optical discs. This theory states that each patent is essential to playing, copying, and recording data on an optical disc compliant with the DVD or Blu-ray standard. The Nero software must practice the patents because the Nero software is used in conjunction with standards-compliant DVD or Blu-ray optical discs.

=== JVC's patents and their alleged infringement ===
Six JVC patents were involved, all directed to optical discs and structures, methods, or systems used with optical discs: U.S. Patent No. 6,141,491 (the '491 patent), No. 5,535,008 (the '008 patent), No. 6,522,692 (the '692 patent), No. 6,212,329 (the '329 patent), No. 6,490,404 (the '404 patent), and No. 6,788,881 (the '881 patent).

The '491 and '008 patents relate to "jump reproduction"–e.g., fast-forwarding, fast-rewinding, etc.–through moving picture data that is stored on a disc in a coded and compressed format. The specifications of these patents state: "An object of the present invention is to provide a recording medium, a reproduction method and a reproduction system, which are suitable for jump reproducing video data coded with high efficiency by an MPEG method or the like." JVC asserted that when end-users use Nero software with blank optical discs to record moving picture data, they directly infringe these patents by practicing the claimed "method of recording moving picture data on a recording medium."

The '692 and '329 patents relate to regional and parental controls on content-bearing optical discs. The claimed methods control whether certain kinds of content, such as a movie on an optical disc, should be decoded and played. For example, these methods permit preventing "R" rated content from being played. JVC asserted that when an end-user uses Nero software to perform the parental/regional control functions, the end-user directly infringes these patents.

The '404 patent claims a method and apparatus for editing data on a rewritable optical disc. JVC asserted that when an end-user uses Nero software to record to a blank rewritable optical disc, the end-user directly infringes the patent.

The '881 patent relates to editing audio data recorded on a rewritable optical disc. JVC asserted that when an end user uses Nero software to store data to an optical disc, the end user directly infringes the patent "by making (creating) a writable storage medium (recorded optical disc)."

For all six patents, JVC asserted that since Nero's software customers are direct infringers, Nero is liable for induced or contributory infringement.

=== The standard and patent pools ===
The optical discs and methods of recording and playing them involved in this case all comply with an industry-wide standard for DVD and Blu-ray optical discs. There are two patent licensing pools for optical disc technology: the DVD Patent Licensing Group (also called DVD6C), and One Blue LLC for Blu-ray technology. Each pool uses standard licensing agreements with patentees contributing patents to the pool and manufacturers taking licenses from the pool. These licenses cover only patents deemed essential to compliance with the standard. That is, the patents are infringed when complying with the standard.

The licenses from the pool provide manufacturers with a nonexclusive license "to make, have made, use, import, offer to sell, sell and otherwise dispose of DVD Products" under the patents. Nero has agreed to make only standard-compliant products, so that its software presumably causes recording and playing of optical discs as claimed in the patents.

=== District court ruling ===
The district court accepted JVC's position that the patents' claims to software-implemented methods are embodied by the discs, stating: "If these claims are essential to the licensed DVD and Blu-ray optical discs, then those discs must embody the elements described in those claims."

The district court did not accept JVC's theory as to liability. It held that the direct infringement of the patented systems, methods, and apparatuses, as "generally alleged" by JVC, is negated by the "extensive licensing program, both as part of the DVD6C and One Blue patent pools as well as through JVC's individual licensing program." The court observed that licensees cannot be infringers.

The district court noted that JVC made no showing that the end-users were using unlicensed discs and it was shown that an extensive licensing program existed for optical discs. JVC based its infringement theory solely on the standards and the essentiality of JVC's patents to compliance with the standards. " Therefore, without specific allegations and evidence showing [end-user] use of unlicensed optical discs, Nero has established a complete defense to all of JVC's allegations of infringement under the patents." Accordingly, the court granted summary judgment against JVC, holding first that it is "barred from asserting claims of direct infringement against end users for use of Nero software with DVD and Blu-ray optical discs made or sold by a party whose products have been expressly released from claims of infringement by JVC with regard to the patents." The district court then held that because there was no direct infringement, Nero cannot be liable for indirect infringement.

The court also held:

End users' use of Nero software with DVD and Blu-ray optical discs licensed under the patents is subject to the complete affirmative defense of patent exhaustion with regard to infringement of the patents.

== Ruling of Federal Circuit ==
The Federal Circuit. in an opinion by Judge Newman (rest of panel: Dyke and Reyna, JJ.), held that summary judgment was properly granted on the first basis, but facts material to the issue of patent exhaustion were insufficiently developed to warrant summary judgment on the second ground.

=== Direct infringement and license ===
The Federal Circuit agreed with the district court that, in order to avoid the defense of license, it was JVC's obligation, given the industry-wide licensing under the DVD and Blu-ray standard pool, to show that end-users were engaging in direct infringement by using unlicensed discs. JVC had "cited no 'specific allegations and evidence' of unlicensed discs." JVC argued that summary judgment was premature and that additional discovery should have been allowed for JVC "collect specific information regarding customers that are using Nero software with unlicensed optical disks." But the Federal Circuit said that a party requesting additional discovery when faced with summary judgment must show that "the facts sought exist." Since JVC failed to do that, summary judgment against it was proper.

=== Exhaustion ===
The Federal Circuit then turned to the district court's holding of patent exhaustion, based on the Supreme Court's decision in Quanta Computer, Inc. v. LG Electronics, Inc. The district court had reasoned that, as JVC had argued, the intended use of DVD and Blu-ray optical discs is to "play, copy, and record data in conformance with the DVD and Blu-ray standards specifications." The district court concluded that since the optical discs comply with the standards, and their use complies with the standards to compliance with which JVC alleges its patents are essential, the patents are exhausted. The district court pointed out that, as in Quanta, no reasonable use for the licensed discs has been suggested other than practicing the patents. There is no alternative use for them. All JVC can argue is that the discs sold to Nero's customers were perhaps unlicensed, and that the sale of any such unlicensed discs would not trigger exhaustion of the patents. The Federal Circuit commented:

The district court remarked that JVC provided no support for the existence of unlicensed manufacturers of unlicensed standards-compliant discs, and correctly rejected JVC's argument that it did not bear the burden of coming forward with such evidence.

In this connection, the district court had said: "Obviously, the Court cannot merely infer that these parties in fact manufactured optical discs, that these optical discs infringe the Patents, that these optical discs are manufactured, imported, or sold in the U.S., and that these optical discs are then used in the U.S. with Nero software, without any showing that these facts exist."

The Federal Circuit then stated that the record did not establish that the discs on which exhaustion was based were licensed by JVC, and "[o]n the sketchy record, contradictory arguments, and undeveloped facts before us, we decline to expand the theory of patent exhaustion to reach this case." Therefore, the court affirmed the summary judgment on the ground that the direct infringement predicate for indirect infringement was not shown and it vacated the ruling as to exhaustion. The district court's judgment in Nero's favor against JVC was affirmed.

== Commentary ==
Dennis Crouch opined in his blog that perhaps the non-ruling as to exhaustion could be explained on two grounds: "It appears to me that the court did not want to further confuse the exhaustion doctrine with this case and perhaps Judges Newman, Dyk, and Reyna could not agree on the correct formulation."

The Law360 blog characterized JVC's argument to the district court at the April 2013 hearing on the summary judgment motion in these terms:

JVC argued at a hearing in April that its manufacturing licenses only allow a licensee to "make and sell the little disc that gets sold" and Nero should be required to "get a license for software instead of piggybacking on someone else who has a disc [manufacturing] license."

The Patent Docs blog said that the decision:

involves nuanced details of standard-essential patents, but arrived at a common sense result: either the patents at issue are standard-essential and thus licensed by defendant, or plaintiff cannot solely rely on the licensed technology standards to show infringement.

== See also ==
- DVD+RW
