= List of United States Supreme Court cases, volume 76 =

Supreme Court of the United States
- Interactive map of Supreme Court of the United States
- 38°53′26″N 77°00′16″W
- Established: March 4, 1789; 236 years ago
- Location: Washington, D.C.
- Coordinates: 38°53′26″N 77°00′16″W
- Composition method: Presidential nomination with Senate confirmation
- Authorised by: Constitution of the United States, Art. III, § 1
- Judge term length: life tenure, subject to impeachment and removal
- Number of positions: 9 (by statute)
- Website: supremecourt.gov

This is a list of cases reported in volume 76 (9 Wall.) of United States Reports, decided by the Supreme Court of the United States in 1870.

== Nominative reports ==
In 1874, the U.S. government created the United States Reports, and retroactively numbered older privately published case reports as part of the new series. As a result, cases appearing in volumes 1–90 of U.S. Reports have dual citation forms; one for the volume number of U.S. Reports, and one for the volume number of the reports named for the relevant reporter of decisions (these are called "nominative reports").

=== John William Wallace ===
Starting with the 66th volume of U.S. Reports, the Reporter of Decisions of the Supreme Court of the United States was John William Wallace. Wallace was Reporter of Decisions from 1863 to 1874, covering volumes 68 through 90 of United States Reports which correspond to volumes 1 through 23 of his Wallace's Reports. As such, the dual form of citation to, for example, Michigan Bank v. Eldred is 76 U.S. (9 Wall.) 544 (1870).

Wallace's Reports were the final nominative reports for the US Supreme Court; starting with volume 91, cases were identified simply as "(volume #) U.S. (page #) (year)".

== Justices of the Supreme Court at the time of 76 U.S. (9 Wall.) ==
The Supreme Court is established by Article III, Section 1 of the Constitution of the United States, which says: "The judicial Power of the United States, shall be vested in one supreme Court . . .". The size of the Court is not specified; the Constitution leaves it to Congress to set the number of justices. Under the Judiciary Act of 1789 Congress originally fixed the number of justices at six (one chief justice and five associate justices). Since 1789 Congress has varied the size of the Court from six to seven, nine, ten, and back to nine justices (always including one chief justice).

To prevent President Andrew Johnson from appointing any justices, a hostile Congress passed the Judicial Circuits Act of 1866, eliminating three of the 10 seats from the Supreme Court as they became vacant, and so potentially reducing the size of the court to seven justices. The vacancy caused by the death of Justice John Catron in 1865 had not been filled, so after Justice James Moore Wayne died in July 1867 there were eight justices left on the court at the start of the term when the cases in 76 U.S. (9 Wall.) were decided; however Justice Robert Cooper Grier resigned at the end of January 1870, temporarily reducing the Court to seven justices. Newly confirmed justices William Strong and Joseph P. Bradley joined the Court in March 1870, in the final weeks of the session. This brought the Court back to nine justices, the number set by the Judiciary Act of 1869.

=== Fluctuations in Supreme Court membership, 1864-1870 ===
Justice	Departure from the Court	Arrival on the Court	Number of active justices after his arrival or departure
Chase	-	15 December 1864	10 (the then-current statutory number)
Catron	30 May 1865	-	9 (one less than the then-current statutory number of 10)
Wayne	5 July 1867	-	8 (one more than the then-current statutory number of 7)
Grier	31 January 1870	-	7 (two less than the then-current statutory number of 9)
Strong	-	14 March 1870	8 (one less than the then-current statutory number of 9)
Bradley	-	23 March 1870	9 (the then-current statutory number)

=== Justices during at least part of the Court session reported in 76 U.S. (9 Wall.) ===
Portrait	Justice	Office	Home State	Succeeded	Date confirmed by the Senate (Vote)	Tenure on Supreme Court
	Salmon P. Chase	Chief Justice	Ohio	Roger B. Taney	December 6, 1864 (Acclamation)	December 15, 1864 – May 7, 1873 (Died)
	Samuel Nelson	Associate Justice	New York	Smith Thompson	February 14, 1845 (Acclamation)	February 27, 1845 – November 28, 1872 (Retired)
	Robert Cooper Grier	Associate Justice	Pennsylvania	Henry Baldwin	August 4, 1846 (Acclamation)	August 10, 1846 – January 31, 1870 (Retired)
	Nathan Clifford	Associate Justice	Maine	Benjamin Robbins Curtis	January 12, 1858 (26–23)	January 21, 1858 – July 25, 1881 (Died)
	Noah Haynes Swayne	Associate Justice	Ohio	John McLean	January 24, 1862 (38–1)	January 27, 1862 – January 24, 1881 (Retired)
	Samuel Freeman Miller	Associate Justice	Iowa	Peter Vivian Daniel	July 16, 1862 (Acclamation)	July 21, 1862 – October 13, 1890 (Died)
	David Davis	Associate Justice	Illinois	John Archibald Campbell	December 8, 1862 (Acclamation)	December 10, 1862 – March 4, 1877 (Resigned)
	Stephen Johnson Field	Associate Justice	California	newly created seat	March 10, 1863 (Acclamation)	May 10, 1863 – December 1, 1897 (Retired)
	William Strong	Associate Justice	Pennsylvania	Robert Cooper Grier	February 18, 1870 (No vote recorded)	March 14, 1870 – December 14, 1880 (Retired)
	Joseph P. Bradley	Associate Justice	New Jersey	newly created seat	March 21, 1870 (46–9)	March 23, 1870 – January 22, 1892 (Died)

== Citation style ==
Under the Judiciary Act of 1789 the federal court structure at the time comprised District Courts, which had general trial jurisdiction; Circuit Courts, which had mixed trial and appellate (from the US District Courts) jurisdiction; and the United States Supreme Court, which had appellate jurisdiction over the federal District and Circuit courts—and for certain issues over state courts. The Supreme Court also had limited original jurisdiction (i.e., in which cases could be filed directly with the Supreme Court without first having been heard by a lower federal or state court). There were one or more federal District Courts and/or Circuit Courts in each state, territory, or other geographical region.

Bluebook citation style is used for case names, citations, and jurisdictions.

- "C.C.D." = United States Circuit Court for the District of . . .
  - e.g.,"C.C.D.N.J." = United States Circuit Court for the District of New Jersey
- "D." = United States District Court for the District of . . .
  - e.g.,"D. Mass." = United States District Court for the District of Massachusetts
- "E." = Eastern; "M." = Middle; "N." = Northern; "S." = Southern; "W." = Western
  - e.g.,"C.C.S.D.N.Y." = United States Circuit Court for the Southern District of New York
  - e.g.,"M.D. Ala." = United States District Court for the Middle District of Alabama
- "Ct. Cl." = United States Court of Claims
- The abbreviation of a state's name alone indicates the highest appellate court in that state's judiciary at the time.
  - e.g.,"Pa." = Supreme Court of Pennsylvania
  - e.g.,"Me." = Supreme Judicial Court of Maine

== List of cases in 76 U.S. (9 Wall.) ==
Case Name	Page and year	Opinion of the Court	Concurring opinion(s)	Dissenting opinion(s)	Lower Court	Disposition
Neale v. Neale	1 (1870)	Davis	none	none	Sup. Ct. D.C.	affirmed
Reese v. United States	13 (1870)	Field	none	none	C.C.D. Cal.	reversed
McGoon v. Scales	23 (1870)	Miller	none	none	C.C.D. Wis.	affirmed
Haver v. Yaker	32 (1870)	Davis	none	none	Ky.	affirmed
Gut v. Minnesota	35 (1870)	Field	none	none	Minn.	affirmed
Basset v. United States	38 (1870)	Miller	none	none	C.C.N.D. Ohio	affirmed
United States v. Dewitt	41 (1870)	Chase	none	none	C.C.E.D. Mich.	certification
Filor v. United States	45 (1870)	Field	none	none	Ct. Cl.	affirmed
City of Chicago v. Sheldon	50 (1870)	Nelson	none	none	C.C.N.D. Ill.	affirmed
United States v. Anderson	56 (1870)	Davis	none	none	Ct. Cl.	affirmed
United States v. Grossmayer	72 (1870)	Davis	none	none	Ct. Cl.	reversed
Smith v. Morse	76 (1870)	Field	none	none	C.C.S.D.N.Y.	affirmed
United States v. Keehler	83 (1870)	Miller	none	none	C.C.D.N.C.	certification
Burlington and Missouri River Railroad Company v. Fremont County	89 (1870)	Nelson	none	none	Iowa	affirmed
Hannibal and St. Joseph Railroad Company v. Smith	95 (1870)	Miller	none	Clifford	Mo.	affirmed
Pelham v. Rose	103 (1870)	Field	none	none	C.C.D. Ind.	certification
Cheever v. Wilson	108 (1870)	Swayne	none	none	Sup. Ct. D.C.	reversed
Norris v. Jackson	125 (1870)	Miller	none	none	C.C.N.D. Ill.	affirmed
The Grapeshot	129 (1870)	Chase	none	none	C.C.D. La.	reversed
Latham's Appeal	145 (1870)	Chase	none	none	Ct. Cl.	dismissed
The Johnson	146 (1870)	Clifford	none	none	C.C.S.D.N.Y.	affirmed
Bonner v. United States	156 (1870)	Davis	none	none	Ct. Cl.	reversed
The Harriman	161 (1870)	Swayne	none	none	C.C.D. Cal.	affirmed
In re Howard	175 (1870)	Field	none	none	C.C.D. Iowa	mandamus denied
Frisbie v. Whitney	187 (1870)	Miller	none	none	Sup. Ct. D.C.	reversed
Hickman v. Jones	197 (1870)	Swayne	none	none	N.D. Ala.	reversed
The Star of Hope	203 (1870)	Clifford	none	none	C.C.D. Cal.	reversed
The Steamboat Burns	237 (1870)	Miller	none	none	Mo.	dismissed
Linthicum v. Ray	241 (1870)	Field	none	none	Sup. Ct. D.C.	affirmed
Ex parte Zellner	244 (1870)	Nelson	none	none	original	mandamus denied
Barney v. Schmeider	248 (1870)	Miller	none	none	C.C.S.D.N.Y.	reversed
Swain v. Seamens	254 (1870)	Clifford	none	none	C.C.D. Wis.	affirmed
Justices v. Murray	274 (1870)	Nelson	none	none	C.C.S.D.N.Y.	reversed
St. Louis Public Schools v. Walker	282 (1870)	Miller	none	none	Mo.	affirmed
Burnett v. Caldwell	290 (1870)	Swayne	none	none	N.D. Ga.	affirmed
Lobrano v. Nelligan	295 (1870)	Davis	none	none	La.	affirmed
Secretary of the Interior v. McGarrahan	298 (1870)	Clifford	Miller	none	Sup. Ct. D.C.	reversed
Lynch v. Bernal	315 (1870)	Field	none	none	Cal.	affirmed
Bennett v. Hunter	326 (1870)	Chase	none	none	Va.	affirmed
Bigelow v. Forrest	339 (1870)	Strong	none	none	Va.	affirmed
First National Bank v. Kentucky	353 (1870)	Miller	none	none	Ky.	affirmed
Jones v. Bolles	364 (1870)	Bradley	none	none	C.C.D. Wis.	affirmed
Mephams v. Biessel	370 (1870)	Swayne	none	none	C.C.D. Mo.	affirmed
Bank of Washington v. Nock	373 (1870)	Clifford	none	none	Sup. Ct. D.C.	affirmed
Bushnell v. Kennedy	387 (1870)	Chase	none	none	C.C.D. La.	reversed
Noonan v. Bradley	394 (1870)	Field	none	Clifford	C.C.D. Wis.	reversed
City of Davenport v. Lord	409 (1870)	Swayne	none	none	C.C.D. Iowa	affirmed
Washington County v. Durant	415 (1870)	Strong	none	none	C.C.D. Iowa	affirmed
The Fairbanks	420 (1870)	Clifford	none	none	C.C.S.D.N.Y.	reversed
Flanders v. Tweed	425 (1870)	Nelson	none	none	C.C.D. La.	reversed
United States v. Hosmer	432 (1870)	Swayne	none	none	Ct. Cl.	affirmed
The Maggie Hammond	435 (1870)	Clifford	none	none	C.C.D. Md.	affirmed
Copelin v. Phoenix Insurance Company	461 (1870)	Strong	none	none	C.C.D. Mo.	affirmed
Lionberger v. Rouse	468 (1870)	Davis	none	none	Mo.	affirmed
City of Kenosha v. Lamson	477 (1870)	Nelson	none	none	C.C.D. Wis.	affirmed
Ingle v. Jones	486 (1870)	Swayne	none	none	Sup. Ct. D.C.	affirmed
Hoe v. Wilson	501(1870)	Swayne	none	none	Sup. Ct. D.C.	reversed
The Nonesuch	504 (1870)	Chase	none	none	N.D. Fla.	dismissed
The Gray Eagle	505 (1870)	Bradley	none	none	C.C.D. Wis.	affirmed
The Gregory	513 (1870)	Field	none	none	C.C.S.D.N.Y.	affirmed
The Keokuk	517 (1870)	Davis	none	none	C.C.D. Wis.	reversed
The Alleghany	522 (1870)	Strong	none	none	C.C.D. Wis.	affirmed
The Northern Belle	526 (1870)	Miller	none	none	C.C.D. Wis.	affirmed
United States v. Padelford	531 (1870)	Chase	none	none	Ct. Cl.	affirmed
Michigan Insurance Bank v. Eldred	544 (1870)	Clifford	none	none	C.C.D. Wis.	reversed
United States v. Adams I	554 (1870)	Nelson	none	none	Ct. Cl.	reformation denied
Hornthall v. Keary	560 (1870)	Clifford	none	none	C.C.S.D. Miss.	reversed
Gates v. Osbornes	567 (1870)	Clifford	none	none	C.C.N.D.N.Y.	reversed
Litchfield v. Richards	575 (1870)	Miller	none	none	C.C.D. Iowa	affirmed
Thomson v. Union Pacific Railroad	579 (1870)	Chase	none	none	C.C.D. Kan.	certification
Merryman v. Bourne	592 (1870)	Swayne	none	none	C.C.D. Cal.	affirmed
Public Schools v. Walker	603 (1870)	Chase	none	none	N.D. Ga.	reargument denied
Ex parte Morris	605 (1870)	Swayne	none	none	M.D. Ala.	mandamus granted
United States v. Ayres	608 (1870)	Nelson	none	none	Ct. Cl.	dismissed
Worthy v. Moore County	611 (1870)	Chase	none	none	N.C.	dismissed
United States v. Merrill	614 (1870)	Clifford	none	none	Ct. Cl.	reversed
Irvine v. Irvine	617 (1870)	Strong	none	none	C.C.D. Minn.	affirmed
The Corsica	630 (1870)	Bradley	none	none	C.C.S.D.N.Y.	affirmed
The City of Paris	634 (1870)	Swayne	none	none	C.C.S.D.N.Y.	affirmed
United States v. Rocha	639 (1870)	Nelson	none	Clifford	S.D. Cal.	affirmed
The Suffolk County	651 (1870)	Miller	none	none	C.C.S.D.N.Y.	affirmed
Green v. United States	655 (1870)	Bradley	none	none	C.C.S.D. Ohio	reversed
Downham v. City of Alexandria	659 (1870)	Chase	none	none	Va. County Ct.	dismissal denied
United States v. Adams II	661 (1870)	Bradley	none	none	Ct. Cl.	remanded
Herndon v. Howard	664 (1870)	Chase	none	none	C.C.W.D. Tex.	procedural ruling
The Quickstep	665 (1870)	Davis	none	none	C.C.S.D.N.Y.	affirmed
The Syracuse	672 (1870)	Swayne	none	none	C.C.S.D.N.Y.	affirmed
Aetna Insurance Company v. Weide	677 (1870)	Nelson	none	none	C.C.D. Minn.	affirmed
The Portsmouth	682 (1870)	Strong	none	none	C.C.N.D. Ill.	affirmed
The Protector	687 (1870)	Bradley	none	none	C.C.S.D. Ala.	dismissal denied
Meade v. United States	691 (1870)	Clifford	none	none	Ct. Cl.	affirmed
City of Chicago v. Greer	726 (1870)	Strong	none	none	C.C.N.D. Ill.	affirmed
Poweshiek County v. Durant	736 (1870)	Nelson	none	none	C.C.D. Iowa	affirmed
Wise v. Allis	737 (1870)	Miller	none	none	C.C.D. Wis.	certification
Wilkins v. Ellett's Administrator	740 (1870)	Nelson	none	none	C.C.W.D. Tenn.	reversed
Walker v. Walker's Executor	743 (1870)	Davis	none	none	C.C.D. Mass.	various orders
The Guy	758 (1870)	Chase	none	none	C.C.E.D.N.Y.	affirmed
Watkins v. United States	759 (1870)	Clifford	none	none	C.C.D. Md.	affirmed
Butler v. Maples	766 (1870)	Strong	none	none	C.C.W.D. Tenn.	affirmed
Gleason v. Florida	779 (1870)	Chase	none	none	Fla.	dismissed
Carpenter v. Williams	785 (1870)	Miller	none	none	Mo.	dismissed
Pierce v. Cox	786 (1870)	Chase	none	none	Sup. Ct. D.C.	dismissed
Rubber Company v. Goodyear I	788 (1870)	Swayne	none	none	C.C.D.R.I.	affirmed
Rubber Company v. Goodyear II	805 (1870)	Swayne	none	none	C.C.D.R.I.	filing denied
Rubber Company v. Goodyear III	807 (1870)	per curiam	none	none	C.C.D.R.I.	affirmed
Bourne v. Goodyear	811 (1870)	Chase	none	none	C.C.S.D.N.Y.	affirmed
Bischoff v. Wethered	812 (1870)	Bradley	none	none	C.C.D. Md.	affirmed

== See also ==
certificate of division
