= United States v. Univis Lens Co. =

- Supreme Court of the United States

Argued April 9–10, 1942 Decided May 11, 1942
- Full case name: United States v. Univis Lens Co., Inc., et al.
- Citations: 316 U.S. 241 (more) 62 S. Ct. 1088; 86 L. Ed. 1408; 1942 U.S. LEXIS 1241; 53 U.S.P.Q. (BNA) 404

Court membership
- Chief Justice Harlan F. Stone Associate Justices Owen Roberts · Hugo Black; Stanley F. Reed · Felix Frankfurter; William O. Douglas · Frank Murphy; James F. Byrnes · Robert H. Jackson

Case opinion
- Majority: Stone, joined by Roberts, Black, Reed, Frankfurter, Douglas, Murphy, Byrnes
- Jackson took no part in the consideration or decision of the case.

United States v. Univis Lens Co., 316 U.S. 241 (1942), is a decision of the United States Supreme Court explaining the exhaustion doctrine and applying it to find an antitrust violation because Univis's ownership of patents did not exclude its restrictive practices from the antitrust laws. The Univis case stands for the proposition that when an article sold by a patent holder or one whom it has authorized to sell it embodies the essential features of a patented invention, the effect of the sale is to terminate any right of the patent holder under patent law to control the purchaser's further disposition or use of the article itself and of articles into which it is incorporated as a component or precursor.

== Background ==
Univis, the owner of various method and product patents on optical lenses, manufactured lens blanks and sold them to licensees. When the unpatented blanks were ground and polished they became patented lenses. The licenses required the licensees to sell the lenses at prices that Univis fixed.

Cross–sections of lenses according to Univis's U.S. Patent No. 1,845,940

The lens blanks were specially adapted for making the patented lenses, and consequently the only use to which the blanks would be put and the only object of their sale was to enable the manufacture of the patented lenses. Thus, the Court was led to assume that sale of the blanks by an unlicensed manufacturer to an unlicensed finisher, who created the patented lenses by grounding and polishing the lenses, would be a contributory infringer.

== Supreme Court decision ==
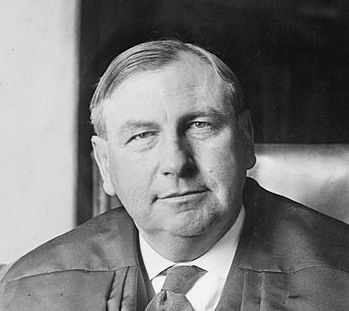
Chief Justice Stone delivered the opinion of the Court

Because the sale of the blanks would be contributory infringement, the Court ruled, the sale of the blanks exhausted the patent. Therefore, the case was governed by the exhaustion doctrine, which holds that—

An incident to the purchase of any article, whether patented or unpatented, is the right to use and sell it, and upon familiar principles the authorized sale of an article which is capable of use only in practicing the patent is a relinquishment of the patent monopoly with respect to the article sold.

The sale exhausts the patent monopoly "and the patentee may not thereafter, by virtue of his patent, control the use or disposition of the article," such as by fixing the resale price of the sold article. That the sold article was the unfinished lens blank, not the patented finished lens, did not alter the case:

[W]here one has sold an uncompleted article which, because it embodies essential features of his patented invention, is within the protection of his patent, and has destined the article to be finished by the purchaser in conformity to the patent, he has sold his invention so far as it is or may be embodied in that particular article. The reward he demanded and received is for the article and the invention which it embodies and which his vendee is to practice upon it. He has thus parted with his right to assert the patent monopoly with respect to it and is no longer free to control the price at which it may be sold either in its unfinished or finished form.

This principle applied equally '[w]hether the licensee sells the patented article in its completed form or sells it before completion for the purpose of enabling the buyer to finish and sell it." Since Univis's ownership of the patents did not shield its restrictions over post-sale conduct, the ordinary rules of law applied, under which price fixing is illegal.

Finally, the Court declined to try to separate (and preserve) the beneficial or pro-competitive features of the licensing system from the illegal ones. Any valid "features are so interwoven with and identified with the price restrictions which are the core of the licensing system that the case is an appropriate one for the suppression of the entire licensing scheme although some of its features, independently established, might have been used for lawful purposes."

== Subsequent developments ==
The exhaustion doctrine as restated in the Univis decision has remained a governing principle of United States patent and antitrust law. The Supreme Court relied on Univis in its 2008 decision in Quanta Computer, Inc. v. LG Electronics, Inc. to hold that the sale of patented microprocessors exhausted the patent monopoly including patents covering the combination of the patented microprocessors with other components, where (as in Univis) the essential features of the invention were all contained in the microprocessors, i.e., the sold article embodies the essential features of the patented invention. (Quanta's primary patents were on microprocessors, but it also had patents on products combining the patented microprocessors and other apparently conventional devices, such as PCs. See exhausted combination doctrine for an explanation of such patents.)

== See also ==
- List of United States Supreme Court cases, volume 316
