= Quanta Computer, Inc. v. LG Electronics, Inc. =

- Supreme Court of the United States

Argued January 16, 2008 Decided June 9, 2008
- Full case name: Quanta Computer, Inc., et al., Petitioners, v. LG Electronics, Inc.
- Docket no.: 06-937
- Citations: 553 U.S. 617 (more) 128 S. Ct. 2109; 170 L. Ed. 2d 996; 2008 U.S. LEXIS 4702; 76 USLW 4375; 86 U.S.P.Q.2d 1673

Case history
- Prior: Summary judgment denied, finding of non-infringement, LG Elecs., Inc. v. Asustek Computer, Inc., 248 F. Supp. 2d 912 (N.D. Cal. 2003); reversed in part and remanded, LG Elecs., Inc. v. Bizcom Elecs., Inc., 453 F.3d 1364 (Fed. Cir. 2006) (finding that license language sufficient to create limited license and exhaustion doctrine does not apply to method claims); cert. granted, 551 U.S. 1187 (2007).

Holding
- Patent license language insufficient to create limited license and avoid effect of exhaustion doctrine; exhaustion doctrine applies to method claims and to authorized sale of article that substantially embodies claimed invention.

Court membership
- Chief Justice John Roberts Associate Justices John P. Stevens · Antonin Scalia; Anthony Kennedy · David Souter; Clarence Thomas · Ruth Bader Ginsburg; Stephen Breyer · Samuel Alito

Case opinion
- Majority: Thomas, joined by unanimous

Quanta Computer, Inc. v. LG Electronics, Inc., 553 U.S. 617 (2008), is a case decided by the United States Supreme Court in which the Court reaffirmed the validity of the patent exhaustion doctrine. The decision made uncertain the continuing precedential value of a line of decisions in the Federal Circuit that had sought to limit Supreme Court exhaustion doctrine decisions to their facts and to require a so-called "rule of reason" analysis of all post-sale restrictions other than tie-ins and price fixes. In the course of restating the patent exhaustion doctrine, the Court held that it is triggered by, among other things, an authorized sale of a component when the only reasonable and intended use of the component is to engage the patent and the component substantially embodies the patented invention by embodying its essential features. The Court also overturned, in passing, that the exhaustion doctrine was limited to product claims and did not apply to method claims.

== Factual background ==
LG Electronics (LGE) owned several patents on methods and systems for processing information. It entered into two contracts with Intel. In the License Agreement, LGE authorized Intel to make and sell microprocessor products using the patented inventions. Moreover, the License Agreement expressly stated that no license was granted to any third party for combining licensed products with other products (for example, for combining Intel microprocessor products with other parts of a computer). The License Agreement also provided, however, "Notwithstanding anything to the contrary contained in this Agreement, the parties agree that nothing herein shall in any way limit or alter the effect of patent exhaustion that would otherwise apply when a party hereto sells any of its Licensed Products."

In the Master Agreement, LGE required Intel to give its customers notice that the patent license does not extend to any product made by combining a licensed Intel microprocessor product with any other product (for example, a computer). The Master Agreement also provided that its breach would have no effect on the License Agreement and would not be grounds for its termination. Apparently, LGE was willing to allow Intel's customers to combine the microprocessor products with products not licensed by LGE, but only upon payment of a further royalty to LGE for the right to do so. This point is not discussed in the Court's opinion, which recites the facts only in very limited terms because the record was under seal to protect trade secrets.

Quanta Computer purchased licensed Intel microprocessor products and proceeded to manufacture computers containing them. In doing so, Quanta followed Intel's specifications, which in turn led to practice of the patented methods and making the patented systems that LGE licensed to Intel––since that was the way Intel had designed its microprocessor products. (The trial court found that the Intel microprocessor products were without any reasonable noninfringing use.) LGE then sued Quanta for patent infringement.

Quanta prevailed in the district court under the exhaustion doctrine, but on appeal the Federal Circuit held that the exhaustion doctrine did not apply because of the statement in the Master Agreement that combination products were not licensed, given the Federal Circuit's 1992 ruling in Mallinckrodt, Inc. v. Medipart, Inc. that a seller of patented goods could by notice impose a post-sale restraint on its customer's use of the goods. Additionally, the Federal Circuit held that the exhaustion doctrine did not apply, in any event, to method patents.

== Mallinckrodt background ==
In Mallinckrodt, Inc. v. Medipart, Inc., the Federal Circuit had held that patent owners could condition the sale of patented goods with a restrictive notice and thereby restrict the disposition of the goods by the purchasers, with the exception of antitrust law violations, such as price-fixing and tie-in restrictions, or violations of "some other law or policy." More specifically, the Mallinckrodt court had said, "Unless the condition violates some other law or policy (in the patent field, notably the misuse of antitrust law)," patent owners, licensees and downstream purchasers "retain the freedom to contract concerning conditions of sale".

The Federal Circuit went on to say that "[t]he appropriate criterion" in determining whether "a restriction or condition . . . placed upon the sale of a patented article" is valid "is whether [the patentee's or licensor's] restriction is reasonably within the patent grant, or whether the patentee has ventured beyond the patent grant and into behavior having an anticompetitive effect not justifiable under the rule of reason." According to the court, the tests for restrictions and misuse were alike, outside the tie-in and price fixing area: "To sustain a misuse defense involving a licensing arrangement not held to have been per se anticompetitive by the Supreme Court, a factual determination must reveal that the overall effect of the license tends to restrain competition unlawfully in an appropriately defined relevant market."

This Federal Circuit test is contrary to many decisions of both the Supreme Court and other courts of appeals. For example, in Zenith Radio Corp. v. Hazeltine Research, Inc., the Supreme Court addressed the legality of licenses under which royalties were paid on total sales of all products, irrespective of whether the licensor's patents covered all products. The Court held that such licensing was permissible when the licensor and licensee adopted it for mutual convenience to simplify administration of the license, but it was impermissible for the licensor to insist upon it over the licensee's opposition. Such conduct was misuse, the Court held, but not an antitrust violation unless the other elements of an antitrust violation were also shown, such as market power.

Earlier, in Brulotte v. Thys Co., the Supreme Court held that it was patent misuse if, without more, a patentee charged royalties that extended beyond the statutory term of the patent. In National Lockwasher Co. v. George K. Garrett Co., the United States Court of Appeals for the Third Circuit held that a patentee misused its patent by requiring licensees to agree not to deal in the technology of the patentee's competitors. Thus, in these cases, among many others, the Supreme Court and other federal courts had found misuse in cases not involving price fixing or tie-ins, and had not required any rule-of-reason or relevant-market analysis.

Other Federal Circuit decisions followed the Mallinckrodt approach, which at the very least diverged from Supreme Court decisions. Accordingly, when certiorari was granted in Quanta, it was widely surmised that the Supreme Court would overturn Mallinckrodt, which many (including the United States Solicitor General Jeffrey Wall, viewed as inconsistent with Supreme Court precedent.

== Supreme Court opinion ==
The Supreme Court unanimously reversed, in an opinion by Justice Clarence Thomas.

=== Method claims ===
First, the Court said, the distinction between method and product claims is insupportable. In United States v. Univis Lens Co., the most recent decision of the Court on exhaustion, some of the patents held exhausted were method patents. Earlier, in Ethyl Gasoline Corp. v. United States, some patents covered a method of combusting gasoline in an automobile engine––and the exhaustion doctrine was held applicable. Furthermore, because it is easy to write patent claims for the same invention either in method format or apparatus format, the exhaustion doctrine could easily be evaded if reliance on method claims was sufficient to avoid exhaustion: By "including a method claim for the machine's patented method of performing its task, a patent drafter could shield practically any patented item from exhaustion."

=== Exhaustion and related patents ===
The Court then turned to the extent, if any, to which exhaustion of the patent rights on the microprocessor products exhausted patent rights relating to the combination products on which LGE had patents. In the Univis case the sale that exhausted patent rights was a sale of an unpatented semifinished lens blank, which subsequent processing turned into a patented finished lens. The Intel microprocessor products were finished commercial articles of commerce, but in this case the trial court had found as a fact that the microprocessor products had no noninfringing use, just as in the Univis case the semifinished lens blanks had no use but to be finished into the patented finished lens blanks. Therefore, the Court found Univis dispositive. In the Quanta Court's language, in Univis "exhaustion was triggered by the sale of the lens blanks because their only reasonable and intended use was to practice the patent and because they 'embodie[d] essential features of [the] patented invention.'"

LGE did not challenge the claim that the intended and reasonable use of the microprocessor products was to incorporate them into computers, but it claimed that some noninfringing uses existed: they could be sold overseas, as repair parts, or by disabling the features that made them patented. The Court dismissed these arguments. As for disablement, the Court asserted that the disabled device aspects ("features") rather than the device that remained must have a noninfringing use, so that disabling them would cause them to have "no real use." As for foreign or replacement use, the legal test to be looked to was whether the product would perform the patented method or embody the patented product, not whether the use gave rise to infringement liability.

A further reason why sales of the microprocessor products exhausted LGE's patent rights was that "everything inventive about each patent is embodied in" the licensed Intel products, which "embody the essential features of the [licensed] patents because they carry out all the inventive processes when combined, according to their design, with standard components." Any point of novelty—that is, respect in which the claimed invention departs from the prior art—is found in the licensed microprocessor products rather than in the combination product of which they are components.

This last aspect of the Quanta opinion is similar to the doctrine of the Lincoln Engineering case, a doctrine that the Federal Circuit had previously held to be no longer authoritative. Under the Supreme Court's Lincoln Engineering doctrine, the combination of a newly invented device with a known, conventional device with which the new device cooperates in the conventional and predictable way in which devices of those types have previously cooperated is unpatentable as an "exhausted combination" or "old combination." Thus, when the Quanta Court said that "everything inventive about each patent is embodied in" the licensed Intel products, which "embody the essential features of the [licensed] patents", the Court was in effect saying that the combination of a novel Intel microprocessor in a conventional manner with an old personal computer is an exhausted combination. Accordingly, no weight would be put on the fact that separate patents had issued to LGE on the inventive device and on the old combination that included it.

=== Licensing a limited field ===
LGE's argument for non-exhaustion sought to invoke the doctrine of General Talking Pictures Corp. v. Western Electric Co. In that case, the patentee had granted no license for "commercial" amplifiers. Therefore, when a manufacturer licensed only in the "non-commercial" field of use sold an amplifier to an accused infringer, who knowingly resold it in the commercial market, the manufacturer "could not convey to [the accused infringer] what both knew it was not authorized to sell." By parity of reasoning, LGE said, it had licensed Intel only in the field of manufacturing microprocessor products for combination with specified products and not with other products. But the Court said that was not how LGE had drafted its license to Intel:

LGE overlooks important aspects of the structure of the ... transaction. Nothing in the License Agreement restricts Intel's right to sell its microprocessors ... to purchasers who intend to combine them with non-Intel parts. It broadly permits Intel to make, use, or sell products free of the patent claims. To be sure, LGE did require Intel to give notice to its customers, including Quanta, that LGE had not licensed those customers to practice its patents. But neither party contends that Intel breached the agreement in that respect. LGE points out that the License Agreement specifically disclaimed any license to third parties to practice the patents by combining licensed products with other components. But the question whether third parties received implied licenses is irrelevant because Quanta asserts its right to practice the patents based not on implied license but on exhaustion. And exhaustion turns only on Intel's own license to sell products practicing the ... patents.

The Court appears to be saying that LGE simply licensed Intel to make, use, and sell microprocessor products. LGE expressly stated that no license was granted to any third party for combining licensed products with other products; and LGE made Intel tell its customers about the absence of a license. But LGE did not say to Intel that LGE licensed Intel to make, use, and sell microprocessor products only in the field of microprocessor products combined with other LGE-licensed products (so-called Intel products). There was no explicit field-of-use limitation on Intel's manufacturing, using, and selling rights––no "magic words." LGE came close––it said it was not licensing third parties to combine licensed product with other products, and it required Intel to notify customers of that––but LGE failed to go right to the point and expressly deny Intel any license to make microprocessor products that would be combined with other products. Furthermore, for some inexplicable reason the parties, with fatal effect, red-flagged the fact that there still was an exhaustion doctrine: "Notwithstanding anything to the contrary contained in this Agreement, the parties agree that nothing herein shall in any way limit or alter the effect of patent exhaustion that would otherwise apply when a party hereto sells any of its Licensed Products."

That this was a critical error (for LGE) is confirmed by the Court's final statements in its opinion:

The License Agreement authorized Intel to sell products that practiced the patents. No conditions limited Intel's authority to sell products substantially embodying the patents. ... Intel's authorized sale to Quanta thus took its products outside the scope of the patent monopoly, and as a result, LGE can no longer assert its patent rights against Quanta.

Thus, the exhaustion doctrine governed what Quanta could lawfully do with what it bought from Intel. The failure to give third parties a license to combine Intel microprocessor product with other products had no legal significance, because the exhaustion doctrine obviated any need for such a license. Having bought the products from an authorized seller, Quanta didn't need any license.

=== No contract issue ===
The Court added a final note pointing out that the case did not raise, and the Court did not rule on, whether LGE could have enforced a contractual restriction. In footnote 7, the Court commented:

We note that the authorized nature of the sale to Quanta does not necessarily limit LGE's other contract rights. LGE's complaint does not include a breach-of-contract claim, and we express no opinion on whether contract damages might be available even though exhaustion operates to eliminate patent damages.

By the same token, the Court said nothing as to specific performance or whether contract rights, if any, could be enforced against Quanta.

== Impact and issues that the court did not consider ==
The impact of Quanta is problematic, largely because the decision avoided deciding many issues, presumably in the interest of maintaining consensus. (The decision was unanimous.) One academic commented:

It is a very disappointing decision from the Court. It decided so little, and it was such an important case. You are left reading tea leaves.

The Court's failure to approve or reject the precedent on which the Federal Circuit had relied in its decision in Quanta, Mallinckrodt, Inc. v. Medipart, Inc., which had limited the applicability of the exhaustion doctrine when a sale was made "conditional," further contributed to business uncertainty about permissible license restrictions. But, as one commentator observed:

The Supreme Court, in Quanta, was widely expected to rule on whether Mallinckrodt was good law. But the Court sidestepped the issue by narrowly interpreting the license agreement so that it was not a conditional license. ... Because the Supreme Court sidestepped the issue, it remains unclear to what extent a patentee can use a conditional license to impose restrictions on downstream purchasers.

The Court held that "[t]he longstanding doctrine of patent exhaustion provides that the initial authorized sale of a patented item terminates all patent rights to that item." But what constitutes "authorization"? The Court did not address the issue of "constructive" authorization—that is, authorization as a matter of law in certain circumstances, whether or not the patentee or licensor likes it or tries to avoid it. Accordingly, it is uncertain to what extent Quanta undoes Mallinckrodt. That seems to be the unstated message in Quanta, but the Federal Circuit may take an impenitent view, in defiance of the Solicitor General's views as amicus.

=== Other transactional forms ===
The Court left important issues addressed in Quanta. One issue is that the Court did not say anything about the other possible forms this transaction could have employed—such as a sale by a manufacturing licensee with a limitation on its grant, or (alternatively) a sale by the patentee or its licensee with explicit restrictions imposed on the buyer's freedom to dispose of the product. The Court did not explain whether or in what circumstances these other formats would be legally effective.

The first of these possible formats follows the pattern of the General Talking Pictures case. The second format follows the pattern of the Mallinckrodt case. Under the former, a patentee may limit the scope of a manufacturer-licensee's license to a defined field—such as microprocessors not incorporated into computers—and then the use of those micropressors as computer components is a patent infringement. This is the format that LGE thought it was using. Under the Mallinckrodt doctrine, sale of a patented product subject to a restriction—such as this microprocessor cannot be sold for use as a computer component—is a "conditional," rather than "unconditional," sale. If the condition is violated the conduct is patent infringement. The exhaustion doctrine does not apply under the rule stated in Mallinkrodt. However, as Quanta seemingly holds, when a restriction is not clearly and explicitly stated the exhaustion doctrine applies.

=== Resolving the "anomaly" ===
In a brief to the Supreme Court (at its request) when the petition for writ of certiorari was pending, the Solicitor General observed that a curious "anomaly" existed between the exhaustion doctrine and General Talking Pictures doctrine:

[T]here is a seeming anomaly in allowing a patentee to achieve indirectly –- through an enforceable condition on the licensee –– a limitation on use or resale that [because of the exhaustion doctrine] the patentee could not itself impose on a direct purchaser, [yet] the distinction is a necessary and explicable result of the Court's decision in General Talking Pictures.

For reasons that so far have not been explained in any publicly available document, the Government deleted this passage from its subsequent brief on the merits. As the Government brief suggested, on the one hand, the exhaustion doctrine prohibits post-sale restraints on a patentee's (or its licensee's) sale of goods, while on the other hand General Talking Pictures permits a patentee to place post-sale limitations on its manufacturing licensee's sale of goods if the license to manufacture uses the right, wording. Nothing in the Quanta opinion addresses this, much less attempts to resolve it or synthesize the competing doctrines.

=== Contract vs the exhaustion doctrine ===
The Court's note 7 expressly refrained from stating any of the following: whether contractual language could overcome, or prevent triggering, the exhaustion doctrine; if so, what language would accomplish that; and whether the context would be relevant.

To the extent that the exhaustion doctrine is grounded in considerations of public policy, and to the extent that the interests of the public and third parties (such as Quanta in the Quanta case) are to be considered as well as those of the contracting parties, the courts may be more likely to place limits on whether the parties can by contract make the doctrine inapplicable to the goods that are the subject of their contract. On the other hand, if the policy of the exhaustion doctrine is merely a rule to make sure that downstream purchasers get fair notice that their use of such goods will be restricted, courts may be more likely to uphold such restrictions unless they collide with other policies, such as those of competition or antitrust law.

The Court explicitly refused to consider this issue in Quanta. The Quanta court did make clear, however, that it recognized the fundamental difference in law between a sale of patented goods by a patentee and a patentee's license of another to manufacture the patented goods, which the Supreme Court had explained in United States v. General Electric Co. At the same time, the Court made it clear that LGE had failed to license Intel in language that complied with the General Talking Pictures doctrine, which could have changed the outcome.

The House of Lords considered whether contract could defeat the similar doctrine against derogation from title in British Leyland Motor Corp. v. Armstrong Patents Co. This is the doctrine that a seller may not successfully take actions, such as enforcing an intellectual property right, that decrease the value of what the seller has sold to a purchaser. The House of Lords ruled that contract could not be used to lessen the rights of end user purchasers, at least purchasers of consumer products such as motor cars.

== Subsequent decisions ==
=== Static Control ===
In Static Control Components, Inc. v. Lexmark Int'l, Inc., the district court reconsidered its decision in this case and granted a judgment as a matter of law (JMOL) in favor of the alleged infringer. The court said that the Supreme Court's Quanta decision had "changed the landscape of the doctrine of patent exhaustion generally, and specifically" required a reversal of the judgment, so that SCCI was not liable to Lexmark for patent infringement.

Lexmark had sought to restrict the refilling of its toner cartridges by relying on the Mallinckrodt doctrine. However, it did not enter into any conventional bilateral contract selling the toner cartridges to the public on a "conditional sale" basis. Instead, Lexmark relied on "shrinkwrap licenses," and restrictive notices accompanying the products. The court considered these ineffective to prevent application of the exhaustion doctrine, despite Mallinckrodt's approval of their use.

The court acknowledged that, "[a]s Lexmark points out, the Supreme Court did not expressly overrule Mallinckrodt in its Quanta opinion." Nonetheless, the court concluded:

After reviewing Quanta, Mallinckrodt, and the parties' arguments, this Court is persuaded that Quanta overruled Mallinckrodt sub silentio. The Supreme Court's broad statement of the law of patent exhaustion simply cannot be squared with the position that the Quanta holding is limited to its specific facts. Further, the Federal Circuit relied in part on Mallinckrodt in reaching its decision in LG Electronics, Inc. v. Bizcom Electronics, Inc., 453 F.3d 1364, 1369 (Fed. Cir. 2006), the decision the Supreme Court reversed in Quanta. It is also worth noting that the Quanta decision did not mention a single Federal Circuit case.

However, the court did not consider Quanta to have foreclosed the enforcement of the shrinkwrap restrictions under state contract law. The contract law aspects of the case became moot, however, because Lexmark voluntarily dismissed its claims of Static Control's tortious interference with contract.

=== Impression Products ===
In April 2015, the Federal Circuit sua sponte called for briefing and amicus curiae participation in an en banc consideration of whether Mallinckrodt should be overruled in light of the recent Supreme Court decision in the Quanta case. The court ordered:

In light of Quanta Computer, Inc. v. LG Electronics, Inc., 553 U.S. 617 (2008), should this court overrule Mallinckrodt, Inc. v. Medipart, Inc., 976 F.2d 700 (Fed. Cir. 1992), to the extent it ruled that a sale of a patented article, when the sale is made under a restriction that is otherwise lawful and within the scope of the patent grant, does not give rise to patent exhaustion?

== See also ==
- JVC Kenwood Corp. v. Nero, Inc.
