= Exhaustion doctrine under U.S. law =

See also Exhaustion of intellectual property rights for a general introduction not limited to U.S. law.

The exhaustion doctrine is a U.S. common law patent doctrine that limits the extent to which patent holders can control an individual article of a patented product after a so-called authorized sale. Under the doctrine, once an authorized sale of a patented article occurs, the patent holder's exclusive rights to control the use and sale of that article are said to be "exhausted," and the purchaser is free to use or resell that article without further restraint from patent law. However, under the repair and reconstruction doctrine, the patent owner retains the right to exclude purchasers of the articles from making the patented invention anew (i.e., making another article), unless it is specifically authorized by the patentee to do so.

Procedurally, the patent exhaustion doctrine operates as an affirmative defense, shielding authorized purchasers from infringement claims concerning the sale or use (including repair and modification) of a patented product after the patent owner authorized its sale.

Because only an "authorized" sale triggers the doctrine, it may be difficult or at least controversial to determine whether the exhaustion doctrine applies in a particular case: for example, when the patentee purports to restrict or condition the use or resale of the patented article once purchased and in the hands of an end user (post-sale restrictions); or when the patentee licenses another to manufacture and use or sell the patented product only in a particular field. The 2008 Supreme Court decision in Quanta Computer, Inc. v. LG Electronics, Inc., arguably leaves unclear the extent to which patentees can avoid the exhaustion doctrine by means of so-called limited licenses (licenses limited to a specified field of use). Since its development by the courts in the late 19th century, the patent exhaustion doctrine has raised questions regarding the scope of exclusive rights granted by patents and the extent to which a patent owner may extend those rights to control downstream use and sales of patented articles.

== Overview ==
A patent gives the patent owner the right to exclude others from making, using, selling, offering for sale, or importing into the U.S. the patented invention (i.e., a product embodying the invention) during the term of the patent. The constitutional rationale behind providing these exclusive rights is to "promote the Progress of Science and useful Arts" by providing inventors the incentive to invest their time, labor, and funds in researching and developing innovative technology. Providing these protections, however, comes with social costs (monopoly rents) and limits the public's ability to freely alienate patented goods. Thus, public policy dictates that the patent owner's exclusive rights be limited in scope. Generally, when a patent owner receives compensation for the use of his or her invention through sale of a patented product, the purpose of patent law is fulfilled with respect to that product. Upon receiving compensation, the patent owner's rights to exclude others are exhausted and "the patent law affords no basis for restraining the use and enjoyment of the thing sold." Accordingly, a patent owner's voluntary introduction of a patented product into commerce without restriction prevents the patent owner from exercising any claimed right to exclude others from using or reselling the sold product.

Unlike the analogous first-sale doctrine in copyright, the patent exhaustion doctrine has not been codified into the patent statute, and is thus still a common law doctrine. It was first explicitly recognized by the Supreme Court in 1873 in Adams v. Burke. In that case, the patentee Adams assigned to another the right to make, use, and sell patented coffin lids only within a ten-mile radius of Boston. Burke (an undertaker), a customer of the assignee, bought the coffin lids from the manufacturer-assignee within the ten-mile radius, but later used (and effectively resold) the patented coffin lids outside of the ten-mile radius, in his trade in the course of burying a person. The patentee Adams sued the undertaker Burke for patent infringement, but the Supreme Court found no infringement liability: Once the coffin lids were lawfully made and sold, "there is no restriction on their use to be implied for the benefit of the patentee or his assignees or licensees." Because the sale was authorized (bought from an authorized seller within the ten-mile radius), the defendant acquired the right to use the coffin lids free from any claim of the patentee, even though he carried it outside the ten-mile radius to use it.

== Limitations ==
The exhaustion doctrine is triggered only by a sale authorized by the patent holder. Thus, there are circumstances where it may be difficult to determine whether the exhaustion doctrine is triggered, in light of restrictions that the patentee has purported to place on the sale or use of the patented invention. Two general questions arise in these situations: (1) Was the sale authorized by the patentee? This can often be a complex factual question. (2) Regardless of whether authorized by the patentee, are those restrictions valid and recognizable under the law?

Generally, these cases involve one or more of the following scenarios: the patent owner: (1) sells one or more components of a multi-component patented product; (2) licenses another to make and sell patented product with certain restrictions on field in which the sale may be made; or (3) sells the article with restrictions directly on the purchasers or end-users (post-sale restraint).

=== Sale of incomplete articles ===
One scenario in which the exhaustion doctrine may or may not be triggered is when the patent holder sells an incomplete article or precursor or ingredient that does not directly practice or embody the patent in suit. In this situation, exhaustion is triggered by the authorized sale of the incomplete article if: (1) its "only reasonable and intended use was to practice the patent, and (2) it "embodies essential features" of the patented invention. Even if the exhaustion doctrine is applicable to the sale of an incomplete article, however, there is a separate analysis of whether the sale of that article was actually authorized, and therefore whether exhaustion was actually triggered.

The applicability of exhaustion to the sale of an incomplete article was recognized by the Supreme Court in 1942 in United States v. Univis Lens Co.. In that case, the patent holder sold lens blanks which had to be ground into finished lenses — the patented invention. The Court held that this sale exhausted the patents on the finished lenses because the lens blanks substantially "embodi[ed] essential features of the patented device and [were] without utility until . . . ground and polished as the finished lens of the patent." The Court noted that the grinding process was standard (conventional) and not central to the patents, indicating further that the lens blanks constituted a material part of the patented invention and all but completely practiced the patent, since only conventional further processing steps were needed to complete the invention.

In Quanta, the Supreme Court applied the same test to determine whether exhaustion is triggered by the licensing of a portfolio of product and method patents. In that case, the patent holder (LGE) authorized the licensee (Intel) by cross-license to manufacture and sell microprocessors and chipsets that (unless licensed) would infringe LGE product and method patents, as well as patents on computer systems containing the licensed microprocessors and chipsets. The Court found that, even though these Intel products did not directly practice the system patents, they sufficiently embodied the inventions of those patents, making the exhaustion doctrine applicable. First, the Court found that there was no reasonable use for the Intel products other than incorporating them into a computer system that practiced the LGE system patents. Second, the Intel products embodied essential features of the patented processes because the only necessary step to practice the patents was the addition of such standard computer parts as memories and buses. In addition, there was nothing inventive about the systems other than that they contained the inventive microprocessors and chipsets. Thus, under the Univis test, the Intel products sufficiently embodied the patents, making the exhaustion doctrine applicable.

=== Limitations on sale ===
Another scenario in which it may be difficult to determine if the sale of a patented article was authorized, and therefore if exhaustion is triggered, occurs when the patentee grants a license to make and sell with specific limitations on the field in which the seller may operate, such as sales to particular types of customer, specified territories, or other field-of-use limitations. If these limitations (or "restrictions") have been imposed, the licensee's sale to a purchaser exhausts only the patentee's rights to restrict use and resale when the restrictions have not been exceeded ("violated"). The theory is that if Alice owns Blackacre but not Whiteacre, she cannot convey good title to Bob by purporting to sell him Whiteacre. She can sell only what she owns. If the license limitations ("restrictions") are exceeded ("violated"), then exhaustion cannot occur and therefore is not triggered, and the patentee can successfully sue the licensee and any downstream customers for patent infringement.

The Supreme Court in General Talking Pictures Corp. v. Western Electric Co. has specifically upheld the legitimacy of field-of-use limitations in patent licenses to manufacture patented products. A licensee who exceeds ("violates") a field-of-use limitation by selling an article outside of the permissible field commits patent infringement. The exhaustion doctrine would provide no protection because the "violation" makes the sale "unauthorized" for the purposes of the exhaustion doctrine.

The field-of-use limitations on sale (those imposed on the licensee in selling the patented articles) are different from post-sale restrictions or limitations (those that purpose to restrict the use or sale of the patented article once purchased and in the hands of an end user). Patentees can avoid the exhaustion doctrine by imposing the former, but it is questionable that patentees can do so through the latter.

Limitations on sale must very explicitly bind the licensee or seller. For example, in Quanta, LGE licensed Intel to make products using LGE's patents. The license expressly stated that LGE was not licensing third parties to combine licensed products with any non-Intel products (i.e., microprocessors and chipsets purchased from a third party), and LGE required Intel to notify customers of that. Intel sold products to Quanta, who combined the Intel products with non-Intel products. LGE sued Quanta for patent infringement. The Supreme Court found that the licensing agreement failed to explicitly impose a field-of-use limitation, and therefore found that there were no conditions limiting to whom Intel could sell. The sale was thus "authorized," and exhaustion was triggered. In the Court's words, "The License Agreement authorized Intel to sell products that practiced the patents. No conditions limited Intel's authority to sell products substantially embodying the patents. . . . Intel's authorized sale to Quanta thus took its products outside the scope of the patent monopoly, and as a result, LGE can no longer assert its patent rights against Quanta."

Because the contractual documents in the Quanta case were insufficiently explicit, the Court applied the exhaustion doctrine, finding the sale "authorized" and unconditional, even though LGE attempted to impose some restrictions on use of the products. Therefore, purchasers of the patented product were free to use them without restrictions that the patentee sought to have imposed on them. The Court found that the licensing agreement did not impose any limitations on whom the licensee could sell to. The Quanta Court did not address, however, whether the restriction in the licensing agreement could be enforced by contract. In fact, the Court pointedly said it was not addressing that issue.

=== Post-sale limitations ===
The most difficult and unsettled area of the law regarding patent exhaustion involves cases in which a patentee purports to impose post-sale restrictions. Post-sale restrictions are those that purport to restrict the use or sale of the patented article once purchased and in the hands of an end user customer, rather than similar limitations on a manufacturer-licensee. Common post-sale restrictions include "single use only" and "refill only with proprietary ink" notices. Whether violations of such restrictions make a sale "unauthorized," and therefore make patent exhaustion inapplicable, is still unclear or at least controversial.

In 1992, the Federal Circuit approved the use of post-sale restrictions in Mallinckrodt, Inc. v. Medipart, Inc.. Specifically, the court held that patent owners could condition the sale of patented goods with a restrictive notice and thereby restrict the disposition of the goods by the purchasers, with the exception of such antitrust law violations as price-fixing and tie-in restrictions, or violations of "some other law or policy." The plaintiff in the case owned a patent on a medical device, which it sold to hospitals with a "single use only" notice label. The defendant purchased the used devices from hospitals, refurbished them, and resold them to hospitals. The Federal Circuit held that the single-use restriction was enforceable in accordance with the 1926 General Electric case, because the restriction was "reasonably within the patent grant. . . ."

The Supreme Court did not discuss the Mallinckrodt case in Quanta. As one commentator noted: "The Supreme Court, in Quanta, was widely expected to rule on whether Mallinckrodt was good law. But the Court sidestepped the issue by narrowly interpreting the license agreement so that it was not a conditional license. . . . Because the Supreme Court sidestepped the issue, it remains unclear to what extent a patentee can use a conditional license to impose restrictions on downstream purchasers."

At least two district courts have concluded that Mallinckrodt is no longer good law after Quanta. In Static Control Components, Inc. v. Lexmark Int'l, Inc., the court concluded that the Supreme Court's Quanta decision implicitly overruled Mallinckrodt. At issue in Static Control was Lexmark's so called "prebate" program, in which customers could buy cartridges that were subject to a single use for a 20 percent discounted price. In its original order, before Quanta was decided, the court rejected Static Control's argument that Lexmark's patent rights were exhausted as a result of the authorized sale of the cartridges. Relying heavily on Mallinckrodt, the court found that the sales were valid post-sale restrictions that avoided exhaustion. After Quanta was decided, however, the court reversed its original order and concluded that Lexmark's single use restriction was not enforceable under patent law because the court was "persuaded that Quanta overruled Mallinckrodt sub silentio." The court explained, "The Supreme Court's broad statement of the law of patent exhaustion simply cannot be squared with the position that the Quanta holding is limited to its specific facts. Further, the Federal Circuit relied in part on Mallinckrodt in reaching its decision in LG Electronics, Inc. v. Bizcom Electronics, Inc., 453 F.3d 1364, 1369 (Fed. Cir. 2006), the decision the Supreme Court reversed in Quanta. It is also worth noting that the Quanta decision did not mention a single Federal Circuit case."

The district court's conclusion, however, that Quanta overruled Mallinckrodt reflects the ambiguity in Quanta itself. The Static Control court noted that "[s]ales of Lexmark Prebate cartridges were unconditional" because "[n]o potential buyer was required to agree to abide by the Prebate terms before purchasing a cartridge. Thus, sales of Lexmark's Prebate toner cartridges were authorized and unconditional, just like sales of LGE's patented products in Quanta."

Therefore, both Quanta and Static Control can be seen as either cautionary tales about failed attempts to comply with the General Talking Pictures doctrine or to explicitly condition sales, without need to rule on whether the post-sale restrictions were valid, or as overruling Mallinckrodt's approval of post-sale restrictions. Which interpretation is correct remains to be seen. The Federal Circuit's decision in the en banc reargument of Lexmark Int'l v. Impression Prods. should provide a more definitive answer, subject of course to possible further review in the Supreme Court.

== International exhaustion ==
An emerging issue is whether U.S. patent exhaustion is international or strictly national. Until recently, or at least since the formation of the Federal Circuit in 1982 until recently, most U.S. courts simply assumed that a sale outside the United States, even if made by the U.S. patent owner or its parent, subsidiary, or affiliate, or by the U.S. patent owner's licensee, did not trigger the exhaustion doctrine within the United States. Usually, the basis for the assumption was (1) the Supreme Court allegedly so held in Boesch v. Graff; (2) a foreign patent is a different property right that is not the same as a corresponding U.S. patent because foreign patent law is different from U.S. patent law and gives different scope to such a foreign patent; and (3) many cases hold that U.S. patent law has no "extraterritorial" application.

None of these points is on firm, sound ground. In the Boesch case, a seller entirely unrelated to the U.S. patent owner made the sale in Germany; the German seller had a right to sell the product under German law because it had begun preparation to manufacture the product before the U.S. patent owner applied for its German patent. The U.S. company (the patentee) had no complicity in the sale and did not profit from it, and could not possibly be accused of "double dipping." This is quite unlike the usual U.S. situation, such as that in the Lexmark and Jazz cases, in which the U.S. patent owner was responsible for the foreign sale, and therefore profited from it. The Boesch case is therefore not a proper precedent to support the general international exhaustion situation.

Whether foreign patents are comparable to U.S. patents is a factual issue that may differ from case to case, or nation to nation, and cannot be assumed one way or the other. Furthermore, 35 U.S.C. § 119(a), the U.S. patent statute governing when a U.S. patent can be based on a filing of a foreign patent application, provides that the U.S. patent and the corresponding foreign patent must be "for the same invention." Therefore, there may be far more similarity than the cases assume.

Finally, the statement that U.S. patent law is without extraterritorial application occurs universally in cases holding that liability for patent infringement under U.S. law should not be based on acts and conduct occurring outside the United States. And even that generality is suspect, for sometimes patent infringement liability in the United States is based on conduct outside the United States. Applying exhaustion on an international basis does not regulate acts and conduct performed outside the United States; it defines infringement remedies against importation into and sale in the United States on the basis of acts and conduct performed outside the United States.

The point is now pending decision in the Federal Circuit, because that court has ordered en banc rehearing on that issue in the Lexmark case. The reason that the issue has come to the fore is that the Supreme Court, in its recent copyright decision in Kirtsaeng v. John Wiley & Sons, Inc., held that a foreign sale authorized by the copyright owners exhausts U.S. copyright. The Supreme Court rested its decision mainly on common-law authority, quoting extensively from Coke's Institutes (Coke on Littleton), and saying that this stated the general rule from which any exception must be proved. Some have thought, therefore, that the same principle applies at least as forcefully in patent law as in copyright law, so that patent exhaustion should be international just as copyright exhaustion is.

In Europe and Japan, a regime of absolute or modified international exhaustion of patent rights is followed. Australia, New Zealand, and Norway also adopt international patent exhaustion.

The World Trade Organization (WTO) Agreement on Trade Related Aspects of Intellectual Property Rights (TRIPS) explicitly leaves to each member state the freedom to address exhaustion of intellectual property. A World Intellectual Property Organization (WIPO) report in 2010 provides a listing of various countries' statutory provisions on international exhaustion.

== Standing or right to assert exhaustion ==
Another emerging issue under the exhaustion doctrine is what persons may assert the exhaustion doctrine as a defense to a claim of patent infringement. In most of the exhaustion cases discussed earlier in this article, the facts of the case follow what may be termed a "straight line" pattern: A patentee A (or its licensee) makes and sells a product a covered by patent P1 to customer C. C then does something with a that A has ordered (by some sort of agreement or putative agreement) C not to do. A patent infringement suit, A v. C, follows. Diagrammatically, this fact pattern may be represented as:

A → a (P1) → C

- where a(P1) means that patent P1 covers product a and the → indicates a sale

New information-technology inventions can lead to exhaustion suits following a different fact pattern, because of peculiarities of information technology and present U.S. patent law. An information-technology invention may involve several aspects each of which has a separate stakeholder. For example, a smartphone, TV set, or set-top box may be economically important to both equipment manufacturers and content providers, as well as the end user public (i.e., consumers). A license or sale to one stakeholder may or may not trigger the exhaustion doctrine with respect to conduct by another stakeholder, perhaps depending on how relevant business transactions are structured.

Under present U.S. patent law, a method claim of a patent is infringed only when a single actor performs each step of the claim. Similarly, induced infringement of a method claim has the same requirement. System claims raise more complicated issues. One can make the system only by placing each element into combination with the others, but it is possible to be liable for using a system invention merely by commercially exploiting the system. Therefore, when both the relevant equipment manufacturer and content provider utilize aspects of the invention in a method claim, whether infringement liability attaches to them may depend on both how the relevant claim is written and how licenses or sales are structured. This is illustrated in pending smartphone litigation, in which structure dictated the legal outcome.

In Helferich Patent Licensing, LLC v. New York Times Co., the Federal Circuit overturned a district court's summary dismissal on exhaustion grounds of a patent infringement suit against content providers. The invention concerns methods and systems for alerting smartphone users to content that may be of interest to them, for example, breaking news stories. The way the invention works is along these lines: A content provider such as the New York Times sends a text message to its online subscribers' smartphones. The message might consist of a headline and the lead to a story, together with a hyperlink to the story as stored in the online database of the New York Times. A subscriber interested in reading the story clicks on the link and thus causes the browser for the smartphone to retrieve and display the story.

The way the claims were drafted is very important to the outcome. There are two relevant types of claim, One set considers only smartphone manufacturers, and the claims describe only acts performed in the smartphone (receiving signals, clicking on hyperlinks, etc.). The other set of claims considers only acts that the content providers perform (sending the text message alert, storing the news story, sending it out over the Internet in response to a hyperlink click, etc.). Thus, it is possible to infringe one set of these single-actor claims without infringing the other.

The patentee licensed substantially all smartphone manufacturers in the United States under the first set of patents. It then sought to license content providers. When some content providers, including the New York Times, refused to take licenses under the second set of patents, claiming that under the exhaustion doctrine they needed no licenses, the patentee sued them. Instead of the "straight line" fact pattern described above for prior exhaustion cases, this case has a different, bi-directional pattern. Diagrammatically, the fact pattern of this type of case is as follows:

P → lic (P1) → A, a

- Patentee P licenses manufacturer A under patent P1 (the smartphone patents) to make smartphones a embodying the patented invention. A then sells smartphones a to consumers C.

A → a (P1) → C ← i (P2) ← B

- Content provider B sends news alerts and content i to consumers C, thus practicing the method claimed in patent P2 (the content provider patents).

On appeal from the district court's summary judgment ruling, the Federal Circuit held that the structure of the patent licensing arrangement avoided the exhaustion doctrine. The court ruled that the exhaustion doctrine may be asserted only by an "authorized acquirer" — one who purchases the patented article from the patentee or its authorized seller. The court further explained this, using slightly different terminology:

[It is a] core notion that exhaustion lifts legal restrictions on an authorized acquirer. The doctrine has never applied unless, at a minimum, the patentee's allegations of infringement . . . entail infringement of the asserted claims by authorized acquirers . . . Here, as noted, that is not so, because infringement of the content claims has not been . . . shown to require that [the authorized] handset acquirers are practicing those claims.

As the patentee put it in its brief, and the court accepted, "the exhaustion doctrine protects only the ability of a purchaser (or other lawful possessor) of an article to use and sell the article." The content providers were not parties to the transaction that triggered whatever exhaustion there was — that transaction was the sale of smartphones by manufacturers to consumers. The exhaustion doctrine exists to protect the interests of purchasers, not third parties. The patentee told the Federal Circuit, and it apparently agreed, that the exhaustion doctrine does not immunize the conduct of the content providers, "regardless of the effect on the amount of licensed content available to their subscribers' handsets."

Moreover, the patent claims licensed to the manufacturers (the P1 of the diagram above) are not infringed by the conduct of the content providers accused of infringement. Their conduct infringes the P2 patent claims that were not licensed to the manufacturers. The only sale in the case was by the licensed smartphone manufacturers to the consumer end users, and that sale exhausted only the P1 claims. The Federal Circuit said exhaustion cannot occur as to unrelated patent claims. The court added that the content providers had not shown that the licensed P1 claims embodied substantially the same invention as the P2 patent claims under which the content providers were sued, so that the doctrine of the Univis and Quanta cases did not apply to expand the scope of the exhaustion.

There is another possible way to analyze cases of this type, but the parties did not raise it and the court did not address it. That would be to make an equitable estoppel analysis as to whether smartphone purchasers had reasonable expectations at the time of purchase and whether the result reached in the case unfairly and substantially derogated from the rights the purchasers expected to enjoy, as a result of conduct by the plaintiff. That is an approach similar to one of those that the House of Lords considered in the British Leyland case.

== Comparable doctrines outside U.S. ==
Other countries recognize legal doctrines comparable to the exhaustion doctrine of U.S. patent law.

=== Canada ===
In Eli Lilly and Co. v. Apotex Inc., the Supreme Court of Canada adopted the principle that sale of a patented article exhausts the patentee's right in that article. In the Eli Lilly case the Supreme Court also took the position that subsequent purchasers are not bound by any contractual limitations imposed by the patentee, unless they are brought to their attention at the time of sale: "restrictive conditions imposed by a patentee on a purchaser or licensee do not run with the goods unless they are brought to the attention of the [subsequent] purchaser at the time of their acquisition." This principle appears to differ somewhat from U.S. patent law, in which bringing the restriction to the attention of the purchaser is generally immaterial.

=== Germany ===
Approximately 60 percent of European patent litigation is in German courts. German law has long recognized the exhaustion doctrine. In the Fullplastverfahren case, the German Federal Supreme Court stated:

The doctrine [of exhaustion] finds its justification in the argument that the holder of the rights who puts into circulation the product produced under the application of the protected procedure has had the opportunity to avail himself of the advantages granted by the patent.

A commentator asserts that the decision of the German Federal Supreme Court in the Brochure Rock case would require a contrary result as to the fact pattern of the U.S. Quanta case (discussed above). The sale of the chips would not exhaust the patent rights to the computer systems containing the chips, so that LG in that case would have been entitled to a further royalty payment from Quanta despite LG's license to the chip manufacturer Intel.

A recent decision of the Düsseldorf District Court, however, perhaps points to greater similarity between German and U.S.; patent law. The case had facts almost identical to those of the Quanta case. The court held that the sale of the component did not exhaust the patent rights on the system because, among other things, the components sold by the suppliers did not make use of the teachings of the system patent.

As for using the doctrine of the U.S. Quanta case, the Düsseldorf District Court stated that the rationale for such an "extended exhaustion doctrine" could only be to prevent the patent owner from enjoying the advantages of the patent more than once, that is, "double dipping" or "double charging." The court said that such a danger of double charging at different stages of the distribution chain and, thus, a rationale for an "extended exhaustion doctrine," might exist if, in one and the same patent, there is a claim to the overall device and a claim to an individual component of the overall device. That was not the case here.

A second basis for an "extended exhaustion doctrine" might exist if the overall device and its individual components are protected by different patents (as here), but only when the inventive concept of the two patents is the same and is substantially embodied in the component. But that was not true here, as it was in the Quanta case. This is the point of possible similarity to Quanta, but it is entirely in the form of obiter dicta,

The court ruled that the fact that the component had no reasonable use except in making the patented system (which was so in the Quanta case) did not matter, because that raised an implied license issue rather than an exhaustion issue. The component manufacturer's license expressly disclaimed any such implied license as to the system (as in the Quanta case).
