= General Talking Pictures Corp. v. Western Electric Co. =

- Supreme Court of the United States

Argued December 13–4, 1937 Reargued October 19–20, 1938 Decided November 21, 1938
- Full case name: General Talking Pictures Corp. v. Western Elec. Co.
- Citations: 304 U.S. 175 (more) 58 S. Ct. 849; 82 L. Ed. 1273; 1938 U.S. LEXIS 1134; 37 U.S.P.Q. 357

Case history
- Prior: Affirmed, 91 F.2d 922 (2d Cir. 1937)
- Subsequent: Affirmed on rehearing, 305 U.S. 124 (1938).

Holding
- The owner of a patent may lawfully restrict his licensee to manufacture and sale of the patented invention for use in only one or some of several distinct fields in which it is useful, excluding him from the others. Where a licensee, so restricted, makes and sells the patented article for a use outside the scope of his license, he is an infringer, and his vendee, buying with knowledge of the facts, is likewise an infringer. Affirmed.

Court membership
- Chief Justice Charles E. Hughes Associate Justices James C. McReynolds · Louis Brandeis; Pierce Butler · Harlan F. Stone; Owen Roberts · Hugo Black; Stanley F. Reed

Case opinions
- Majority: Butler, joined by Hughes, McReynolds, Sutherland, Stone
- Dissent: Black

Laws applied
- Rev. Stat. § 4886, as amended, 35 U.S.C. § 31

General Talking Pictures Corp. v. Western Electric Co., 304 U.S. 175 (1938), was a case that the Supreme Court of the United States decided in 1938. The decision upheld so-called field-of-use limitations in patent licenses: it held that the limitations were enforceable in a patent infringement suit in federal court against the licensee and those acting in concert with it—for example, a customer that knowingly buys a patented product from the licensee that is outside the scope of the license.

A field-of-use limitation is a provision in a patent license that limits the scope of what the patent owner authorizes a manufacturing licensee (that is, a licensee that manufactures a patented product or performs a patented process) to use the patent to make a specified product or do specified things. The license specifies a defined field of permissible operation or specifies fields from which the licensee is excluded. By way of example, such a license might authorize a licensee to manufacture patented engines only for incorporation into trucks, or to manufacture such engines only for sale to farmers, or only engines rated from 100 to 200 horsepower. More generally, this kind of license permits the licensee to use the patented invention in some, but not all, possible ways in which the invention could be exploited. In an exclusive field-of-use license the licensee is the only person authorized to use the invention in the field of the license.

The General Talking Pictures doctrine does not apply to all cases in which a patent owner imposes a restriction on what may subsequently be done with the patented product. When the patent owner sells a patented product to a customer, for example, the exhaustion doctrine applies instead and the patent no longer operates to limit what the customer does with the product or in what field the customer uses it.

== Factual background ==
AT&T owned patents on vacuum tubes (which the majority opinion termed “amplifiers”) and licensed the patents to Transformer Company to manufacture tubes for use in the field of home radios, or small, so-called noncommercial amplifiers. AT&T licensed other companies (its subsidiaries) in the field of so-called commercial use, or large amplifiers for use in theaters. The vacuum tubes used in the different fields were indistinguishable. Transformer Company sold its products to General Talking Pictures (GTP), which knew of the field-of-use limitation but (like Transformer Company) ignored it. AT&T sued GTP and Transformer Company.

== Supreme Court decision ==
=== Majority opinion ===
The majority upheld the arrangement as a well-known, legitimate expedient: “Patent owners may grant licenses extending to all uses or limited to use in a defined field.” The Transformer Company was only a nonexclusive licensee in a limited field, as it and General Talking Pictures knew. The Transformer Company had no rights outside its licensed field, and thus “could not convey to petitioner [General Talking Pictures] what both knew it was not authorized to sell.” The majority paid no attention to whether the so-called amplifiers were actually interchangeable shelf-item components of amplifying systems, a point that Justice Black emphasized in his dissent.

=== Dissenting opinion ===
Justice Black dissented. As he perceived it, and considered of great importance, the tubes that all licensees made were fungible, interchangeable articles of commerce, which the Transformer Company was authorized to manufacture. Once they left the manufacturing licensee's hands, who sold them to General Talking Pictures, they passed outside the patent monopoly:

The patent statute which permits a patentee to “make, use and vend” confers no power to fix and restrict the uses to which a merchantable commodity can be put after it has been bought in the open market from one who was granted authority to manufacture and sell it. Neither the right to make, nor the right to use, nor the right to sell a chattel, includes the right …to control the use of the same chattel by another who has purchased it. A license to sell a widely used merchantable chattel must be as to prospective purchasers…a transfer of the patentee's entire right to sell; it cannot — as to noncontracting parties — restrict the use of ordinary articles of purchase bought in the open market.

== Impact ==
The General Talking Pictures doctrine remains valid law, subject to possible antitrust exceptions (see below). The exhaustion doctrine does not operate to free from the patent monopoly product sales that a limited licensee makes to one who seeks to use the sold product outside the licensed field — at least when the buyer has notice of the limitation. Nonetheless, tension exists between the two doctrines — particularly when the field-of-use license is not as explicit as it might be. Then, as illustrated by the recent Supreme Court decision in Quanta Computer, Inc. v. LG Electronics, Inc., “default” rules take over. The default rules, which apply when a court interprets a license or other contract as ambiguous or not complete, are that the exhaustion doctrine governs over the General Talking Pictures doctrine in ambiguous cases. A use restriction in a license must be explicit to bind a seller, if it is to do so at all. Furthermore, the default rule for licenses to manufacture a patented product is that the license is unlimited, i.e., it covers all possible fields. Thus, a manufacturing license is unlimited unless its language explicitly provides otherwise. Because the contractual documents in the Quanta case were insufficiently explicit, or so the Supreme Court seemed to believe, the Court applied the exhaustion doctrine rather than the General Talking Pictures doctrine. Therefore, purchasers of the patented product were free to use them without restrictions that the patentee sought to have imposed on them.

== Antitrust exception ==
In some circumstances, field-of-use arrangements (particularly those of patent pools) may violate the antitrust laws. A set of field-of-use licenses may be used to allocate markets among competing manufacturers of a product with attendant price manipulation.

Thus, in Hartford-Empire Co. v. United States, the courts condemned a cartel among bottle manufacturers that operated by parceling out different markets to different members of the cartel. The members were given limited licenses in the respective markets allocated to them. This was held to violate the antitrust laws.

In Ethyl Gasoline Corp. v. United States, the defendant Ethyl had established an elaborate licensing program under its several patents on a fuel additive tetra-ethyl lead, a motor fuel containing tetra-ethyl lead, and a method of operating an automobile engine with fuel containing tetra-ethyl lead. Ethyl sold the fuel additive, and licensed purchasers to use it to practice the other patents. The licensing program fixed prices for the motor fuel and strictly limited the types of customer to which given licensees could sell the motor fuel. Ethyl emphasized to the Supreme Court the fact that while it sold the fuel subject to a post-sale restraint it licensed the other patents, which covered the manufacture of the fuel (by adding tetra-ethyl lead to ordinary gasoline) and the use of the fuel in automobile engines. Ethyl argued that the licensed patents and the manufacturing brought the case within the shelter of the General Talking Pictures doctrine. The Supreme Court refused to make any distinctions among the different patents and struck the whole program down for improperly “regimenting” the industry in violation of the antitrust laws.
