= Exhaustion of intellectual property rights =

Doctrine in intellectual property law

The exhaustion of intellectual property rights constitutes one of the limits of intellectual property (IP) rights. Once a given product has been sold under the authorization of the IP owner, the reselling, rental, lending and other third party commercial uses of IP-protected goods in domestic and international markets are governed by the principle.

After a product covered by an IP right, such as by a patent right, has been sold by the IP right owner or by others with the consent of the owner, the IP right is said to be exhausted. It can no longer be exercised by the owner. This limitation is also referred to as the exhaustion doctrine or first sale doctrine. For example, if an inventor obtains a patent on a new kind of umbrella, the inventor (or anyone else to whom he sells his patent) can legally prohibit other companies from making and selling this kind of umbrella, but cannot prohibit customers who have bought this umbrella from the patent owner from reselling the umbrella to third parties. Or if a piece of software containing a patented algorithm is distributed by the patent owner, then the patent is exhausted.

While there is a "fairly broad consensus" throughout the world that patent exhaustion "applies at least within the context of the domestic market", "[t]here is less consensus as to what extent the sale of an IP protected product abroad can exhaust the IP rights over this product in the context of domestic law." The former is the concept of "national exhaustion", the latter of "regional exhaustion" or "international exhaustion". The rules and legal implications of the exhaustion largely differ depending on the country of importation, i.e. the national jurisdiction.

The legal concept of international exhaustion is much more controversial, and is recognized in some countries but not in others. The importation, in a country that recognizes the concept of international exhaustion, of a product sold in a foreign country with the authorization of the IP right owner cannot be prevented by the IP right owner. The Agreement on Trade-Related Aspects of Intellectual Property Rights (TRIPS), an international agreement administered by the World Trade Organization (WTO), does not address the issue of exhaustion of intellectual property rights.

Brexit in 2020 caused restrictions on trade out of the UK, creating an asymmetric exhaustion status enabling imports to the UK from the EEA where there is no matching opportunity for parallel exports from the UK to the EEA. This was thought in February 2022 to be likely to continue for some time, or even indefinitely.

== See also ==
- Copyright Directive (Directive 2001/29/EC) (Article 4 relates to exhaustion)
- Exhaustion doctrine under U.S. law
- First-sale doctrine
- Right to property
