= Costco Wholesale Corp. v. Omega, S. A. =

Omega S. A. v. Costco Wholesale Corp.
- Court: United States Court of Appeals for the Ninth Circuit
- Full case name: Omega S. A. v. Costco Wholesale Corporation
- Decided: September 3, 2008
- Citation: 541 F.3d 982

Case history
- Prior action: Appeal from C.D. Cal. (2007 WL 7029735)
- Subsequent actions: Affirmed by an equally divided Supreme Court, No. 08-1423, 562 U.S. 40 (2010).

Court membership
- Judges sitting: Barry G. Silverman, Johnnie B. Rawlinson, Milan D. Smith, Jr.

Case opinions
- Majority: Smith, joined by Rawlinson, Silverman

Costco Wholesale Corp. v. Omega, S. A.
- Supreme Court of the United States

Argued November 8, 2010 Decided December 13, 2010
- Full case name: Costco Wholesale Corporation v. Omega, S. A.
- Citations: 562 U.S. 40 (more) 131 S. Ct. 565; 178 L. Ed. 2d 470; 96 U.S.P.Q.2d 2025

Case history
- Prior: 541 F.3d 982 (9th Cir. 2008); cert. granted, 559 U.S. 1066 (2010).

Holding
- Judgment affirmed by an equally divided Court.

Court membership
- Chief Justice John Roberts Associate Justices Antonin Scalia · Anthony Kennedy; Clarence Thomas · Ruth Bader Ginsburg; Stephen Breyer · Samuel Alito; Sonia Sotomayor · Elena Kagan

Case opinion
- Per curiam
- Kagan took no part in the consideration or decision of the case.

Laws applied
- Copyright Act of 1976

Omega S. A. v. Costco Wholesale Corp., 541 F.3d 982 (9th Cir. 2008), was a case decided by the Ninth Circuit Court of Appeals that held that in copyright law, the first-sale doctrine does not act as a defense to claims of infringing distribution and importation for unauthorized sale of authentic, imported watches that bore a design registered in the Copyright Office. It is contrasted with Kirtsaeng v. John Wiley & Sons, Inc.

== Factual background ==
The plaintiff, Omega SA, is a luxury watchmaker based in Switzerland that distributes its watches through authorized retailers. The Omega watches feature a copyrighted globe design on the back of the watch. The defendant Costco obtained the watches through the gray market: Omega would sell the watches to authorized distributors, third parties would buy the watches and sell them to the New York state company ENE Limited, and ENE would sell the watches to Costco. Omega did not authorize the importation or resale in the United States, and Omega sued for copyright infringement under 17 U.S.C. §§ 106(3) and 602(a). Costco asserted that the first-sale doctrine precluded any infringement claims against them. The trial court ruled in favor of Costco.

== Ninth Circuit decision ==
The Ninth Circuit reversed the trial court. The court cited Ninth Circuit precedents that interpreted the first-sale doctrine as applying only to goods made in the United States. The court found its interpretation to be consistent with the Supreme Court case Quality King v. L'anza, which held that the first-sale doctrine was a defense to an infringement claim based on unauthorized importation of copyrighted materials made within the United States. The court noted that the first-sale doctrine only covered the resale of copies obtained lawfully, and declined to apply the Copyright Act extraterritorially and ascribe lawfulness to copies made outside of the United States. Because the Omega watches at issue were made outside of the United States, the court held that the first-sale doctrine could not act as a defense and that Costco was liable for infringing Omega's importation rights.

== Supreme Court case ==
Certiorari to the Supreme Court of the United States was granted on April 19, 2010. Justice Kagan took no part in the consideration or decision of the case. She was the Solicitor General before the case came to the Supreme Court. The remaining Justices split 4–4, which means the Court affirms the Ninth Circuit's decision.

== Subsequent history ==
On remand to the district court, both Costco and Omega moved for summary judgment on the issue of copyright misuse. Judge Terry Hatter found for Costco, holding that Omega's application of a copyrighted work to an uncopyrighted watch for the purpose of controlling importation of the uncopyrighted good constituted copyright misuse.

On January 20, 2015, the Ninth Circuit Court of Appeals upheld the district court judgment, including awarding attorney's fees to Costco.

== Impact ==
The decision has been characterized as a loss for consumers in the sense that manufacturers will better be able to control the prices of their goods when the grey market cannot serve as competition. Also, the distinction drawn in the case between goods manufactured inside the United States and goods manufactured outside could be a possible motivation for companies to locate their manufacturing outside of the United States, where the first-sale doctrine would not stand as an obstacle to suing grey market importers.

As a 4–4 decision, however, Omega only operates as mandatory authority in the Ninth Circuit and does not set a nationwide precedent.

In December 2011, petitions for certiorari in two cases from the Second Circuit with a similar issue were filed in the Supreme Court, providing the Court with another opportunity to revisit the still-unresolved issue in Omega: Kirtsaeng v. John Wiley & Sons, Inc. and Liu v. Pearson Education In 2013, the U.S. Supreme Court reversed lower court rulings and ruled that Kirtsaeng's sale of lawfully-made copies purchased overseas was protected by the first-sale doctrine. Liu and another Pearson case were subsequently remanded to the lower courts to rehear, in light of Kirtsaeng.
