= Import license =

National government document authorizing the importation of goods

An import license, also called an import permit, is a document issued by a national government, which authorizes the importation of certain goods into its territory. Import licenses are considered to be non-tariff barriers to trade when used as a way to discriminate against another country's goods in order to protect a domestic industry from foreign competition.

Each license specifies the volume of imports allowed, and the total volume allowed should not exceed the quota. Licenses can be sold to importing companies at a competitive price, or simply a set fee. However, it is argued that this allocation method provides incentives for political lobbying and bribery. Governments may put certain restrictions on what is imported as well as the amount of imported goods and services. For example, if a business wishes to import agricultural products such as vegetables, then the government may be concerned about the impact of such importations of the local market and thus impose a restriction.

== Harmonized System ==
The Harmonized Commodity Description and Coding System, often referred to simply as the "Harmonized System" or "HS", is an international product nomenclature developed by the World Customs Organization (WCO). It consists of over 5,000 commodity groups, each identified by a six digit code.

The system is used by over 200 countries as a basis for their customs tariffs, and for the collection of international trade statistics. Over 98% of international trade merchandise is classified in terms of the HS.

== Système Intégré de Gestion de Licenses ==
The Système Intégré de Gestion de Licenses (SIGL) is the European Union Directorate General for Trade's integrated IT system for the management of licences for imports of textiles, clothing, footwear, steel and wood to the EU.

== See also ==
- Importation right
