= Absorption unit =

Absorption unit may refer to

- Gray (unit), SI unit of absorbed radiation dose
- Sabin (unit), unit of sound absorption
- A device which absorbs, such as a Dynamometer

== See also ==
- Absorption (disambiguation)
