= Import =

Good brought into a jurisdiction

Value of imported goods and services

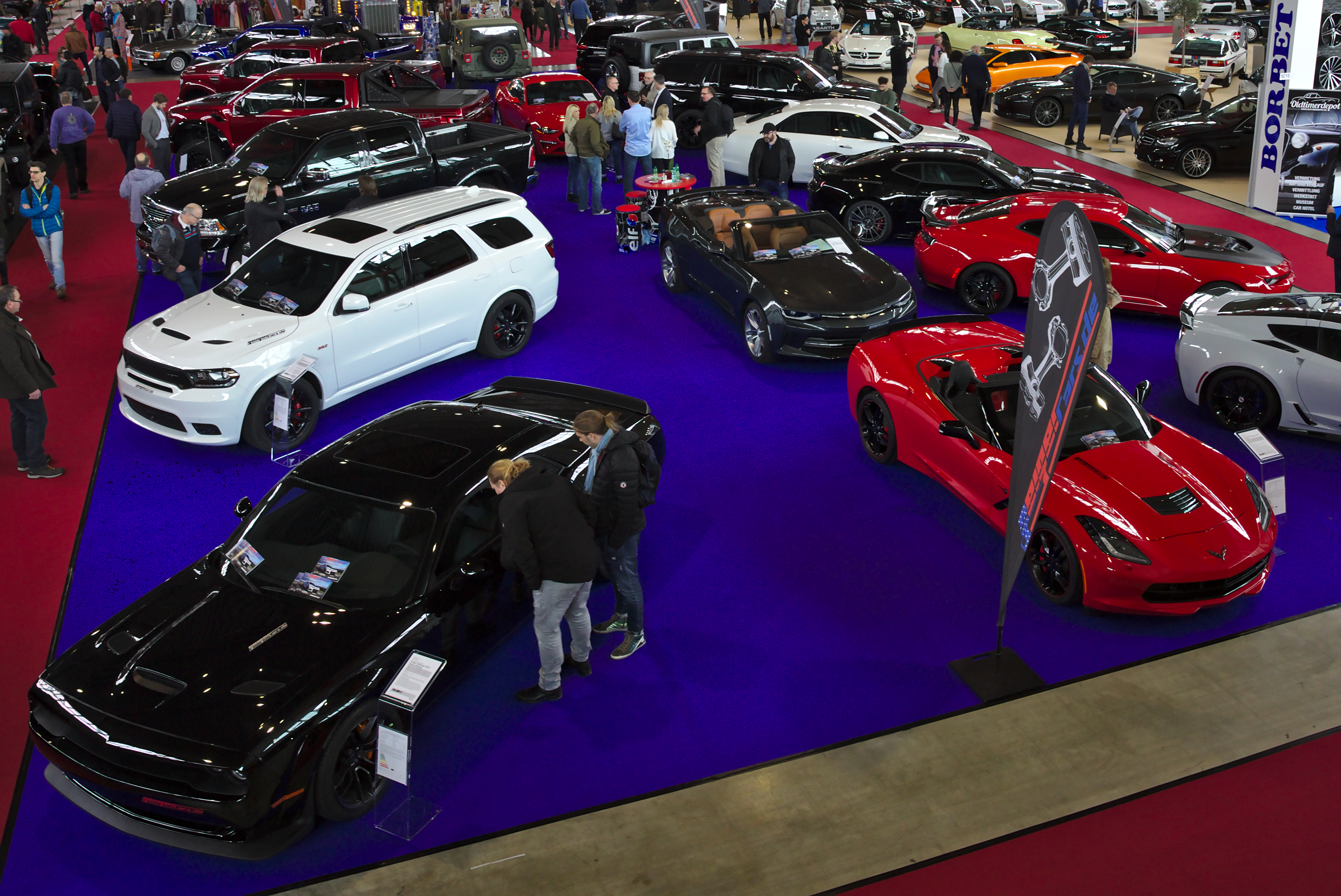
Geiger-cars, which imports cars from North America to Europe, is called an importer.

Import is the activity within international trade which involves buying and receiving goods and services produced in another country. An importer is a person, organization or country receiving imported goods which have been exported from another country. Importation and exportation are the defining financial transactions of international trade. The seller of such goods and services is called an exporter.

In international trade, the importation and exportation of goods are limited by import quotas and mandates from the customs authority. The importing and exporting jurisdictions may impose a tariff (tax) on the goods. In addition, the importation and exportation of goods are subject to trade agreements between the importing and exporting jurisdictions.

== Definition ==
Imports consist of transactions in goods and services to a resident of a jurisdiction (such as a nation) from non-residents. The exact definition of imports in national accounts includes and excludes specific "borderline" cases. Importation is the action of buying or acquiring products or services from another country or another market other than own. Imports are important for the economy because they allow a country to supply nonexistent, scarce, high cost, or low-quality certain products or services, to its market with products from other countries.

A general delimitation of imports in national accounts is given below:

- An import of a good occurs when there is a change of ownership from a non-resident to a resident; this does not necessarily imply that the good in question physically crosses the frontier. However, in specific cases, national accounts impute changes of ownership even though in legal terms no change of ownership takes place (e.g. cross border financial leasing, cross border deliveries between affiliates of the same enterprise, goods crossing the border for significant processing to order or repair). Also, smuggled goods must be included in the import measurement.
- Imports of services consist of all services rendered by non-residents to residents. In national accounts any direct purchases by residents outside the economic territory of a country are recorded as imports of services; therefore all expenditure by tourists in the economic territory of another country are considered part of the imports of services. Also, international flows of illegal services must be included.

== Scale ==
Basic trade statistics often differ in terms of definition and coverage from the requirements in the national accounts:

- Data on international trade in goods are mostly obtained through declarations to custom services. If a country applies the general trade system, all goods entering the country are recorded as imports. If the special trade system (e.g. extra-EU trade statistics) is applied goods that are received into customs warehouses are not recorded in external trade statistics unless they subsequently go into free circulation of the importing country.
- A special case is the intra-EU trade statistics. Since goods move freely between the member states of the EU without customs controls, statistics on trade in goods between the member states must be obtained through surveys. To reduce the statistical burden on the respondent's small-scale traders are excluded from the reporting obligation.
- Statistical recording of trade in services is based on declarations by banks to their central banks or by surveys of the main operators. In a globalized economy where services can be rendered via electronic means (e.g. internet) the related international flows of services are difficult to identify.
- Basic statistics on international trade normally do not record smuggled goods or international flows of illegal services. A small fraction of the smuggled goods and illegal services may nevertheless be included in official trade statistics through dummy shipments or dummy declarations that serve to conceal the illegal nature of the activities.

The United States is said to be the world's largest importer. From 2016 to 2021, the US spent $15 trillion on importing goods from around the world.

== Balance of trade ==
A country has demand for an import when the price of the good (or service) on the world market is less than the price on the domestic market.

The balance of trade, usually denoted $NX$, is the difference between the value of all the goods (and services) a country exports and the value of the goods the country imports. A trade deficit occurs when imports are larger than exports. Imports are impacted principally by a country's income and its productive resources. For example, the US imports oil from Canada even though the US has oil and Canada uses oil. However, consumers in the US are willing to pay more for the marginal barrel of oil than Canadian consumers are, because there is more oil demanded in the US than there is oil produced. In 2016, only about 30% of countries had a trade surplus. Most trade experts and economists argue that it is wrong to automatically assume a trade deficit is harmful to a country's economy.

In macroeconomic theory, the value of imports can be modeled as a function of domestic absorption (spending on everything, regardless of source) and the real exchange rate. These are the two most important factors affecting imports and they both affect imports positively.

== Types of import ==
There are two basic types of import:

- Industrial and consumer goods
- Intermediate goods and services

Companies import goods and services to supply to the domestic market at a cheaper price and better quality than competing goods manufactured in the domestic market. Companies import products that are not available in the local market.

There are three broad types of importers:

- Those looking for any product around the world to import and sell
- Those looking for foreign sourcing to get their products at the cheapest price
- Those who using foreign sourcing as part of their global supply chain

Direct-import refers to a type of business importation involving a major retailer (e.g. Wal-Mart) and an overseas manufacturer. A retailer typically purchases products designed by local companies that can be manufactured overseas. In a direct-import program, the retailer bypasses the local supplier (colloquial: "middle-man") and buys the final product directly from the manufacturer, possibly saving in added cost data on the value of imports and their quantities often broken down by detailed lists of products are available in statistical collections on international trade published by the statistical services of intergovernmental organisations (e.g. UNSD, FAOSTAT, OECD), supranational statistical institutes (e.g. Eurostat) and national statistical institutes.

=== Import of goods ===
Importation, declaration, and payment of customs duties are done by the importer of record, which may be the owner of the goods, the purchaser, or a licensed customs broker.

=== Import bans ===
An import ban is a legal action or policy measure that prevents importers from bringing a certain category of goods into a country, or prohibits the imports of specific goods from one or more countries. Examples include the provisions in the United States' Smoot–Hawley Tariff Act banning the import of goods produced overseas using convict labor, bans which have been imposed by the United States on importing Japanese beef, and the ban imposed by the People's Republic of China on imports of Taiwanese pineapples.

== See also ==
- Export function
- Importation right
- List of countries by imports
