= Parallel import =

Importation without permission from intellectual property owner

A parallel import is a non-counterfeit product imported from another country without the permission of the intellectual property owner. Parallel imports are often referred to as grey products, and are implicated in issues of international trade and intellectual property.

Parallel importing is based on the concept of exhaustion of intellectual property rights; according to this concept, when the product is first launched on the market in a particular jurisdiction, parallel importation is authorized to all residents of the state in question. Some countries allow it but others do not.

Parallel importing of pharmaceuticals reduces the prices of pharmaceuticals by introducing competition; the TRIPS Agreement, in Article 6, states that this practice cannot be challenged under the WTO dispute settlement system and so is effectively a matter of national discretion.

The practice of parallel importing is often advocated for in the cases of software, music, printed texts, and electronic products, and occurs for several reasons:

1. Different versions of a product are produced for sale in different markets. For example, the UK edition of Top Gear Magazine is officially sold in the UK, and Top Gear Australia is officially sold in Australia. However, some unofficial distributors in Australia also sell the UK edition of Top Gear Magazine.
2. Companies, either the manufacturer or the distributor, set different price points for their products in different markets. Parallel importers ordinarily purchase products in one country at a price (P1) which is cheaper than the price at which they are sold in a second country (P2), import the products into the second country, and benefitting from arbitrage, sell the products in that country at a price which is usually between P1 and P2.
3. Consumers who are able to obtain more competitively priced items and may be able to avoid local sales taxes, are placed on an even footing with consumers who have less access to overseas sales online.
4. Some advocacy groups support parallel importing on the grounds of enhancing the free flow of information.
5. Some consumers will parallel import as an act of protest against a local distributor that they believe has not treated them properly.

== International approach ==
Parallel importing is regulated differently in different jurisdictions; there is no consistency in laws dealing with parallel imports between countries. Neither the Berne Convention nor the Paris Convention explicitly prohibit parallel importation.

=== Australia ===
The Australian market is an example of a relatively small consumer market which does not benefit from the economies of scale and competition available in the larger global economies. Australia tends to have lower levels of competition in many industries and oligopolies are common in industries like banking, supermarkets, and mobile telecommunications.

Private enterprise will use product segmentation strategies to legally maximise profit. This often includes varying service levels, pricing and product features to improve the so-called "fit" to the local marketplace. However, this segmentation may mean identical products at higher prices. This can be termed price discrimination. With the advent of the Internet, Australian consumers can readily compare prices globally and have been able to identify products exhibiting price discrimination, also known as the "Australia Tax".

In 1991, the Australian Government resolved to remove parallel import restrictions from a range of products except cars. It followed this up with legislation making it legal to source music and software CDs from overseas and import them into Australia. An Australian Productivity Commission report recommended in July 2009 that legislation be extended to legalise the parallel importing of books, with three years' notice for publishers. The commission also recommended abolishing restrictions on parallel importing of cars.

The Federal Court of Australia decision has ruled that parallel imported items with valid trademarks are subject to Section 123 of the Trade Mark Act.

Various Australian Parliament committees have investigated allegations of price discrimination.

=== European Union/European Economic Area ===
The European Union (and European Economic Area) require the doctrine of international exhaustion to exist between member states, but EU legislation for trademarks, design rights and copyright prohibits its application to goods put on the market outside the EU/EEA.

=== Germany ===
In Germany, the Bundesgerichtshof has held that the doctrine of international exhaustion governs parallel importation, subject to the EU rules above.

=== Hong Kong ===
In Hong Kong, parallel importation is permitted under both the Trade Mark and (amended) Copyright Ordinance before The Copyright (Amendment) Ordinance 2007 came into force 6 July.

=== Japan ===
Japan's intellectual property rights law prohibits audiovisual articles marketed for export from being sold domestically, and such sale of "re-imported" CDs are illegal.

=== United States ===
In the United States, courts have established that parallel importation is legal. In the case of Kirtsaeng v. John Wiley & Sons, Inc., the US Supreme Court held that the first-sale doctrine applies to copies of a copyrighted work lawfully made abroad, thus permitting importation and resale of many product categories.

Moreover, the Science, State, Justice, and Commerce, and Related Agencies, Appropriations Act of 2006 prohibits future free trade agreements from categorically disallowing the parallel import of patented products.

=== Taiwan ===
Article 36(2) of the Trademark Act of Taiwan provides that "where goods have been put on the domestic or foreign market under a registered trademark by the proprietor or with his/her consent, the proprietor is not entitled to claim trademark rights on such goods, unless such claim is to prevent the condition of the goods been changed, impaired, reprocessed or reformed by a third party after such goods have been put on the market or there exist other legitimate reasons."

== Automobiles ==
=== United States ===
The United States has unique automobile design legislation administered by the National Highway Traffic Safety Administration. Certain car makers find the required modifications too expensive. In the past, this created demand for grey import vehicles, where certain models are modified for individual customers to meet these requirements at a higher cost than if it had been done by the original manufacturer. This procedure interferes with the marketing scheme of the manufacturer, who might plan to import a less powerful car and force consumers to accept it. The Imported Vehicle Safety Compliance Act of 1988 basically ended the gray market by requiring manufacturer certification of U.S.-bound cars.

=== China ===
In 2016, the Ministry of Commerce and seven other departments of China issued the Several Opinions on Promoting the Pilot Program of Parallel Automobile Imports; in 2019, the Ministry of Commerce and six other departments subsequently issued the Opinions on Further Promoting the Development of Parallel Automobile Imports.

== Parallel-imported foodstuffs, etc. ==
Markets for parallel imports and locally made products sometimes exist alongside each other even though the parallel imports are markedly more expensive. This may be for various reasons, but is mostly observed in foodstuffs and toiletry.

Due to the nature of hotels, travellers often have little information on where to shop except in the immediate vicinity. Grocery shops opened to serve brand-name hotels often feature parallel-imported foodstuffs and toiletry to cater to travellers so that they can easily recognise the product they have been using at home.

Foodstuffs and toiletry made from different plants may vary in quality because different plants may use materials or reagents (such as water used for washing, food additives) from different sources.

== Issues ==
A manifestation of the philosophical divide between those who support various intellectual property and those who are critical of it, is the divide over the legitimacy of parallel importation. Some believe that it benefits consumers by lowering prices and widening the selection and consumption of products available in the market, while others believe that it discourages intellectual property owners from investing in new and innovative products. Some also believe that parallel imports tend to facilitate copyright infringement.

This tension essentially concerns the rights and duties of a protected monopoly. Intellectual property rights allow the holder to sell at a price that is higher than the price one would pay in a competitive market, but by doing so the holder relinquishes sales to those who would be prepared to buy at a price between the monopoly price and the competitive price. The presence of parallel imports in the marketplace prevents the holder from exploiting the monopoly further by market segmentation, i.e. by applying different prices to different consumers.

Consumer organizations tend to support parallel importation as it offers consumers more choice and lower prices, provided that consumers retain equivalent legal protection to locally sourced products (e.g. in the form of warranties with international effect), and competition is not diminished.

However, such organisations also warn consumers of certain risks in using parallel-imported products. Although the products may have been made to comply with the laws and customs of their place of origin, these products or their use may not comply with those in places where they are used, or some of their functions may be rendered unusable or meaningless (which may needlessly drive up prices). Electronic devices, however, suffer less from this type of risk because newer models support more than one user language.

== Examples ==
=== Australia ===
Importation of computer games and computer game hardware from Asia is a common practice for some wholesale and/or retail stockists. Many consumers now take advantage of on-line stores in Hong Kong and the United States to purchase computer games at or near half the cost of a retail purchase from the Australian RRP. Often the versions sold by the Asian retailers are manufactured in Australia to begin with. An example is Crysis, which was available from Hong Kong on-line stores for approximately A$50, but whose retail cost in Australia was close to $100. Crysis was sold in Asia using identical versions of the game box and disc, right down to including Australian censor ratings on the box.

=== Hong Kong ===
Importation of Colgate toothpaste from Thailand into Hong Kong. The goods are bought in markets where the price is lower, and sold in markets where the price of the same goods is, for a variety of reasons, higher. Electronic goods like Apple's iPad are frequently imported in Hong Kong before they're official and resold to South-East Asian early adopters for a premium.

=== New Zealand ===
The practice exists of luxury car dealers in New Zealand buying Mercedes-Benz vehicles in Malaysia at a low price, and importing the cars into New Zealand to sell at a price lower than the price offered by Mercedes Benz to New Zealand consumers. There are also many parallel import dealers of electronics hardware. Parallel importing is allowed in New Zealand and has resulted in a significant lowering of margins on many products.

=== Poland ===
There is an opinion, not scientifically proven, but very popular among people in Poland that "Western" washing powders are more effective in cleaning than Polish, because chemistry companies allegedly produce items of higher quality for Western Europe. Because of that, there are companies and online stores importing Western chemistry supplies to Poland (for example from Germany), even if similar brands are available there.

=== Russia ===
According to Anatoliy Semyonov, trademark rights exhaustion turned national in 2002, and, as of April 2013, an act is being prepared that could make original goods imported without a permission of the producer officially "counterfeit" (by replacing things on which "a trademark is located illegally" with things "on which an illegally used trademark is located"). He notes that, according to the Criminal Code, illegal use of a trademark can be punished up to 6 years of imprisonment; and a similar article in the Offences Code makes goods with an illegal copy of a trademark subject to confiscation.

In 2022, following the exit of various Western firms from Russia as a result of the Russian invasion of Ukraine, a parallel import scheme was legalized to allow certain goods into Russia. In September, the trade minister, Denis Manturov, stated that Russian consumers would be able to buy the newly announced iPhone 14, despite Apple halting all sales in the country. Apple products were already being re-exported and sold in Russia through the scheme, although at a higher price.

=== European Union ===
Some Sony PSP video game consoles were imported into the European Economic Area from Japan up to twelve months prior to the European launch. The unusual component of this example is that some importers were selling the console for a higher price than the intended EU price, taking advantage of the relative monopoly they enjoyed. After the release the console was commonly imported from the USA where it was retailed for much lower price.

Other example is smart phones, which were being imported from China, where an average device could be bought for about $100 while a similar device would be retailed for about €200 in the EU.

=== United States ===
A foreign manufacturer and vendor of face powder sold to A. Bourjois & Co., Inc. its business and goodwill in the US, together with its trademarks, registered under the Trade Mark Act; A. Bourjois & Co., Inc. re-registered the marks and went on with the business here under the old name, buying the powder from the original concern abroad and selling it in boxes bearing the trademark, and so built up a profitable trade, the public associating the marks with A. Bourjois & Co., Inc.'s goods. Katzel bought and imported the product of the foreign concern in its genuine boxes, which bore labels closely resembling those of A. Bourjois & Co., Inc. and sold it here.

=== China ===
Chinese government encourages parallel imports of vehicles.

== See also ==
- Counterfeit consumer goods
- Exhaustion of intellectual property rights – Doctrine in intellectual property law
- Grey market – Commodity trade outside of original producer's distribution channel
- Grey import vehicle – Vehicle imported through third-party channels
- Import scene – Car subculture
- Importation right – Right to import a product to a given country
- Parallel importing in video games – Type of digital rights management
- Track and trace

== Bibliography ==
- The Gray Blog is a blog dedicated to parallel market legal issues.
- Australian Library and Information Association - Statement on Parallel Importing
- Statement on parallel import and export, or parallel trade..
- Australian Productivity Commission 2009: "Restrictions on the Parallel Importation of Books" - The Australian Productivity Commission report, released 14 July 2009, presented original research to advocate the removal of parallel import restrictions on books.
