= Sidney Alexander =

Sidney Alexander may refer to:

- Sidney S. Alexander (1916–2005), American economist
- Sidney A. Alexander (1866–1948), English poet, author, and clergyman
