= Absorption =

Absorption may refer to:

== Chemistry and biology ==
- Absorption (biology), digestion
  - Absorption (small intestine)
- Absorption (chemistry), diffusion of particles of gas or liquid into liquid or solid materials
- Absorption (skin), a route by which substances enter the body through the skin
- Absorption (pharmacology), absorption of drugs into the body

== Physics and chemical engineering ==
- Absorption (acoustics), absorption of sound waves by a material
- Absorption (electromagnetic radiation), absorption of light or other electromagnetic radiation by a material
- Absorption air conditioning, a type of solar air conditioning
- Absorption refrigerator, a refrigerator that runs on surplus heat rather than electricity
- Dielectric absorption, the inability of a charged capacitor to completely discharge when briefly discharged

== Mathematics and economics ==
- Absorption (economics), the total demand of an economy for goods and services both from within and without
- Absorption (logic), one of the rules of inference
- Absorption costing, or total absorption costing, a method for appraising or valuing a firm's total inventory by including all the manufacturing costs incurred to produce those goods
- Absorbing element, in mathematics, an element that does not change when it is combined in a binary operation with some other element
- Absorption law, in mathematics, an identity linking a pair of binary operations

== See also ==
- Adsorption, the formation of a gas or liquid film on a solid surface
- CO_{2} scrubber, device which absorbs carbon dioxide from circulated gas
- Digestion, the uptake of substances by the gastrointestinal tract
- Absorption (psychology), a state of becoming absorbed by mental imagery or fantasy
- Flow (psychology), a state of total mental "absorption"
