= Lexmark International, Inc. v. Static Control Components, Inc. =

- Supreme Court of the United States

Argued December 3, 2013 Decided March 25, 2014
- Full case name: Lexmark International, Inc. v. Static Control Components, Inc.
- Docket no.: 12-873
- Citations: 572 U.S. 118 (more) 134 S. Ct. 1377; 188 L. Ed. 2d 392
- Argument: Oral argument

Case history
- Prior: 697 F.3d 387 (6th Cir. 2012); cert. granted, 569 U.S. 1017 (2013).

Holding
- Static Control's alleged injuries—lost sales and damage to its business reputation—fall within the zone of interests protected by the Lanham Act, and Static Control sufficiently alleged that its injuries were proximately caused by Lexmark's misrepresentations.

Court membership
- Chief Justice John Roberts Associate Justices Antonin Scalia · Anthony Kennedy; Clarence Thomas · Ruth Bader Ginsburg; Stephen Breyer · Samuel Alito; Sonia Sotomayor · Elena Kagan

Case opinion
- Majority: Scalia, joined by unanimous

Laws applied
- 15 U.S.C. § 1125(a)

Lexmark International, Inc. v. Static Control Components, Inc., is an American legal case involving the computer printer company Lexmark, which had designed an authentication system using a microcontroller so that only authorized toner cartridges could be used. The resulting litigation (described by Justice Scalia in 2014 as "sprawling", and by others as having the potential to go on as long as Jarndyce v. Jarndyce) has resulted in significant decisions affecting United States intellectual property and trademark law.

In separate rulings in 2004 and 2012, the United States Court of Appeals for the Sixth Circuit ruled that:

- circumvention of Lexmark's ink cartridge authentication does not violate the Digital Millennium Copyright Act (DMCA), and
- Static Control Components had standing basis under the Lanham Act to sue Lexmark for false advertising in relation to its promotion of the program, which was unanimously affirmed in 2014 by the Supreme Court of the United States.

The Supreme Court's 2014 ruling also affects statutory interpretation in the area of standing in pursuing lawsuits on statutory grounds in a wide variety of areas in federal court.

== Background ==
Lexmark is a large manufacturer of laser and inkjet printers, and Static Control Components (SCC) is a company that makes "a wide range of technology products, including microchips that it sells to third-party companies for use in remanufactured toner cartridges."

In an effort to control and reduce the refilling and redistribution of toner cartridges, Lexmark began distributing two distinct varieties of its toner cartridges. Under its Prebate Program (now known as the Lexmark Return Program), through a shrinkwrap license, Lexmark sold certain printer cartridges at a discount (as much as $50 less) to customers who agreed to "use the cartridge only once and return it only to Lexmark for remanufacturing or recycling". Lexmark's "Non-Prebate" cartridges could be refilled by the user without restrictions and were sold without any discount.

Lexmark touted the Prebate Program as a benefit to the environment and to their customers, since it would allow customers to get cheaper cartridges, and the benefit to Lexmark was that it could keep empty cartridges out of the hands of competing rechargers. Many users purchased such cartridges under the stated conditions.

To enforce this agreement, Lexmark cartridges included a computer chip that included a 55-byte computer program (the "Toner Loading Program") which communicated with a "Printer Engine Program" built into the printer. The program calculated the amount of toner used during printing: when the calculations indicated that the original supply of Lexmark toner should be exhausted, the printer would stop functioning, even if the cartridge had been refilled. In addition, if the chip did not perform an encrypted authentication sequence, or if the Toner Loading Program on the chip did not have a checksum matching exactly a value stored elsewhere on the chip, the printer would not use the cartridge.

In 2002, SCC developed its own computer chip that would duplicate the "handshake" used by the Lexmark chip, and that also included a verbatim copy of the Toner Loading Program, which SCC claimed was necessary to allow the printer to function. A Prebate cartridge could successfully be refilled if Lexmark's chip on the cartridge was replaced with the SCC chip. SCC began selling its "Smartek" chips to toner cartridge rechargers.

== Copyright and DMCA claims: 2004 Circuit Court ruling ==
Lexmark Int'l v. Static Control Components
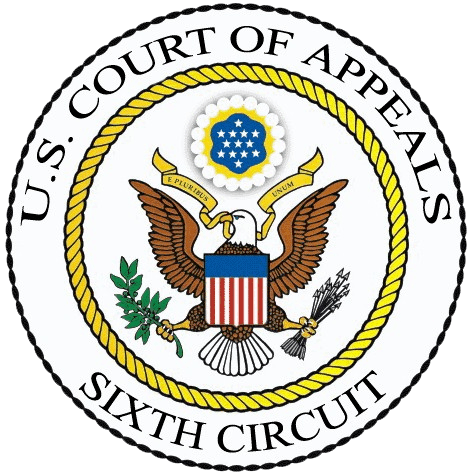
- Court: United States Court of Appeals for the Sixth Circuit
- Full case name: Lexmark International, Inc. v. Static Control Components, Inc.
- Decided: October 26, 2004
- Citation: 387 F.3d 522

Case history
- Prior action: 253 F. Supp. 2d 943 (E.D.Ky. 2003) (granting summary judgment for plaintiff)
- Subsequent actions: rehearing denied, Dec. 29, 2004; and rehearing en banc denied, Feb. 15, 2005; case remanded to district court for further proceedings consistent with the opinion.

Court membership
- Judges sitting: Gilbert Stroud Merritt, Jr., Jeffrey S. Sutton, and John Feikens (sitting by designation)

Case opinions
- District court erroneously granted summary judgment for plaintiff on claim under Digital Millennium Copyright Act based on defendant's manufacture of computer chips that enabled third party manufacturers to produce toner cartridges that were compatible with laser printers manufactured by plaintiff

=== At the district court ===
On December 30, 2002, Lexmark sued SCC in the United States District Court for the Eastern District of Kentucky. The suit claimed that SCC had:

- violated copyright law by copying the Toner Loading Program, and
- violated the DMCA by selling products that circumvented the encrypted authentication sequence between the Lexmark cartridge chip and the printer.

On March 3, 2003, Judge Karl S. Forester granted a preliminary injunction to Lexmark, blocking SCC from distributing its cartridge chips. The ruling was seen to be controversial.

On the copyright claim, the court found that:

- the use of the Toner Loading Program was indeed a likely copyright violation, because the Toner Loading Program was not a "lock-out code" that SCC was entitled to copy under the DMCA, and because the Toner Loading Program could be rewritten in different ways (and therefore had enough creativity to qualify for copyright protection).
- the Copyright Office's decision to grant copyright registration to the two programs showed that the programs were probably copyrightable.
- because of the complexity of the authentication system, SCC could not have known that it could bypass the authentication without using Lexmark's copyrighted program; but it held that this did not matter because "Innocent infringement, however, is still infringement."
- fair use did not apply.

On the DMCA claims, the court found that the SCC microchip circumvented Lexmark's authentication sequence, and that the reverse engineering exception to the DMCA did not apply, because it only covers the independent creation of new programs that must interoperate with existing ones, and SCC did not create any new program.

=== Appellate ruling ===
SCC appealed the district court's ruling to the Sixth Circuit Court of Appeals. As is usual for federal appeals in the United States, a three judge panel heard the appeal – for this matter, the panel consisted of appellate judges Gilbert S. Merritt and Jeffrey S. Sutton, and John Feikens (a district court judge temporarily assisting the appeals court). On October 26, 2004, the judges issued their ruling, in which all three judges wrote separate opinions.

==== Majority opinion ====
In the majority opinion, Judge Sutton (with Judge Merritt agreeing) reversed the lower court's ruling and vacated the temporary injunction, holding that Lexmark was unlikely to succeed in its case. The case was remanded to the district court for further proceedings consistent with the opinion.

On the copyright claim, the court noted that unlike patents, copyright protection cannot be applied to ideas, but only to particular, creative expressions of ideas. Distinguishing between an unprotectable idea and a protectable creative expression is difficult in the context of computer programs; even though it may be possible to express the same idea in many different programs, "practical realities"—hardware and software constraints, design standards, industry practices, etc.—may make different expressions impractical. "Lock-out" codes—codes that must be performed in a certain way in order to bypass a security system—are generally considered functional rather than creative, and thus unprotectable.

With these principles in mind, it was held that the district court had erred in three ways:

1. It had held that the Toner Loading Program was copyrightable simply because it "could be written in a number of different ways", without considering the practical realities.
2. Because of this mistaken standard, it had refused to consider whether or not the alternative Toner Loading Programs proposed by Lexmark were practical.
3. It had concluded that the Toner Loading Program was not a "lock-out code", because it had not sufficiently considered how difficult it would be for SCC—without Lexmark's knowledge of the code's structure and purpose—to alter the code and still pass the printer's authentication mechanisms.

On the DMCA claims, the majority first considered Lexmark's claim that the SCC chip circumvented the access controls on the Printer Engine Program. It held that Lexmark's authentication sequence did not "control access" to the program; rather, the purchase of the printer itself allowed access to the program:

Anyone who buys a Lexmark printer may read the literal code of the Printer Engine Program directly from the printer memory, with or without the benefit of the authentication sequence[...]No security device, in other words, protects access to the Printer Engine Program[...]

Likewise, the majority opinion held that anyone purchasing a printer and toner cartridge could read the Toner Loading Program from the printer; so SCC did not circumvent an access control on the Toner Loading Program either.

The court also rejected the district court's conclusion that the interoperability defense did not apply. Since SCC had offered testimony that its chips did indeed contain independently created programs in addition to Lexmark's Toner Loading Program, the Toner Loading Program could be seen as necessary to allow interoperation between SCC's own programs and the Lexmark printer.

==== Concurring opinion ====
In a concurring opinion, Judge Merritt agreed with Judge Sutton on the outcome of this particular case, but also indicated that he would go farther:

I write separately to emphasize that our holding should not be limited to the narrow facts surrounding either the Toner Loading Program or the Printer Engine Program. We should make clear that in the future companies like Lexmark cannot use the DMCA in conjunction with copyright law to create monopolies of manufacturer goods for themselves[...]

He opined that even if the programs involved were more complex (and thus more deserving of copyright protection), the key question would be the purpose of the circumvention technology. Under his proposed framework, if a third-party manufacturer's use of a circumvention technology was intended only to allow its products to interoperate with another manufacturer's—and not to gain any independent benefit from the functionality of the code being copied—then that circumvention would be permissible.

==== Concurring/dissenting opinion ====
Judge Feikens also wrote an opinion, agreeing with many of the majority opinion's results (though sometimes for different reasons), but disagreeing with its conclusion on the Toner Loading Program.

Concerning the copyrightability of the Toner Loading Program, he found that the record supported Lexmark's claim that the program could have been implemented in any number of ways, and therefore Lexmark's implementation was creative and copyrightable. Agreeing that the record was inadequate for the district court to conclude that the Toner Loading Program was a "lock-out code", he noted that Lexmark's expert had testified that the entire Toner Loading Program process could be turned off by flipping a single bit in the chip's code, and that it should have been possible for SCC to discover this; so copying the program may not have been practically necessary too.

On the DMCA counts, Feikens agreed that Lexmark had not established a violation with regards to the Toner Loading Program, but for a very different reason than that found by the majority opinion. He noted that SCC had testified that it had not even been aware that the Toner Loading Program existed; it had copied the data on the Lexmark printer chip (including the Toner Loading Program) purely in an attempt to bypass the protection on the Printer Engine Program. Since the DMCA requires that an infringer knowingly circumvent access controls on the protected program, SCC could not have knowingly circumvented protections on a program it did not know existed. With regards to the Printer Engine Program, he agreed with the majority opinion, but also noted in his belief that the consumer had acquired the rights to access this program by purchasing the printer, and therefore the DMCA would not apply to attempts to access it.

=== Request for a rehearing ===
Lexmark filed a request for the full Sixth Circuit to hear the case en banc. The Sixth Circuit rejected this request in February 2005.

Rule 13 of the United States Supreme Court Rules of Procedure requires the losing party in a case before a court of appeals to file a petition for a writ of certiorari within 90 days from the date the court of appeals enters its judgment, or from the date of the denial of a petition for rehearing in the court of appeals. The Sixth Circuit's judgment became final for all purposes when the 90-day period expired without Lexmark filing a cert petition.

=== Impact ===
The Sixth Circuit's decision is noteworthy for at least two reasons:

1. All three judges took pains to emphasize in their opinions that the DMCA must be interpreted consistently with the broader public purposes of the copyright statute, rather than as a grant of new powers to makers of technology products to impose additional restrictions not contemplated by copyright.
2. It represents a rare defeat for large printer manufacturers like Lexmark, Hewlett-Packard and Epson in their ongoing battle with third-party ink sellers.

Lexmark 2004 is also consistent with subsequent jurisprudence in the United States Court of Appeals for the Federal Circuit in The Chamberlain Group, Inc. v. Skylink Technologies, Inc., and therefore emphasizes that the DMCA was intended to create a new type of liability — not a property right — over durable goods incorporating copyrighted material.

== Trademark and false advertising: 2012 Circuit Court ruling ==
Static Control Components v. Lexmark Intern., Inc.
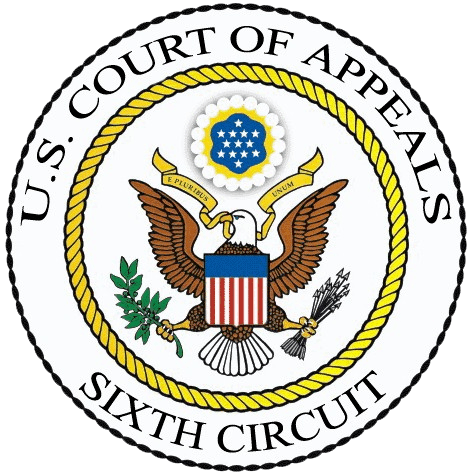
- Court: United States Court of Appeals for the Sixth Circuit
- Full case name: Static Control Components, Inc. v. Lexmark International, Inc.
- Decided: August 29, 2012
- Citation: 697 F.3d 387

Case history
- Prior action: 2006 U.S. Dist. LEXIS 73845 (E.D. Ky. Sept. 28, 2006)
- Appealed to: United States Supreme Court
- Subsequent actions: Rehearing denied en banc, 2012 U.S. App. LEXIS 23975 (6th Cir. Oct. 26, 2012)

Court membership
- Judges sitting: Damon Keith, Danny Julian Boggs, and Karen Nelson Moore

Case opinions
- Static Control Components lacked standing to pursue a federal antitrust claim under the Clayton Act or the Sherman Act, but could pursue a false association claim under the Lanham Act, as different tests for standing applied.
- Decision by: Karen Nelson Moore

=== District Court ===
Before the Sixth Circuit's ruling, Static Control initiated a separate action in 2004 seeking declaratory judgment under federal copyright laws and the DMCA that its newly modified chips did not infringe Lexmark's copyrights, and Lexmark counterclaimed raising patent infringement, DMCA violations, and tort claims, and added three remanufacturers as third-party defendants.

On remand, Lexmark successfully moved to dismiss all of Static Control's counterclaims. During the course of the proceedings, the court ruled that:

- nine of Lexmark's mechanical patents were valid, but two of its design patents were invalid,
- summary judgment would be granted to Lexmark on its claims of direct patent infringement against three co-defendants, and
- Lexmark's single-use license for Prebate cartridges was valid, which prevented Lexmark's patents from exhausting following the initial sale of the Prebate toner cartridges to end users. However, this was subsequently modified by the judge later, after the United States Supreme Court's decision in Quanta Computer, Inc. v. LG Electronics, Inc.

Therefore, the trial's issues consisted only of Lexmark's claim of induced patent infringement against Static Control and Static Control's defense of patent misuse. The district judge Gregory Frederick Van Tatenhove instructed the jury that its findings on patent misuse would be advisory; the jury held that Static Control did not induce patent infringement and advised that Lexmark misused its patents. Lexmark renewed its earlier request for a judgment as a matter of law and also filed a motion for a retrial on its patent inducement claim, both of which the district court denied. Both parties timely appealed.

=== The appellate ruling ===
In a unanimous ruling, the district court's findings were affirmed, except for its dismissal of Static Control's counterclaims under the Lanham Act and North Carolina state law. These were reversed and remanded for further consideration.

In particular, it was held:

- the 6th Circuit had jurisdiction to hear the appeal under 28 U.S.C. § 1291 (as opposed to being referred to the United States Court of Appeals for the Federal Circuit under 28 U.S.C. § 1295),
- the district court did not abuse its discretion in increasing the amount of the injunction bond entered during the preliminary injunction hearing,
- SCC's federal antitrust counterclaims under §§ 4 and 16 of the Clayton Act for violations of §§ 1 and 2 of the Sherman Act failed for lack of standing, under the standard set in Associated Gen. Contractors of Cal., Inc. v. Cal. State Council of Carpenters ("AGC"),
- SCC's counterclaim for false advertising under the Lanham Act is valid, as the 6th Circuit applies a "reasonable interest" standard to determine standing (in common with the 2nd Circuit, as opposed to the categorical test used in the Seventh, Ninth and Tenth Circuits, or the AGC approach used in the Third, Fifth, Eighth and Eleventh Circuits),
- SCC's counterclaim for unfair competition and false advertising under North Carolina's Unfair Deceptive Trade Practices Act is valid under state law, as determined by the North Carolina Court of Appeals

=== Impact ===
The ruling also let stand the district court's ruling of the impact of Quanta Computer, Inc. v. LG Electronics, Inc. on the exhaustion doctrine in the area of patent law. By finding that the sale of patented goods, even when subject to valid license restrictions, exhausts patent rights, it essentially gives Quanta a broad interpretation, which threatens to render unenforceable through patent law differential licensing schemes that attempt to distinguish separate fields of use for a patented item. However, the United States Court of Appeals for the Federal Circuit's ruling in Lexmark Int'l, Inc. v. Impression Prods., Inc. reopened the issue. The Court held that after the sale of a patented item, the patent holder cannot sue for patent infringement relating to further use of that item, even when in violation of a contract with a customer or imported from outside the United States.

== Scope of federal statutory torts: 2014 ruling at the Supreme Court ==
Lexmark International, Inc. v. Static Control Components, Inc.
- Supreme Court of the United States

Argued December 3, 2013 Decided March 25, 2014
- Full case name: Lexmark International, Inc. v. Static Control Components, Inc.
- Docket no.: 12-873
- Citations: 572 U.S. 118 (more) 134 S. Ct. 1377; 188 L. Ed. 2d 392
- Argument: Oral argument

Case history
- Prior: 697 F.3d 387 (6th Cir. 2012); cert. granted, 569 U.S. 1017 (2013).

Holding
- Judgment AFFIRMED. Static Control's alleged injuries—lost sales and damage to its business reputation—fall within the zone of interests protected by the Lanham Act, and Static Control sufficiently alleged that its injuries were proximately caused by Lexmark's misrepresentations.

Court membership
- Chief Justice John Roberts Associate Justices Antonin Scalia · Anthony Kennedy; Clarence Thomas · Ruth Bader Ginsburg; Stephen Breyer · Samuel Alito; Sonia Sotomayor · Elena Kagan

Case opinion
- Majority: Scalia, joined by unanimous

Laws applied
- 15 U.S.C. § 1125(a)

=== Appeal of the 2012 ruling ===
The Circuit Court's ruling with respect to standing under the Lanham Act was appealed by Lexmark to the Supreme Court of the United States, on which certiorari was granted on June 3, 2013. The case was heard on December 3, 2013, and the question presented to the Court was:

Whether the appropriate analytic framework for determining a party's standing to maintain an action for false advertising under the Lanham Act is:

1. the factors set forth in Associated Gen. Contractors of Cal., Inc. v. Cal. State Council of Carpenters, as adopted by the Third, Fifth, Eighth, and Eleventh Circuits;
2. the categorical test, permitting suits only by an actual competitor, employed by the Seventh, Ninth, and Tenth Circuits; or
3. a version of the more expansive "reasonable interest" test, either as applied by the Sixth Circuit in this case or as applied by the Second Circuit in prior cases.

Lexmark argued in favour of the AGC test, while SCC argued that the appropriate test should actually be that of the "zone of interests" protected by the statute that has been applied in cases involving the Administrative Procedure Act, the Endangered Species Act, and Title VII of the Civil Rights Act. At the hearing, it appeared that Lexmark's submission received more intensive examination than SCC's.

=== Decision ===
On March 25, 2014, the US Supreme Court unanimously affirmed the Sixth Circuit's holding that Static Control did have standing to sue under the Lanham Act.

The Court developed a new test for assessing standing in false advertising, rejecting the existing tests, including the Sixth Circuit's "reasonable interest test". In that regard, the approach adopted by Scalia J. consists of several steps:

1. Under Article III, the plaintiff must have suffered or be imminently threatened with a concrete and particularized "injury in fact" that is fairly traceable to the challenged action of the defendant and likely to be redressed by a favorable judicial decision.
2. AGC requires the ascertainment, as a matter of statutory interpretation, of the "scope of the private remedy created by" Congress, and the "class of persons who [could] maintain a private damages action under" a legislatively conferred cause of action.
3. A statutory cause of action extends only to plaintiffs whose interests "fall within the zone of interests protected by the law invoked," and the "zone of interests" formulation applies to all statutorily created causes of action, as it is a "requirement of general application" and Congress is presumed to "legislat[e] against the background of" it, "which applies unless it is expressly negated."
4. A statutory cause of action is also presumed to be limited to plaintiffs whose injuries are proximately caused by violations of the statute. A plaintiff suing under §1125(a) ordinarily must show that its economic or reputational injury flows directly from the deception wrought by the defendant's advertising; and that occurs when deception of consumers causes them to withhold trade from the plaintiff.
5. Direct application of the zone-of-interests test and the proximate-cause requirement supplies the relevant limits on who may sue under §1125(a).

In discussing the scope of proximate cause, Scalia noted:

The District Court emphasized that Lexmark and Static Control are not direct competitors. But when a party claims reputational injury from disparagement, competition is not required for proximate cause; and that is true even if the defendant's aim was to harm its immediate competitors, and the plaintiff merely suffered collateral damage. Consider two rival carmakers who purchase airbags for their cars from different third-party manufacturers. If the first carmaker, hoping to divert sales from the second, falsely proclaims that the airbags used by the second carmaker are defective, both the second carmaker and its airbag supplier may suffer reputational injury, and their sales may decline as a result. In those circumstances, there is no reason to regard either party's injury as derivative of the other's; each is directly and independently harmed by the attack on its merchandise.

The previous tests adopted by the various Circuit Courts were dismissed as being problematical on several grounds:

Test	Circuits in which adopted	Advocated by	Deficiency
Multifactor balancing test ("AGC")	3rd, 5th, 8th and 11th	Lexmark	Experience has shown that open-ended balancing tests can yield unpredictable and at times arbitrary results.
Direct-competitor test	7th, 9th and 10th	Lexmark, in the alternative	Provides a bright-line rule; but it does so at the expense of distorting the statutory language.
Reasonable interests test	2nd and 6th	Several amici	A purely practical objection to the test is that it lends itself to widely divergent application. The relevant question is not whether the plaintiff's interest is "reasonable," but whether it is one the Lanham Act protects; and not whether there is a "reasonable basis" for the plaintiff's claim of harm, but whether the harm alleged is proximately tied to the defendant's conduct.

=== Impact ===
The Court's ruling was described as being "a tour de force treatment of statutory standing," and being "certain to earn reprinting in casebooks and citations in briefs for decades to come." It was seen to have greater scope than what was directly related to the case at hand:

- it was noted as being unusual for the current Court to open the door to more lawsuits
- the Court has rejected a notable body of existing doctrine relating to standing
- the Court also took the unusual step of rejecting all Circuit Court interpretations on the question through substituting its own take on the matter
- the new standard does not define standing requirements as narrowly as some circuits did, but by adding the proximate causation test, it may ultimately make it more difficult for plaintiffs to show standing
- the Court's focus on statutory purposes and their implication for what a statute authorizes, rather than so-called "prudential" considerations, may limit standing and shift the debate over who can sue under a wide variety of federal laws

== See also ==
- Impression Prods., Inc. v. Lexmark Int'l, Inc.: similar ink cartridge case
- Chamberlain v. Skylink, another copyright case posing similar DMCA questions
- Sega v. Accolade, a copyright case involving interoperability issues with unlicensed Sega Genesis games.
