= Chamberlain Group, Inc. v. Skylink Technologies, Inc. =

American legal case concerning the DMCA

The Chamberlain Group, Inc. v. Skylink Technologies, Inc.
- Court: United States Court of Appeals for the Federal Circuit
- Decided: Aug. 31, 2004
- Citation: 381 F.3d 1178

Court membership
- Judges sitting: Arthur J. Gajarsa, Richard Linn, Sharon Prost

Case opinions
- Maker of replacement garage door openers (GDOs) did not violate the anti-trafficking provisions of the Digital Millennium Copyright Act (DMCA), because owners of GDOs were authorized to access Plaintiff's GDO software and Plaintiff failed to allege or show a nexus between access and copyright infringement. Plaintiff had the burden to prove that Skylink's Model 39 garage door openers violated the DMCA and failed to do so. Summary judgment upheld in favor of Skylink.

Keywords
- Digital Millennium Copyright Act, Anti-circumvention

The Chamberlain Group, Inc. v. Skylink Technologies, Inc., 381 F.3d 1178 (Fed. Cir. 2004) is a legal case heard by the United States Court of Appeals for the Federal Circuit concerning the anti-trafficking provision of the Digital Millennium Copyright Act (DMCA), 17 U.S.C. § 1201(a)(2), in the context of two competing universal garage door opener companies. It discusses the statutory structure and legislative history of the DMCA to help clarify the intent of the anti-circumvention provisions and decide who holds the burden of proof. It expresses that the statute creates a cause of action for liability and does not create a property right, and holds that as Chamberlain had alleged that Skylink was in violation of the anti-trafficking provision, it had the burden to prove and failed to show that access was unauthorized and its rights were infringed under the Copyright Act. As Chamberlain incorrectly argued that Skylink had the burden of proof and failed to prove their claim, the court upheld summary judgment in favor of Skylink.

== Background of the case ==
This case involves two competitors that produce universal garage door openers (GDOs). Universal garage door openers are used when people want to replace or purchase a spare transmitter to open their garage door. They are designed to interoperate with existing GDO systems, regardless of model.

Chamberlain markets a "Security+" line of GDOs which includes rolling code software that actively alters the transmitted signal by cycling through a series of strings (of which only some are able to open the door). This rolling code is designed to protect against a potential "code grabbing" attack where a nearby burglar may try to record the garage door opening signal. Chamberlain claims that the rolling code system makes it unlikely for a burglar to send a valid signal by replaying the recorded one. With rolling code protection, a garage door will open if and only if the transmitted code is not among the last 1024 used codes and it is among the next 4096 codes. The Security+ has additional functionality that will cause the GDO to resynchronize when two signals out of the acceptable range are transmitted in rapid succession. This was added in the case that homeowners use the same transmitter on multiple garage doors.

In 1992, Skylink produced a universal transmitter called Model 39 that was designed to work for both rolling code and non-rolling code GDOs. The Model 39 bypasses the Chamberlain's rolling code system by imitating Security+'s resynchronization feature. The Model 39 transmitter sends three fixed codes in rapid succession; this either causes the door to open due to the first code or it causes the door to resynchronize and open due to the latter two codes.

== Relevant law ==
This case involves the anti-trafficking provisions of the DMCA. 17 U.S.C. § 1201(b) states:

No person shall manufacture, import, offer to the public, provide, or otherwise traffic in any technology, product, service, device, component, or part thereof, that— (A) is primarily designed or produced for the purpose of circumventing a technological measure that effectively controls access to a work protected under this title;

== Procedural history ==
Chamberlain sued Skylink in the United States District Court for the Northern District of Illinois in two cases. In the first case, Chamberlain I, Chamberlain alleged that Skylink's actions violated the anti-trafficking provisions of the DMCA and moved for summary judgment. The court denied Chamberlain's motion for summary judgment. In the second case, Chamberlain II, Chamberlain alleged that Skylink infringed their patents and violated the anti-trafficking provisions of the DMCA.

With regards to the DMCA claim in Chamberlain II, Chamberlain contended that:

1. Model 39 was designed to circumvent the protection mechanism placed by Chamberlain's rolling code (infringing §1201(a)(2)(A)).
2. It has limited commercial use other than to circumvent the rolling code (infringing §1201(a)(2)(B)).
3. It was marketed to circumvent that technology (infringing §1201(a)(2)(C)).

In response, Skylink claimed that "consumers use the Model 39 transmitter to activate the Security+ GDOs with Chamberlain's consent." §1201(a)(3)(A) states that to "circumvent a technological measure" means to "descramble a scrambled work, to decrypt an encrypted work, or otherwise to avoid, bypass, remove, deactivate, or impair a technological measure, without the authority of the copyright owner." They also claimed that the Model 39 transmitter served a variety of functions that were unrelated to circumvention, that Chamberlain had failed to demonstrate that its GDOs contained a computer program protected by copyright, that Skylink had not violated the DMCA because its acts fell within a safe harbor provision per §1201(f), and that Chamberlain's rolling code computer program did not protect a copyrighted computer program, but instead protects an uncopyrightable process.

Chamberlain claimed that (1) Skylink had the burden to prove that their use was authorized and (2) Chamberlain "never gave consumers explicit authorization to program competing universal transmitters into its rolling code openers."

The District Court agreed with Skylink and because Chamberlain did not explicitly restrict the consumer's use of alternate transmitters, this was deemed an unconditional sale that implicitly authorized customers to use other transmitters. The court also noted that Chamberlain's construction and interpretation of the DMCA would make its own consumers violate §1201(a)(1), which prohibits circumvention of a technological measure that controls access.

As Chamberlain did not show that Skylink's access was unauthorized, the District Court granted the motion for summary judgment to Skylink and dismissed the patent claims.

== Appeal issues ==
Chamberlain appealed the District Court's decision of summary judgment granted to Skylink in Chamberlain II and the case was heard before the United States Court of Appeals for the Federal Circuit. In this case, Chamberlain claimed the District Court incorrectly placed the burden on Chamberlain to prove that the circumvention of its technological measures was unauthorized when it should have placed the burden on Skylink to show that the use was authorized.

== Decision ==
The Federal Circuit affirmed the District Court's ruling. The court explained that by explicitly stating that circumvention occurs "without the authority of the copyright owner," the DMCA requires the plaintiff alleging circumvention to show that the defendant's access was unauthorized.

The Federal Circuit went on to clarify the nature of the DMCA's anti-circumvention provisions. The DMCA established causes of action for liability and did not establish a property right. Therefore, circumvention is not infringement in itself.

In response to Chamberlain's assertions that the DMCA "renders the pre-DMCA history in the GDO industry irrelevant," "fundamentally altered the legal landscape," and "overrode all pre-existing consumer expectations about the legitimate uses of products containing copyrighted embedded software," the court disagreed. In Chamberlain's view, all use of products that contain copyrighted software and use protective technological measures would violate the DMCA and this would give companies a loophole around antitrust laws as well as take away the fair use defense. By examining the structure and history of the statute and the intent of Congress, the court attempted to interpret the statutory language. The court found that the goals of the DMCA were to establish a balance between the competing interests of content owners and information users and balance access control measures with fair use.

Chamberlain had the burden to prove that (1) they had ownership of a copyrighted work, (2) it was controlled by a technological measure that was circumvented, (3) third parties can access it (4) without authorization in a way that (5) infringes rights protected by the Copyright Act due to a product created, advertised, or provided by the defendant Skylink. Once the plaintiff proves those five they must also prove that the defendant trafficked in a product which was (i) designed or produced primarily for circumvention; (ii) made available despite only limited commercial significance other than circumvention; or (iii) marketed for use in circumvention of the controlling technological measure. Chamberlain never claimed that Skylink infringed its copyrights or contributed to third-party infringement nor did it show that its users were unauthorized to use the product. As Chamberlain failed to show the fourth and fifth requirements to prove their claim, the Federal Circuit affirmed the District Court's grant of summary judgment to Skylink, writing,

Chamberlain, however, has failed to show not only the requisite lack of authorization, but also the necessary fifth element of its claim, the critical nexus between access and protection. Chamberlain neither alleged copyright infringement nor explained how the access provided by the Model 39 transmitter facilitates the infringement of any right that the Copyright Act protects. There can therefore be no reasonable relationship between the access that homeowners gain to Chamberlain's copyrighted software when using Skylink's Model 39 transmitter and the protections that the Copyright Act grants to Chamberlain.

== See also ==
- Universal City Studios, Inc. v. Reimerdes
- Lexmark Int'l v. Static Control Components
