= Export function =

The Export function is an idea used in economic theories to measure exports. The total amount of exports, E, in a nation is mainly affected by two variables, see import, the total foreign absorption and the real exchange rate.

E = E(A*,σ) Where A* and σ are variable functions related to the total foreign absorption and the real exchange rate.

For an explanation of the positive and negative relationship between exports and absorption and the real exchange rate, see import

== See also ==
- Import
- export
- elasticity (economics)
