= Kirtsaeng v. John Wiley & Sons, Inc. =

- Supreme Court of the United States

Argued October 29, 2012 Decided March 19, 2013
- Full case name: Supap Kirtsaeng, dba Bluechristine99, Petitioner v. John Wiley & Sons, Inc.
- Docket no.: 11-697
- Citations: 568 U.S. 519 (more) 133 S. Ct. 1351; 185 L. Ed. 2d 392; 2013 U.S. LEXIS 2371; 106 U.S.P.Q.2d 1001; 2013 ILRC 1487; 35 ILRD 648; 35 ITRD 1049; 41 Med. L. Rptr. 1441; 81 U.S.L.W. 4167
- Opinion announcement: Opinion announcement

Case history
- Prior: Defendant prohibited from raising argument, No. 1:08-cv-07834, 2009 WL 3364037 (S.D.N.Y. Oct. 19, 2009) and held liable, unreported (2010); affirmed. 654 F.3d 210 (2d Cir. 2011); cert. granted, 566 U.S. 936 (2012).
- Subsequent: Remanded, 713 F.3d 1142 (2d Cir. 2013); motion for attorneys' fees denied, 109 U.S.P.Q.2d 1242 (S.D.N.Y. 2013); affirmed, 605 F. App'x 48 (2d Cir. 2015); cert. granted, 136 S. Ct. 890 (2016); vacated and remanded, 136 S. Ct. 1979 (2016); remanded, 653 F. App'x 82 (2d Cir. 2016); motion for attorneys' fees denied, 121 U.S.P.Q.2d 1457 (S.D.N.Y. 2016).

Holding
- The first-sale doctrine applies to copies of a copyrighted work lawfully made abroad.

Court membership
- Chief Justice John Roberts Associate Justices Antonin Scalia · Anthony Kennedy; Clarence Thomas · Ruth Bader Ginsburg; Stephen Breyer · Samuel Alito; Sonia Sotomayor · Elena Kagan

Case opinions
- Majority: Breyer, joined by Roberts, Thomas, Alito, Sotomayor, Kagan
- Concurrence: Kagan, joined by Alito
- Dissent: Ginsburg, joined by Kennedy; Scalia (except Parts III and V–B–1)

Laws applied
- Copyright Act of 1976

Kirtsaeng v. John Wiley & Sons, Inc., 568 U.S. 519 (2013), is a United States Supreme Court copyright decision in which the Court held, 6–3, that the first-sale doctrine exhausts copyright of the works lawfully made or purchased abroad.

== Background ==
In 2008, John Wiley & Sons, Inc. filed suit against Thailand native Supap Kirtsaeng over the sale of foreign edition textbooks made outside of the United States marked for sale exclusively abroad which Kirtsaeng imported into the United States. When Kirtsaeng moved to the US in 1997 to pursue an undergraduate degree in mathematics at Cornell University, he discovered that textbooks (not just those published by Wiley, but of other publishers too) were considerably more expensive to buy in the United States than in his home country. Kirtsaeng asked his relatives from Thailand to buy such books at home and ship them to him to sell at a profit. He sold the imported books on eBay, making $1.2 million in revenue, although the parties disputed the net profit amount.

Wiley sued Kirtsaeng for copyright infringement and won in two lower courts. The Second Circuit Court of Appeals upheld the ban on importation of copyrighted works without the authority of the U.S. copyright owner; this set up a Circuit split with the Third Circuit and the Ninth Circuit, which had had variant approaches to the same question in other cases.

Kirtsaeng then appealed to the Supreme Court, which granted the writ of certiorari on April 16, 2012. Oral argument was held October 29, and judgment was issued March 19, 2013.

== Decision ==
In 2013, the U.S. Supreme Court reversed the Second Circuit and held that Kirtsaeng's sale of lawfully-made copies purchased overseas was protected by the first-sale doctrine. The Court held that the first sale doctrine applies to goods manufactured outside of the United States, and the protections and exceptions offered by the Copyright Act to works "lawfully made under this title" is not limited by geography. Rather, it applies to all copies legally made anywhere, not just in the United States. So, wherever a copy of a book is first made and lawfully sold, it can be resold in the U.S. without permission from the publisher.

Justice Stephen Breyer wrote the opinion of the court which, was joined by five Justices (Roberts, Thomas, Alito, Sotomayor, and Kagan). In their argument, the majority rejected the purposivist approach advocated by most dissenters, and instead focused on a literalist-type analysis of the intent of the Congress. Breyer wrote, that because the first sale doctrine originated as a common law doctrine that was later codified by statute, Congress is presumed to "retain the substance of the common law", and that the common law does not support geographical limitations. Since the Congress did not explicitly abrogate this common law doctrine in the Copyright Act of 1976, the majority concluded that the old rule remains in place.

Justice Elena Kagan also wrote a separate concurring opinion, signed by Samuel Alito. Their concurrence suggested that Congress could change the law to reverse the majority decision.

Justice Ruth Bader Ginsburg dissented, joined by Anthony Kennedy and Antonin Scalia. In Ginsburg's view, "lawfully made" means "subject to the authority of" and therefore the copies must be made domestically because "The Copyright Act, it has been observed time and again, does not apply extraterritorially." Thus, she argued that the textbooks purchased and sold by Kirtsaeng were not subject to the US Copyright Act at the time of purchase.

The majority opinion also notes the significant negative impacts, pointed out by several amici, that would occur if the Court were to reject international exhaustion principles:

Associations of libraries, used-book dealers, technology companies, consumer-goods retailers, and museums point to various ways in which a geographical interpretation would fail to further basic constitutional copyright objectives, in particular "promot[ing] the Progress of Science and useful Arts." U. S. Const., Art. I, §8, cl. 8.

It notes that libraries have pointed to the 200 million foreign made works in their collections; that used bookstores have purchased books made abroad and that it cannot always easily predict whether the copy was made domestically or abroad; that "automobiles, microwaves, calculators, mobile phones, tablets, and personal computers" contain copyrightable software that would prevent the resale of even a car without permission of the rightholder of every copyrighted piece; that retailers noted that over $2.3 trillion worth of foreign produced goods were imported in the United States in 2011 that may contain copyrighted packaging and $220 billion of which constituted traditional copyrighted work; and that museums' ability to display foreign made art would be impeded. Thus,

reliance upon the [international exhaustion in the] 'first sale' doctrine is deeply embedded in the practices of those, such as book sellers, libraries, museums, and retailers, who have long relied upon its protection.

== Reactions ==
In law, Kirtsaeng has had the effect of causing a fresh look at the issue of "international exhaustion" in the patent context. The Federal Circuit in the 2001 Jazz Photo v. US International Trade Commission case had held that lawful sales of patented goods outside the US did not give rise to patent exhaustion inside the U.S. In a 2015 order in Lexmark v. Impression Products, the Federal Circuit sua sponte (unprompted) called for briefing and amicus curiae participation in an en banc consideration of whether:

In light of Kirtsaeng v. John Wiley & Sons, Inc., 133 S. Ct. 1351 (2012), should this court overrule Jazz Photo Corp. v. International Trade Commission, 264 F.3d 1094 (Fed. Cir. 2001), to the extent it ruled that a sale of a patented item outside the United States never gives rise to United States patent exhaustion.

Similarly, an effort by academic publisher Pearson to control after-market textbook sales on the basis of trademark was dismissed, citing Kirtsaeng.

In educational publishing, Wiley, the Kirtsaeng plaintiff that lost the case, increased its prices for the international editions as well as the international student editions and cited Kirtsaeng.

The decision also had an outcome-determinative effect on the long-pending dispute between Omega watches (a division of Swatch) and the retailer Costco. Whereas Omega had initially prevailed in the Ninth Circuit, the same way that John Wiley had, the decision was reversed after the United States Supreme Court decided Kirtsaeng.

== See also ==
- Grey market
- Quality King v. L'anza, 523 U.S. 135 (1998) – same result, but for goods that were made in the U.S., exported, then re-imported
- Parallel import
