= Jazz Photo Corp. v. United States International Trade Commission =

- Court: United States Court of Appeals for the Federal Circuit
- Full case name: Jazz Photo Corporation, and Dynatec International, Inc., and Opticolor, Inc. v. International Trade Commission, and Fuji Photo Film Co., Ltd., Intervenor
- Decided: August 21, 2001
- Citations: 264 F.3d 1094; 59 U.S.P.Q.2d 1907

Case history
- Subsequent history: Rehearing and rehearing en banc denied, November 9, 2001.

Court membership
- Judges sitting: Pauline Newman, Paul Redmond Michel, Arthur J. Gajarsa

Case opinions
- Majority: Newman, joined by a unanimous court

Jazz Photo Corp. v. United States International Trade Commission, 264 F.3d 1094 (Fed. Cir. 2001), was a case in which the United States Court of Appeals for the Federal Circuit clarified the law of repair and reconstruction (permitting the owner of a patented item to fix the item when it breaks, but not to essentially build a new item from the parts of an old one), holding that it was not a patent infringement for one party to restore another party's patented "one-use" camera to be used a second time.

== Facts ==
A company called Polytech Enterprise Limited acquired used disposable cameras which had been manufactured by Fuji Photo Film Co., Ltd. and sold by Fuji to consumers. Fuji owned several patents on the technology used in the cameras. Polytech refurbished the cameras through a process which included fitting the camera with new film, and in some instances with new flash batteries, repairing the camera case to exclude light following the film reloading operation, repackaging, and relabeling under the trademark of Jazz Photo Corp. The cameras were brought to China to be refurbished, and Jazz Photo then reimported them into the United States for sale.

The United States Customs Service intercepted two shipments of these cameras, and sought to prevent their entry into the United States on the grounds that they infringed Fuji's patents. Jazz Photo objected, asserting that the patents were not infringed because, rather than build new cameras incorporating the proprietary technology, Jazz Photo had simply purchased Fuji's own cameras and repaired them.

== Opinion ==
The Federal Circuit, in an opinion written by Judge Pauline Newman, concluded that Jazz Photo was correct. The court clarified the line between reconstruction - building a new copy of a patented invention - and permissible repair.

The court indicated that "[w]hile ownership of a patented article does not include the right to make a substantially new article, it does include the right to preserve the useful life of the original article." The opinion then recounted the common law history of repair-reconstruction law, before finally determining that Jazz Photo's actions amounted to repair. The court held that Jazz Photo had legally acquired patented inventions, and, rather than infringe on Fuji's patent by reverse engineering, manufacturing, and selling a new product, it opted to refurbish existing items to extend their useful lives.

== Continued viability questioned ==
In April 2014, the Federal Circuit sua sponte called for briefing and amicus curiae participation in an en banc consideration of whether Jazz Photo should be overruled in light of the recent Supreme Court decision in the Kirtsaeng case. The court ordered:

In light of Kirtsaeng v. John Wiley & Sons, Inc., 133 S. Ct. 1351 (2012), should this court overrule Jazz Photo Corp. v. International Trade Commission, 264 F.3d 1094 (Fed. Cir. 2001), to the extent it ruled that a sale of a patented item outside the United States never gives rise to United States patent exhaustion.

The Federal Circuit, en banc, reaffirmed its holding from Jazz Photo in Lexmark International, Inc. v. Impression Products, Inc.

== See also ==
- Right to repair
