= Impression Products, Inc. v. Lexmark International, Inc. =

- Supreme Court of the United States

Argued March 21, 2017 Decided May 30, 2017
- Full case name: Impression Products, Inc. v. Lexmark International, Inc.
- Docket no.: 15-1189
- Citations: 581 U.S. 360 (more) 137 S. Ct. 1523; 198 L. Ed. 2d 1; 2017 U.S. LEXIS 3397; 85 U.S.L.W. 4279; 122 U.S.P.Q.2d 1605
- Argument: Oral argument

Case history
- Prior: Lexmark Int'l, Inc. v. Ink Techs. Printer Supplies, LLC, 9 F. Supp. 3d 830 (S.D. Ohio 2014); No. 1:10-cv-564, 2014 WL 1276133 (S.D. Ohio Mar. 27, 2014); affirmed in part, reversed in part sub nom., Lexmark Int'l, Inc. v. Impression Prod., Inc., 816 F.3d 721 (Fed. Cir. 2016); cert. granted, 137 S. Ct. 546 (2016).

Holding
- Patent holders give up their patent rights upon the first sale of product, domestically or overseas.

Court membership
- Chief Justice John Roberts Associate Justices Anthony Kennedy · Clarence Thomas; Ruth Bader Ginsburg · Stephen Breyer; Samuel Alito · Sonia Sotomayor; Elena Kagan · Neil Gorsuch

Case opinions
- Majority: Roberts, joined by Kennedy, Thomas, Breyer, Alito, Sotomayor, Kagan
- Concur/dissent: Ginsburg

Laws applied
- 35 U.S.C. § 154(a)

Impression Products, Inc. v. Lexmark International, Inc., 581 U.S. 360 (2017), is a decision of the Supreme Court of the United States on the exhaustion doctrine in patent law in which the Court held that after the sale of a patented item, the patent holder cannot sue for patent infringement relating to further use of that item, even when in violation of a contract with a customer or imported from outside the United States. The case concerned a patent infringement lawsuit brought by Lexmark against Impression Products, Inc., which bought used ink cartridges, refilled them, replaced a microchip on the cartridge to circumvent a digital rights management scheme, and then resold them. Lexmark argued that as they own several patents related to the ink cartridges, Impression Products was violating their patent rights. The U.S. Supreme Court, reversing a 2016 decision of the Federal Circuit, held that the exhaustion doctrine prevented Lexmark's patent infringement lawsuit, although Lexmark could enforce restrictions on use or resale of its contracts with direct purchasers under regular contract law (but not as a patent infringement lawsuit). Besides printer and ink manufacturers, the decision of the case could affect the markets of high tech consumer goods and prescription drugs.

== Background ==
=== Factual setting ===
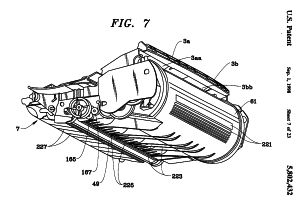
Drawing of toner cartridge from one of Lexmark's patents

Lexmark International, Inc. makes and sells printers and toner cartridges for its printers. Lexmark owns a number of patents that cover its cartridges and their use. Lexmark sold the cartridges at issue in this case—some in the United States and some abroad.

==== Domestic sales ====
Lexmark's domestic sales were in two categories. A "Regular Cartridge" is sold at "list price" and confers an absolute title and property right on the buyer. (Note: This litigation does not involve these domestically sold cartridges.) A "Return Program Cartridge" is sold at a discount of about 20 percent, and is subject to post-sale restrictions: The buyer may not reuse the cartridge after the toner runs out and may not transfer it to anybody else. The first branch of the case turns on the legal status of these post-sale restrictions.

Lexmark manufactured the toner cartridges with microchips in them, which send signals to the printers indicating toner level. When the amount of toner in a cartridge falls below a certain level, the printer will not operate with that cartridge. Also, the printer will not operate with a Return Program Cartridge that has been refilled by a third party. Thus, Lexmark's technology prevented violation of the post-sale restriction against refilling the Return Program Cartridges. The Regular Cartridges do not have this anti-refill feature and can therefore be refilled and reused (but they cost 20 percent more). (Note: It was stipulated that the 20% price difference "reflects the value of the property interest and use rights conveyed to the purchaser under the express terms of the conditional sale contract and conditional single-use license conferred by Lexmark.")

"To circumvent this technological measure," however, "third parties have 'hacked' the Lexmark microchips. They created their own "unauthorized replacement" microchips that, when installed in a Return Program cartridge, fool the printer into allowing reuse of that cartridge. Various companies (Note: For example, Static Control Components, Inc., which became involved in related litigation with Lexmark. See, e.g., Static Control Components, Inc. v. Lexmark Int'l, Inc., 487 F. Supp. 2d 830 (E.D. Ky. 2007).) purchase used Return Program Cartridges from the customers who bought them from Lexmark. They replace the microchips with "unauthorized replacement" microchips, refill the cartridges with toner, and sell the "re-manufactured" cartridges to resellers such as Impression Products for marketing to consumers for use with Lexmark printers. Lexmark had previously argued in Lexmark International, Inc. v. Static Control Components, Inc. that replacing these microchips violated copyright law and the Digital Millennium Copyright Act (DMCA), but both federal and the Supreme Court have ruled against Lexmark, affirming that replacing the microchips is not in violation of copyright.

==== Imported cartridges ====
The second branch of the case involves cartridges that Lexmark sold outside the US. While some of the foreign-sold cartridges were Regular Cartridges and some were Return Program Cartridges, this branch of the case does not involve any distinction among the two types of imported cartridges.

=== Trial court decision ===
The district court granted Impression's motion to dismiss Lexmark's claim of infringement involving the single-use cartridges Lexmark had first sold in the United States. The district court concluded that the Supreme Court in Quanta Computer, Inc. v. LG Electronics, Inc. found exhaustion where "the Supreme Court determined that the agreements [at issue] broadly authorized Intel [the seller] to sell the licensed products without restrictions or conditions." The district court said "that Quanta overruled Mallinckrodt sub silentio," and therefore "those post-sale use restrictions do not prevent patent rights from being exhausted given that the initial sales were authorized and unrestricted."

The district court held, however, that the exhaustion doctrine did not apply to the cartridges that Lexmark had sold abroad. It said that international exhaustion did not apply to patents because Kirtsaeng v. John Wiley & Sons, Inc., which established international exhaustion in at least some cases, applied only to copyrights. The court therefore denied Impression's motion to dismiss Lexmark's claim of infringement involving the cartridges Lexmark had sold abroad.

=== Government amicus curiae position ===
In its amicus curiae brief, the US Government argued that Mallinckrodt had been wrongly decided in 1992 and in any case it had been overruled sub silentio in Quanta. It stated:

In the view of the United States, the first authorized sale of a patented article in the United States wholly exhausts the patentee's exclusive rights in that article, notwithstanding any post-sale restriction imposed by the patentee.

The government also argued that the decision of Jazz Photo Corp. v. United States International Trade Commission (2001) should be partially overruled in light of Kirtsaeng insofar as it held that foreign sales can never exhaust US patent rights. When the patentee neither makes nor authorizes a foreign sale, as occurred in Boesch v. Graff, it is proper to say no exhaustion occurred. But when the patentee makes or authorizes a foreign sale, and fails expressly to reserve its US rights, then exhaustion should be found. In the present case, Lexmark made the foreign sales and failed to expressly reserve its US rights; therefore, the sale exhausted the patent rights.

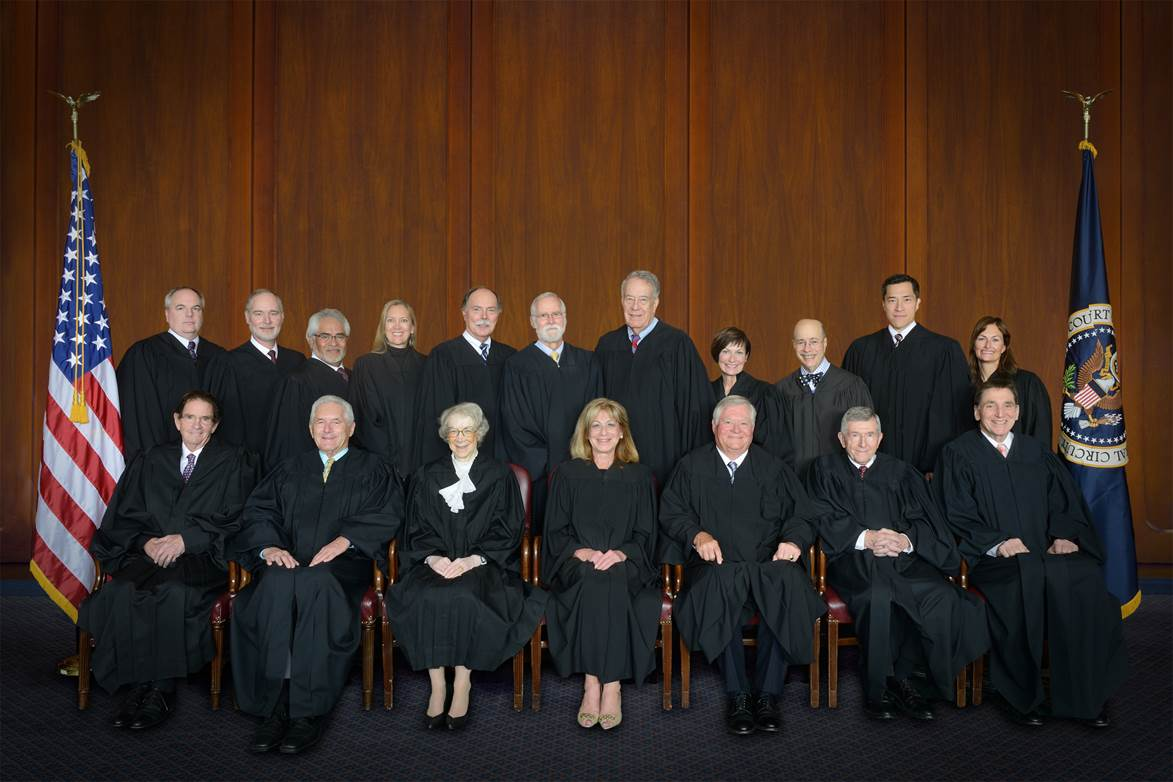
Judges of the Federal Circuit

== Federal Circuit decision ==
Federal Circuit oral argument on March 6, 2015.

Federal Circuit re-argument en banc on October 15, 2015.

The parties each appealed. After a three judge panel had heard oral argument the Federal Circuit sua sponte set the case for argument en banc in the first instance and invited the filing of amicus curiae briefs.

=== Majority opinion ===
Judge Taranto, writing for a 10-2 majority, reaffirmed both of the prior Federal Circuit rulings. In summary, the court held:

First, we adhere to the holding of Mallinckrodt, Inc. v. Medipart, Inc. that a patentee, when selling a patented article subject to a single-use/no-resale restriction that is lawful and clearly communicated to the purchaser, does not by that sale give the buyer, or downstream buyers, the resale/reuse authority that has been expressly denied. Such resale or reuse, when contrary to the known, lawful limits on the authority conferred at the time of the original sale, remains unauthorized and therefore remains infringing conduct under the terms of § 271. Under Supreme Court precedent, a patentee may preserve its § 271 rights through such restrictions when licensing others to make and sell patented articles; Mallinckrodt held that there is no sound legal basis for denying the same ability to the patentee that makes and sells the articles itself. We find Mallinckrodt's principle to remain sound after the Supreme Court's decision in Quanta Computer, Inc. v. LG Electronics, Inc. . . .

Second, we adhere to the holding of Jazz Photo Corp. v. International Trade Comm'n, that a U.S. patentee, merely by selling or authorizing the sale of a U.S.-patented article abroad, does not authorize the buyer to import the article and sell and use it in the United States, which are infringing acts in the absence of patentee-conferred authority. Jazz Photo's no-exhaustion ruling recognizes that foreign markets under foreign sovereign control are not equivalent to the U.S. markets under U.S. control in which a U.S. patentee's sale presumptively exhausts its rights in the article sold. A buyer may still rely on a foreign sale as a defense to infringement, but only by establishing an express or implied license—a defense separate from exhaustion, as Quanta holds—based on patentee communications or other circumstances of the sale. We conclude that Jazz Photo's no-exhaustion principle remains sound after the Supreme Court's decision in Kirtsaeng v. John Wiley & Sons, Inc., in which the Court did not address patent law or whether a foreign sale should be viewed as conferring authority to engage in otherwise-infringing domestic acts. Kirtsaeng is a copyright case holding that 17 U.S.C. § 109(a) entitles owners of copyrighted articles to take certain acts "without the authority" of the copyright holder. There is no counterpart to that provision in the Patent Act, under which a foreign sale is properly treated as neither conclusively nor even presumptively exhausting the U.S. patentee's rights in the United States.

==== Domestic exhaustion ====
In this part of its opinion, the Federal Circuit reaffirmed its Mallincrodt decision and rejected contentions that Quanta had silently overruled it.

===== § 271 abrogates common-law rule =====
The court began by distinguishing the Patent Act's and Copyright Act's respective approaches to infringement. in 17 U.S.C. § 109(a) the Copyright Act says, "Notwithstanding the provisions of section 106(3)," defining infringement by selling, a purchaser "is entitled, without the authority of the copyright owner, to sell or otherwise dispose of the possession" of a purchased copy of a work. In contrast, the Patent Act contains no exhaustion provision. Therefore, the Patent Act requires a "conferral of 'authority' by the patentee . . . in order for the actions listed in § 271(a) not to constitute infringement." This means there must be "permission from the patentee" to avoid infringement. The court does not accept exhaustion as a form of "constructive" permission. Hence, if the patentee places explicit limits or conditions on its permission, they qualify the scope of the permission. This has the effect of limiting the common law.

===== General Talking Pictures rule applies to "conditional" sale =====
The court turned to the General Talking Pictures decision, (Note: General Talking Pictures Corp v Western Electric Co., 304 U.S. 175, 182 (1938) (upholding as legitimate field-of-use limitations on scope of patent licenses to make and sell amplifiers only in "non-commercial" field), affirmed on rehearing, 305 U.S. 124 (1938).) which holds "that Lexmark would not have exhausted its patent rights in those cartridges, upon the manufacturing licensee's sale (the first sale), if a buyer with knowledge of the restrictions resold or reused them in violation of the restrictions." Although the government in its amicus curiae brief and defendant Impression argue "that a different result is required—that Lexmark automatically lost its patent rights—simply because Lexmark sold the Return Program cartridges itself, subject to the same communicated restriction, rather than having left the manufacture and sale to others under license," the court does not accept that:

We conclude otherwise, as we did in Mallinckrodt and subsequent decisions. A sale made under a clearly communicated, otherwise-lawful restriction as to post-sale use or resale does not confer on the buyer and a subsequent purchaser the "authority" to engage in the use or resale that the restriction precludes. And there is no sound reason, and no Supreme Court precedent, requiring a distinction that gives less control to a practicing-entity patentee that makes and sells its own product than to a non-practicing-entity patentee that licenses others to make and sell the product. (Note: But see United States v. General Electric Co., in which the Court stated that it was well settled that "where a patentee makes the patented article and sells it, he can exercise no future control over what the purchaser may wish to do with the article after his purchase. It has passed beyond the scope of the patentee's rights." On the other hand, the Court said, "the question is a different one ... when we consider what a patentee who grants a license to one to make and vend the patented article may do in limiting the licensee in the exercise of the right to sell.")

===== Quanta distinguishable and inapplicable =====
The court turned to the Quanta decision and found it inapplicable to the present issues. "'Quanta did not involve a patentee's sale at all, let alone one subject to a restriction or, more particularly, a single-use/no-resale restriction." Rather, Quanta involved a patentee's (LGE's) license to a manufacturer (Intel) that sold to the accused infringer (Quanta). LGE had not limited Intel's license to manufacture the patented product, although it imposed contractual obligations on Intel. "No conditions limited Intel's authority to sell products substantially embodying the patents." The Federal Circuit emphasized: "There were no patentee sales, and there were no restrictions on the sales made by the licensee." Those facts were removed from the case at bar. Thus the Quanta "Court's discussion of that issue does not undermine Mallinckrodt's ruling that a patentee can preserve its patent rights through restrictions on its sales." The Federal Circuit also emphasized as significant the failure of the Quanta Court to explicitly repudiate Mallinckrodt despite the fact that in its amicus brief "the government prominently featured an argument that Mallinckrodt was incorrect and should be repudiated."

===== Prior cases =====
The court then turned to the prior Supreme Court cases. Reviewing them, it found that although they used sweeping language that a patentee's sale of the patented product placed it beyond the reach of the patent, so that no post-sale restriction could be enforced under the patent laws, that language went beyond the actual facts of the cases. First, the sales were in most cases without any condition or restriction on what the buyer might do with the product. Second, in the cases where an explicit condition or restriction was imposed, the case involved a tie-in or a price-fix.

The Court conceded that in the General Electric case, the Supreme Court had said: "It is well settled, as already said, that where a patentee makes the patented article, and sells it, he can exercise no future control over what the purchaser may wish to do with the article after his purchase. It has passed beyond the scope of the patentee's rights." But that case involved an antitrust challenge to GE's distribution of lamps that did not meet that description. The case involved price restrictions on a licensed manufacturer. The Federal Circuit then explained that the word "settled" in the Supreme Court's statement had a special, narrow meaning: "We read that language to deem 'settled' only what was settled in the cited precedents—a patentee's sales without restrictions exhaust patent rights in the item sold." Thus, the Supreme Court's sweeping exhaustion language applies precedentially only to cases in which either the sale was without condition or restriction or else the sale was made with a tie-in or price-fixing condition. "But the Court did not rule that all restrictions on a patentee's sale were ineffective to preserve the patentee's patent-law rights."

Similarly, in United States v. Univis Lens Co., the Supreme Court's sweeping language must now be limited to the factual context of the case:

Moreover, although some language in Univis, like language in other decisions in the area, can be taken out of context and read as going beyond the specific restrictions involved, the most the Court ruled, even as to patent law all by itself, was that a vertical price-control restriction was ineffective to preserve patent rights after sales of articles embodying the patents. While Univis is controlling on what it decided on the issues before it, we do not think it appropriate to give broad effect to language in Univis, taken out of context, to support an otherwise-unjustified conclusion here on a question not faced there.

The Federal Circuit therefore drew this conclusion from the past series of Supreme Court cases on exhaustion:

For the foregoing reasons, we think that the best lesson to draw from the Supreme Court's precedents, as applied to the question before us, is that a patentee may preserve its patent rights by otherwise-proper restrictions when it makes and sells patented articles itself and not only when it contracts out manufacturing and sales.

===== Patent law trumps common law =====
The Federal Circuit returned to the common law and Lord Coke's commentary on it. Again, the court insisted that Congress had overridden the common law's prohibitions on post-sale restraints, in order to promote technological progress:

[W]hatever considerations might go into a jurisdiction's choice as to the background rule for personal property in general, lawmaking authorities may reasonably make different choices for particular kinds of property. Notably, as to intellectual property in its various forms, Congress, implementing the Constitution, has long deemed it important to incentivize creation and disclosure through grants to the creator of rights to exclude others for a time. . . . That overriding legislative prescription removes the patented-article sale from the scope of Lord Coke's 1628 description of his country's general judicially fashioned property law. . . . In short, notwithstanding Lord Coke's description of English general personal-property judge-made law, the patent-specific statutory analysis must govern here.

===== Likely effects on public =====
The court then turned to what it called "the likely real-world consequences of one answer or another to the exhaustion question presented here." The court noted that in Kirtsaeng the Supreme Court had envisioned serious adverse effects on competition unless Coke's 1628 property law rules were followed. The Federal Circuit said that did not apply to patents:

[W]e see no basis for predicting the extreme, lop-sided impacts the Court found plausible in Kirtsaeng in different circumstances. Mallinckrodt has been the governing case law since 1992 and has been reiterated in subsequent precedent. And yet we have been given no reliable demonstration of widespread problems not being solved in the marketplace. Given General Talking Pictures, the only question is about patentees' ability to do for their own sales what they already can do by contracting out their manufacturing and sales. Regarding the specific scenario we are addressing today—in which the patentee has sought to preserve its patent rights by conditioning its first sale on a single-use/no-resale restriction of which the accused infringer had adequate notice at the time of purchase—we have been given no proof of a significant problem with enforcing patent rights.

Furthermore, the Federal Circuit maintained, the conduct challenged here can have benefits. Under Lexmark's program, customers who agree to the restriction pay a lower price than those who do not. It could be that the companies that refill the cartridges use inferior products that could harm the Lexmark machines, which "could harm Lexmark's reputation." To assume that the restrictions are illegitimate would run counter to the trends "over the last four decades, that have displaced the strict condemnation of various vertical restrictions that characterized" earlier antitrust and patent-misuse law in the first part of the twentieth century. "Field-of-use, territorial, and other limitations on intellectual property licenses may serve procompetitive ends by allowing the licensor to exploit its property as efficiently and effectively as possible." Therefore, the court concluded it is appropriate to apply to post-sale restrictions the same tolerance that the General Talking Pictures doctrine accords limitations in manufacturing licenses.

==== International exhaustion ====
In this part of its opinion, the Federal Circuit reaffirmed its Jazz Photo opinion and rejected contentions that Kirtsaeng had undermined the basis for Jazz Photo. The Federal Circuit insisted that "Kirtsaeng says nothing about patent law."

The court emphasized the differences between patent law and copyright law. For example, patent law gives patentees an exclusive right to use of the invention but copyright law gives no general exclusionary right as to use (it gives exclusive public performance and display "use" rights, but not others). Also, it is much more costly and time-consuming to obtain a patent than a copyright. The court did not explain, however, the way that or other differences between copyrights and patents called for contrary results as to international exhaustion.

The court did say that the US patent statute gives patentees the reward available from "sales in American markets, not from sales in foreign markets." A sale in a foreign market therefore does not furnish a proper basis for finding exhaustion. "American markets differ substantially from markets in many other countries, and not just because of disparities in wealth that can lead to dramatically different prices" in this country and abroad (as was the case in Kirtsaeng). "Government policies differ dramatically, including policies on price regulation and, most particularly, policies on the availability and scope of patent protection." The court did not explain further, however, whether and how such dramatic differences in policy applied to the toner cartridges at issue in the present case.

The court then turned to the only Supreme Court case on foreign exhaustion, Boesch v. Graff. In that case, Graff was the assignee of a US patent. Boesch bought the product from a German supplier who had a prior-user right under German law to make and sell the product, because the supplier had begun activity before the application for the German counterpart patent was filed. The US assignee and the inventor had no connection with Boesch. When Graff imported the product into the US, Boesch sued for infringement. The US courts found Boesch liable. The rights that Boesch had under German law did not entitle him to import the product into the US. That is governed by US law. The US patentee had never "received any royalty or given any license to use the patented article in any part of the United States." Accordingly, the court held, a foreign sale does not of its own force authorize importation into the US.

This does not mean, however, that a patentee by its conduct cannot waive its US rights, be stopped from asserting them, or be found to have granted an implied license.

The court expressed concern that overruling Jazz Photo would harm the US drug industry:

There seems to be no dispute that U.S.-patented medicines are often sold outside the United States at substantially lower prices than those charged here and, also, that the practice could be disrupted by the increased arbitrage opportunities that would come from deeming U.S. rights eliminated by a foreign sale made or authorized by the U.S. patentee.

Finally, the court rejected a proposal that exhaustion should be presumed unless the patentee express states that it reserves its US rights. Foreign governments might "prohibit sellers from stating reservations of rights that would make importation into and sale in the United States more difficult." Also: "Intermediary companies between the foreign purchase and the importation into the United States may be created that make it difficult for the U.S. patentee to carry an affirmative burden of proving adequate notice of reservations attached to a foreign-sold article."

=== Dissenting opinion ===
Judge Dyk, joined by Judge Hughes, dissented from both branches of the court's exhaustion analysis. Judge Dyk summarized his dissent in these terms:

I would overrule our decision in Mallinckrodt as inconsistent with governing Supreme Court authority and overrule Jazz Photo to the extent that it imposes a blanket ban on foreign exhaustion. I would recognize foreign exhaustion where the U.S. rights holder has not notified the buyer of its retention of the U.S. patent rights.

==== Domestic exhaustion ====
In this part of the dissent, Judge Dyk argued that the majority had misunderstood the Supreme Court's exhaustion jurisprudence in order to substitute its own ideas of the proper balance between patent rights and public rights. He began by saying:

First, I agree with the government that Mallinckrodt was wrong when decided, and in any event cannot be reconciled with the Supreme Court's recent decision in Quanta Computer, Inc. v. LG Electronics, Inc. We exceed our role as a subordinate court by declining to follow the explicit domestic exhaustion rule announced by the Supreme Court.

He argued that since 1850 the Supreme Court has held that a sale by the patentee or its licensee exhausts all patent rights. In such cases, "The question of whether the seller has 'authorized' the buyer to use or resell the item is simply irrelevant." Post-sale restrictions could not be enforced under federal patent law. The only Supreme Court case to depart from that principle was Henry v. A.B. Dick Co., and it was explicitly overruled five years later by Motion Picture Patents Co. v. Universal Film Mfg. Co. The principle of the overruled Dick case that a patentee could impost a post-sale restriction by giving a buyer notice of it was "the same as the panel's holding in Mallinckrodt and the majority's holding in this case."

He insisted that the majority opinion misread the Motion Picture Patents decision by asserting "that it only 'held particular restrictions improper' . . . but 'did not rule that all restrictions on a patentee's sale were ineffective to preserve the patentee's patent-law rights.'" He explained:

That is not accurate. Motion Picture Patents did not leave behind the remnants of A.B. Dick—minus tie-ins and resale price maintenance. To the contrary, the Court in Motion Picture Patents found that "[t]he patent law furnishes no warrant for" the restrictions imposed by the patent owner.

Later cases, such as Quanta, confirmed this "broad patent exhaustion rule [in Motion Picture Patents] and left no room for a resurrection of A.B. Dick."

He next turned to the majority's referenced to "conditional sales" and "unconditional sales," and said that the majority misconstrued the terms. "Conditional sales," he said, as used in pre-Mallinckrodt case law referred only to the retention of title for a security interest in installment purchases. "In other words, a sale with restrictions could nonetheless be an 'unconditional' sale in which title passes, with the restrictions invalid under the patent laws because of exhaustion."

He then criticized the majority for making up special rules for patent cases that differed from the common law and general legal principles, citing Supreme Court admonitions not to do that--"The Supreme Court has repeatedly instructed us not to ignore traditional legal principles to fashion rules 'unique to patent disputes.'" (Note: He cited as examples: eBay Inc. v. MercExchange, L.L.C., 547 U.S. 388, 393 (2006); Global–Tech Appliances, Inc. v. SEB S.A., 563 U.S. 754 (2011); MedImmune, Inc. v. Genentech, Inc., 549 U.S. 118, 132 n. 11 (2007).)

Finally, Judge Dyk took issue on multiple grounds with the majority's efforts to distinguish and limit the Supreme Court's rulings. "The majority's justifications for refusing to follow Supreme Court authority establishing the exhaustion rule misconceive our role as a subordinate court." Each justification in the majority decision was unsupportable, he said.

- "First, the majority characterizes the statement of the exhaustion rule in the Supreme Court cases as mere dictum because in those cases there was either no restriction imposed or the restriction would otherwise violate the antitrust laws. But the cases impose no such qualification on the rule announced. The Supreme Court has repeatedly advised the courts of appeals that our task is to follow the rules proclaimed by the Court, and not to attempt to distinguish Supreme Court cases on their facts."
- "Second, the majority relies on 35 U.S.C. §§ 271(a) and 154(a)(1) to suggest that a broad reading of the exhaustion doctrine is inconsistent with statutory language making an act of infringement . . . any use or sale of a patented invention 'without authority' of the patent owner, and providing the patent owner with a 'right to exclude.'" But the patent exhaustion doctrine is a limitation on the operation of those sections, and applies notwithstanding them.
- "Third, the majority claims that giving full sweep to the articulation of the exhaustion doctrine in Quanta and other cases would be inconsistent with the Supreme Court's decision in General Talking Pictures Corp. v. Western Electric Co. . . . The majority suggests it would be incongruous if 'a patentee cannot preserve its patent rights against uses of a patented article . . . if, instead of licensing someone else to make and sell the article, it chooses to make and sell the article itself.' "

But General Talking Pictures was a case of a license to manufacture in a limited field, not a sale with a post-sale restriction. The cases recognize that distinction. Thus, in Quanta the Supreme Court stated that General Talking Pictures "held that exhaustion did not apply because the manufacturer had no authority to sell the amplifiers for commercial use." And where the manufacturer in that case (Intel) did have a general authority to make and sell, the Supreme Court held that exhaustion applied to the sale.

The majority found "tension" between "the Supreme Court's broad statement of the exhaustion rule and General Talking Pictures" and sought to resolve it by extending the rule of General Talking Pictures and contracting the exhaustion doctrine in the area of possible conflict. But, Dyk maintained:

[I]t is not our task to ignore Supreme Court rulings as "unjustifi[ed]" or "unsound" because they are purportedly inconsistent with other Supreme Court cases. The distinction between restrictions on sales (impermissible) and restrictions on licensees (permissible) exists in the Court's precedent, and it is not for us to decide if it is a sound distinction.

- "Finally, the majority proposes that we should somehow sustain the restriction here because it may be pro-competitive. Exhaustion does not turn on whether a particular post-sale restriction is desirable or undesirable, pro-competitive or anti-competitive, but whether the sale was authorized and the item has passed beyond the scope of the patent monopoly." Furthermore, the Supreme Court said in Kirtsaeng that a prohibition on resale is "manifestly anti-competitive."

Dyk concluded his discussion of domestic exhaustion with the statement: "There is, in sum, no colorable basis for the majority's failure to follow the exhaustion rule for domestic sales as articulated by the Court in Quanta and numerous other cases."

==== International exhaustion ====
In this part of the dissent, Judge Dyk argued for a nuanced balance that called for different results depending on whether the patentee was responsible for the sale abroad that was alleged to trigger exhaustion.

He began by pointing out that because Lexmark's foreign sales were made without any restrictions or reservations, "even under the majority's cramped view of exhaustion, there is no question that the sales would have exhausted Lexmark's domestic patent rights. The issue is whether the foreign location of the sale should lead to a different result, as we previously held in Jazz Photo."

He then turned to "the centerpiece of the majority's holding that there is a doctrinal blanket ban on foreign exhaustion, namely the Supreme Court's decision in Boesch v. Graff. But "Boesch announced no such blanket ban," he said. "It did not even involve an authorized sale by the holder of U.S. patent rights but rather a sale by a third party under a foreign law's prior use exception." (Note: Under German law, the defendant had a prior user right to use the invention because it had begun to do so before the patentee filed its patent application.) But "Boesch does not apply here because the foreign sales were made by Lexmark."

In every US lower court decision before Jazz Photo: "When the sale was made by an entity not holding U.S. patent rights, as in Boesch, or when the authorized foreign seller clearly reserved U.S. rights, there was no exhaustion." In contrast, "where the foreign sale was made by a seller holding U.S. patent rights without a contractual reservation of U.S. rights, exhaustion occurred as a result of an authorized foreign sale."

Dyk maintained that "Kirtsaeng provides significant guidance and cannot be dismissed as simply a copyright case, or as limited to the 'first sale' provision of the Copyright Act." Rather, the policies that animated Kirtsaeng typically apply to patent exhaustion. But because in some cases a difference may be significant, there should be abalanced approach. Dyk argued for "put[ting] the burden on the U.S. rights holder to provide notice of a reservation of U.S. rights to the purchaser." Thus, he "would recognize foreign exhaustion where the U.S. rights holder has not notified the buyer of its retention of the U.S. patent rights."

== Supreme Court ==
In March 2016, Impression filed a petition for certiorari in the U.S. Supreme Court. Impression presented these questions in its petition:

1. Whether a "conditional sale" that transfers title to the patented item while specifying post-sale restrictions on the article's use or resale avoids application of the patent exhaustion doctrine and therefore permits the enforcement of such post-sale restrictions through the patent law's infringement remedy.
2. Whether, in light of this Court's holding in Kirtsaeng v. John Wiley & Sons, Inc., 133 S. Ct. 1351, 1363 (2013), that the common law doctrine barring restraints on alienation that is the basis of exhaustion doctrine "makes no geographical distinctions," a sale of a patented article—authorized by the U.S. patentee—that takes place outside of the United States exhausts the U.S. patent rights in that article.

Supreme Court oral argument 03/21/17

On June 20, 2016, the Court invited the Solicitor General to file briefs in this case expressing the views of the United States. In October 2016, the government filed the requested amicus curiae brief. It recommended grant of certiorari on both questions. The brief argues that the "Federal Circuit's decision misreads" the Supreme Court's precedents and "would substantially erode the exhaustion doctrine." The Supreme Court granted certiorari on December 2, 2016 and heard oral argument in the case on March 21, 2017. The Court published its decisions on May 30, 2017.

=== Majority ===
A unanimous Court (Note: Justice Gorsuch joined the Court after oral arguments were heard and took no part in the consideration or decision of the case.) found that Lexmark exhausted its patent rights upon first sale domestically, even with the single-use/no-resale restrictions imposed by Lexmark in contracts with its customers, although such restrictions could be enforced under contract law. The Court noted that the exhaustion doctrine has a long history and that any change would have significant effects on commerce in the modern world, noting that "extending the patent rights beyond the first sale would clog the channels of commerce, with little benefit from the extra control that the patentees retain," noting that complex modern supply chains can involve large numbers of patents. (Note: Citing, inter alia, an amicus brief filed by Intel that a generic smartphone could practice an estimated 250,000 patents.) Chief Justice Roberts, in his opinion, compared the situation to automobile repair shops: "The business works because the shop can rest assured that, so long as those bringing in the cars own them, the shop is free to repair and resell those vehicles. That smooth flow of commerce would sputter if companies that make the thousands of parts that go into a vehicle could keep their patent rights after the first sale."

Seven justices joined the Court's opinion extending that reasoning to items imported from abroad. Lexmark had argued, and the Federal Circuit agreed, that sale abroad "does not trigger patent exhaustion unless the patentee 'expressly or implicitly transfers or licenses' its rights." The Court, however, ruled that "[a]n authorized sale outside the United States, just as one within the United States, exhausts all rights under the Patent Act." The Court relied on its 2013 decision in Kirtsaeng v. John Wiley & Sons, Inc. on a nearly identical issue under copyright law. Because the underlying statute was not clear as to its geographical scope, the Court in Kirtsaeng decided that, because the statute was based in the common law exhaustion doctrine, which is not limited in geographic extent, the statute at issue was therefore not intended to be limited to only U.S. sales. Applying the same principle to patent law, which historically has a close connection with copyright law, was "straightforward" and "the bond between [copyright and patent law] leaves no room for a rift on the question of international exhaustion".

=== Partial dissent ===
Justice Ginsburg dissented from the Court's holding with respect to imported items. Adhering to substantially the same reasoning of her dissent in Kirtsaeng, Justice Ginsburg argued that because patent law is territorial and the sale of an item abroad is "independent [...] of the U.S. patent system, it makes little sense to say that such a sale exhausts an inventor's U.S. patent rights." She would have upheld the Federal Circuit's decision that sale abroad does not exhaust a patentee's rights in the United States.

== Commentary ==
=== Gerstein ===
Robert M. Gerstein concluded that further review in the Supreme Court was likely:

Given the Supreme Court's interest in patent cases, a vigorous dissent in Lexmark that relies on a number of Supreme Court precedents, including Quanta and Kirtsaeng, and the position of the Justice Department that Quanta overruled Mallinckrodt, it would not be surprising to see the Supreme Court take up Lexmark in its next term.

=== Dodd and Dowd ===
Jeff C. Dodd and Matthew J. Dowd viewed the decision as an affirmation of strong patent rights:

Lexmark embraces a very strong view of patent rights and a narrow view of the scope of exhaustion. It affirms that patent holders have wide latitude to segment and control distribution in the market channels for products covered by patents. This latitude is particularly wide with respect to limiting the import into the United States of patented goods sold in authorized sales in foreign markets even where restrictions on resale were not proven to have been communicated to foreign buyers. Even so, the court left open the possibility that foreign sales, under the right circumstances, may incorporate an implied license to import and use the product within the United States.

=== Cukierski and Masia ===
Kevin J. Cukierski and Adam H. Masia see the decision as "pro-patent owner" but warn again premature celebration:

But take caution—it is likely that the Supreme Court will be asked to hear the case. Given the tension between this case and the Supreme Court's language in Quanta and Kirtsaeng, along with the discord at the district court level and among commentators before the Federal Circuit's decision, there's a good chance the Supreme Court will do so. Until the Supreme Court has its say, you should take precautions in case the Supreme Court takes an expansive view of patent exhaustion and decides to remove these exceptions.

=== "Without Precedent" ===
Another commentator (unsigned comment) indicated a skeptical view of the Federal Circuit's tendency to march to a different drummer. After quoting Judge Dyk's admonition, "We exceed our role as a subordinate court by declining to follow the explicit domestic exhaustion rule announced by the Supreme Court," he (or she) observed:

For present purposes, it is simply worth noting that the Federal Circuit appears to be inching closer again to the concept that patent law is simply a unique beast, with unique rules and requirements. The Supreme Court has taken a skeptical view of that approach in the past. And may well again.

=== Jahn, Pichler, and Lo ===
Paul Jahn, Rufus Pichler and Lincoln Lo raise many questions (mostly about "clear communication") about what the Lexmark majority opinion left unresolved:

- Conflict or tension with Quanta: "Quanta expressly distinguished implied licenses and exhaustion, holding that disclaimers of license rights are 'irrelevant' where 'the right to practice the patents is based not on implied license but on exhaustion.' " But "the Federal Circuit appears to treat exhaustion like an implied license—one that the patentee can disclaim by 'clearly communicate[d]' restrictions." Quanta appears to hold that the patentee's attempt to impose a post-sale restriction on a manufacturing licensee is ineffective if the license does not conform to the General Talking Pictures case.
- "[W]hat arrangement between a seller and buyer is sufficient to deny 'authority.'? It was undisputed in Lexmark that there was 'an express and enforceable contractual agreement' between Lexmark and each end-user, and that the no-resale and no-reuse restrictions were binding on end users. Yet throughout the Lexmark opinion, the majority suggests that restrictions may be sufficient if 'clearly communicated'—even if well short of a contractual meeting of the minds."
- Another way to put this is what is a "clear communication"? In Jazz Photo, the Federal Circuit noted that the "package instructions [were] not in the form of a contractual agreement by the purchaser to limit reuse of the cameras." Accordingly, "There was no showing of a 'meeting of the minds' whereby the purchaser, and those obtaining the purchaser's discarded camera, may be deemed to have breached a contract or violated a license limited to a single use of the camera." The writers conclude, therefore, "It is unclear if the Federal Circuit intended an expansion of the patentee-seller's ability to avoid exhaustion."
- Also, how clear must a "clear communication" be? "The Federal Circuit appears to limit infringement claims against subsequent downstream buyers to those 'having knowledge of the restrictions.' The appellate court did not elaborate on what defenses a subsequent downstream purchaser without knowledge may have, assuming no exhaustion. The court only mentions in passing that 'we do not have before us the questions that would arise, whether under principles governing bona fide purchasers or otherwise, if a downstream re-purchaser acquired a patented article with less than actual knowledge of the restriction.' "
- Finally, does the court's focus on "clear communication" have a negative impact on post-sale restrictions that a limited licensee under General Talking Pictures is required to impose? "The Federal Circuit suggested repeatedly that buyers' knowledge of the licensee's field of use limitation may be required for a licensee's sale to be non-exhaustive. While General Talking Pictures did not clearly resolve this question, many licensors have assumed that sales by a licensee outside of its licensed field are unauthorized altogether and are therefore non-exhaustive regardless of the purchaser's knowledge of the field of use limitation." Therefore, does the emphasis, here "on the buyer's knowledge, even if dicta, add to the uncertainty concerning this issue"?

=== Castanias, Nix, and Kazhdan ===
Gregory A. Castanias, Kelsey I. Nix, and Daniel Kazhdan also point to unresolved issues over which patent owners "must still be cautious":

Lexmark explicitly left open several fact-specific questions, including (i) what happens if someone acquires a patented article with "less than actual knowledge" of the restrictions placed on the original sale by the patent owner and (ii) when would a foreign buyer have an "implied license" to sell in the United States, independent of patent exhaustion. These issues will surely be raised in future cases.

=== Crouch ===
Dennis Crouch, in Patently-O commented on the issues and provided a summary of the merits briefs filed in the Supreme Court as of January 31, 2017. Crouch opposed the Federal Circuit's ruling on these grounds:

With personal property courts long ago rejected servitudes (such as use and resale restrictions) that bind subsequent purchasers. Unlike real property, personal property moves and is often transferred without substantial paperwork or record-keeping, and allowing a set of unique restrictions has the potential of gumming up the marketplace. The Federal Circuit in this case went all the way to the other side — holding that the presumption in foreign sales is that no US patent rights are exhausted. I purchased my last couple of smart phones through the used market – and have also repaired them several times. Under the law, I probably should have taken steps to ensure that all of the original equipment manufacturers affirmatively granted repair and resale rights. Coming together, the Federal Circuit's approach here has the potential to limit the market for the repair and reselling of goods. I would suggest that those activities are incredibly beneficial to our society in terms of resource allocation and avoiding waste as well as empowering citizens and avoiding anticompetitive market behavior.

== Notes and references ==
=== References ===
The citations in this article are written in Bluebook style. Please see the talk page for more information.
