= Grey market =

Commodity trade outside of original producer's distribution channel

A grey market or dark market (sometimes confused with the similar term "parallel market") is the trade of a commodity through distribution channels that are not authorised by the original manufacturer or trademark proprietor. Grey market products (grey goods) are products traded outside the manufacturer's authorised channel.

== Etymology ==
Manufacturers of computers, telecommunications, and technology equipment often sell these products through distributors. Most distribution agreements require the distributor to resell the products strictly to end users. However, some distributors choose to resell products to other resellers. In the late 1980s, manufacturers labelled the resold products as the "grey market".

== Description ==
Grey market goods are goods sold outside the authorized distribution channels by entities which may have no relationship with the producer of the goods. This form of parallel import frequently occurs when the price of an item is significantly higher in one country than another. This commonly takes place with electronic equipment such as cameras. An entity will buy the product where it is available cheaply, often at retail but sometimes at wholesale, and import it to the target market. They then sell it at a price high enough to provide a profit but below the normal market price.

International efforts to promote free trade, including reduced tariffs and harmonised national standards, facilitate this form of arbitrage whenever manufacturers attempt to preserve highly disparate pricing. Because of the nature of grey markets, it is difficult or impossible to track the precise numbers of grey market sales. Grey market goods are often new, but some grey market goods are used goods.

The two main types of grey markets are those of imported manufactured goods that would normally be unavailable or more expensive in a certain country and unissued securities that are not yet traded in official markets. Sometimes the term dark market is used to describe secretive, unregulated trading in commodity futures, notably crude oil in 2008. This can be considered a third type of "grey market" not intended or explicitly authorised by oil producers.

The import of legally restricted or prohibited items such as prescription drugs or firearms, on the other hand, is considered black market, as is the smuggling of goods into a target country to avoid import duties. A related concept is bootlegging; the smuggling or transport of highly regulated goods, especially alcoholic beverages. The term "bootlegging" is also often applied to the production or distribution of counterfeit or otherwise infringing goods (also black market).

Grey markets sometimes develop for video game consoles and titles whose demand temporarily exceeds their supply causing authorised local suppliers to run out of stock. This happens especially during the Christmas and holiday season. Other popular items, such as dolls, magnets and contraception, can also be affected. In such situations, the grey market price may be considerably higher than the manufacturer's suggested retail price, with unscrupulous sellers buying items in bulk for the express purpose of inflating the prices during resale, a practice called scalping.

== Goods ==
=== Arcade games ===
Certain otherwise identical arcade games are marketed under different titles, such as Carrier Air Wing/U.S. Navy, Mega Man/Rockman, and Police 911/Police 24/7. When certain arcade games are first powered on, a warning message is shown such as "[t]his game is intended only for sale and use in (country/region)" and often, such a message is occasionally displayed while the machine is in an attract mode.

One reason for these regional name variants is trademark issues. A company may not own the rights to a trademark in another country, where that trademark may be owned by an entirely different entity. Because of this, a different name must be used.

These regional name variations may also be used to prevent the sale of bootleg arcade games, including those from Japanese versions.

=== Automobiles ===
Automobile manufacturers segment world markets by territory and price, thus creating a demand for grey import vehicles.

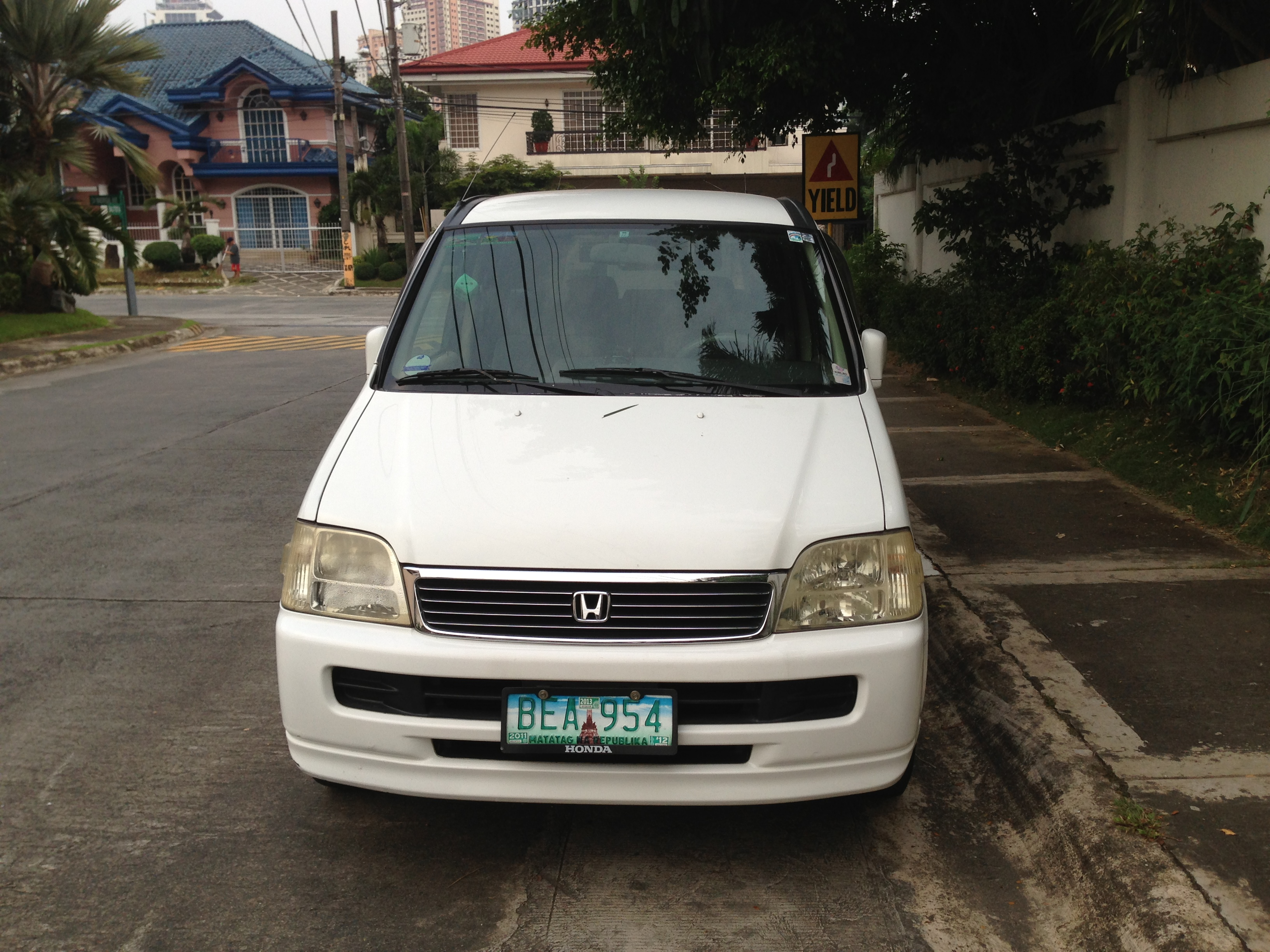
A Honda Stepwgn as seen in the Philippines, converted to left-hand drive. Right-hand drive vehicles are not allowed to be used in the country except in freeport zones, and are thus modified to be driven legally.

Although some grey imports are a bargain, some buyers have discovered that their vehicles do not meet local regulations, or that parts and services are difficult to obtain because these cars are different from the versions sold through the new car dealer network.

Many used cars come from Singapore or Japan, and are sold in other countries around the world, including the United Kingdom, Russia and New Zealand. Japan and Singapore both have strict laws against older cars. The Japanese Shaken roadworthiness testing regime requires progressively more expensive maintenance, involving the replacement of entire vehicle systems, that are unnecessary for safety, year on year, to devalue older cars and promote new cars on their home market that were available for low prices. This makes these well running cars seem reasonably priced, even after transport expenses. There are very few cars in Japan more than five years old.

New car arbitrage has become an issue in the US as well, especially when the US price is lower in the US than in countries like China.

Beyond cost issues, grey market cars provide consumer access to models never officially released. Before 1987, the Range Rover, Mercedes-Benz G-Class, and Lamborghini Countach, all revolutionary designs, were grey import vehicles in the United States. The grey market provided a clear signal to these manufacturers that the United States had significant demand for these cars, and their present-day US model descendants remain popular. Years later, Nissan similarly decided to sell the GT-R in North America after seeing how many people were importing older Skylines. Although Mercedes-Benz was also a beneficiary of the signals to US consumer demand that the grey market provided, their lobbying in Washington succeeded in virtually ending the US grey market in 1988.

In the UK, some Japanese domestic market models fetch a high price because of their performance, novelty or status, assisted by the fact that the Japanese drive on the left, in common with the UK, so vehicles are right hand drive. Popular types include off-road vehicles, people carriers, affordable sports cars like the Mazda MX-5 / Roadster, very high performance sports cars including the rally homologation based cars like the Subaru Impreza and Mitsubishi Lancer Evolution, ultra-compact kei cars, and limited edition Japanese market designer cars like the Nissan Figaro.

In Japan, due to strict and differing car classifications and emission regulations, or lack of main consumer demand, some international models or certain regional models are not sold in Japanese domestic market. Grey importers are trying to import some of these models into Japan but it is permitted due to lack of restrictions imposed on them, unlike in other countries. Among the grey-imported vehicles in Japan are pickup trucks like Toyota Tundra, Nissan Navara and Subaru BRAT, which are not officially sold in Japan.

=== Broadcasting ===
In television and radio broadcasting, grey markets primarily exist in relation to satellite radio and satellite television delivery. The most common form is companies reselling the equipment and services of a provider not licensed to operate in the market. For instance, a Canadian consumer who wants access to American television and radio services that are not available in Canada may approach a grey market reseller of Dish Network or DirecTV. There is also a grey market in the United States (especially from Canadian citizens with winter homes in the U.S.) for Canadian satellite services such as Bell Satellite TV or Shaw Direct.

VPN services also market access to programming restricted by broadcasting deals through spoofing an IP address within a different territory. This is commonly used to access a television series otherwise stuck on an unpopular streaming service and instead access it easier through a service such as Netflix, which may have it in their library within another territory.

In Europe, some satellite TV services are encrypted since they have only been authorised by content suppliers to broadcast films, sporting events and US entertainment programming in a certain country or countries. For example, only residents of the UK and Ireland may subscribe to Sky Digital. In other European countries with large British expatriate populations, such as Spain, Sky is widely available through the grey market. Although Sky discourages the use of its viewing cards outside the UK or Ireland, and has the technology to render them invalid, many people continue to use them.

Parallel importing of "free-to-view" Sky cards from the UK to Ireland is often done so that Irish Sky customers can receive Channel 5 and some of the other channels not generally available via Sky in Ireland because of trademark and other licensing issues. Conversely, Sky viewing cards from Ireland, which allow viewing of Irish terrestrial channels, are imported into the UK. Northern Ireland residents subscribing to Sky can watch RTÉ One and Two and TG4, although not TV3, which carries many of the same programmes as ITV, a lot of the programmes airing before ITV can show them.

It is also becoming increasingly common in the UK for some pubs to use satellite decoder cards from Greece, Norway, Poland or the Arab world to receive satellite TV broadcasting live English football matches from those countries. Alternatively, they may use cards which allow pirate decryption of scrambled signals. Such cards are typically much cheaper than the cards available in the UK from Sky (who charge extra fees for public showing licences). However, Sky has taken civil and criminal action against some who do this. Two cases involving grey cards, originating in 2008 were referred to the European Court of Justice. The suppliers of grey cards and Karen Murphy, the landlady of a pub which showed Premier League matches using a Greek decoder card, won their cases at the European Court of Justice. The judges ruled that right holders cannot license their content on an exclusive territorial basis, as this breaches EU law on competition and free movement of goods and services. However, whilst this ruling allows domestic viewers to subscribe to foreign satellite services, pubs may still need permission from rights holders such as the Premier League to broadcast content. This is because certain elements of the broadcast such as branding are copyrighted.

There followed two High Court judgements on this matter. Mr Justice Kitchin ruled that QC Leisure and other suppliers of foreign satellite systems could carry on with their businesses if they could prevent copyright elements such as branding of football matches from being shown in a public place. The Premier League could pursue prosecutions of licensees who showed branding of matches via foreign satellite systems. Karen Murphy won her case in the High Court following the ruling from the European Court of Justice. The ruling from Justice Stanley Burnton allowed Ms Murphy to shop for the cheapest foreign satellite provider. However, the ruling from Justice Kitchin prevented Ms Murphy from showing matches in her pub via foreign satellite systems because branding is subject to trade mark law. It is no longer illegal though for a customer to purchase a foreign viewing card from an EU country and use it outside the territory.

=== Cannabis in the United States ===
Unlike other countries that have legalized recreational cannabis, federal law in the United States still prohibits possessing, transporting, or selling cannabis, while many states have legalized it at the state level. These contradictory laws have led to an unusual situation where a person may purchase cannabis at a legal dispensary, but may face charges if they take it into another state where it has not been legalized or attempt to take it on an airplane.

=== Cell phones ===
The emergence of the GSM international standard for cell phones in 1990 prompted the beginning of the grey market in the cell phone industry. As global demand for mobile phones grew, so did the size of the parallel market. Today, it is estimated that over 30% of all mobile phones traded will pass through the grey market and that statistic continues to grow. It is impossible to quantify an exact figure, but sources suggest that as many as 500,000 mobile phones are bought and sold outside official distribution channels through their trading platforms every day. Many smaller countries and markets (Croatia, for example) are still prone to grey imports of mobile phones, apparently due to very limited number of mobile phone models ever to be sold in that particular country.

The driving forces behind a heavily active mobile phone grey market include currency fluctuations, customers demands, manufacturers policies, market-specific features, and price variations. It is not uncommon for grey market traders to introduce a product into a market months in advance of the official launch. This was evident with the launch of the iPhone 4, where international grey market traders bought large quantities at Apple's retail price then shipped to countries where the product was not available, adding a substantial margin to the resale price. The launch of the iPhone 14, which removed the SIM card slot in the United States and was replaced with eSIM technology, but remains elsewhere, including Canada, also created a grey market for a version with a traditional SIM card slot.

=== Computer software ===
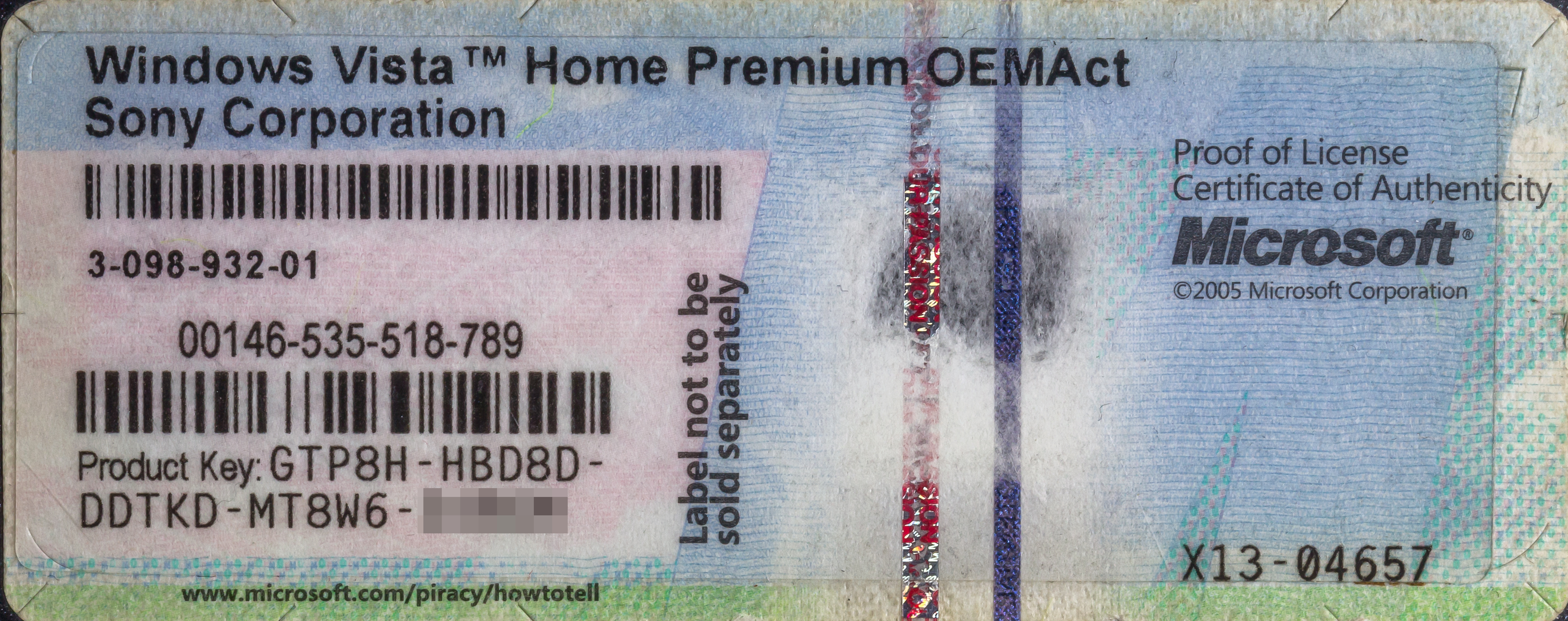
Product key on a Proof of License Certificate of Authenticity for Windows Vista Home Premium

Purchasing some games from online content distribution systems, such as Valve's Steam, simply requires entering a valid CD key to associate with an account. In 2007, after the release of The Orange Box, Valve deactivated accounts with CD keys that were purchased outside the consumer's territory in order to maintain the integrity of region-specific licensing. This generated complaints from North American customers who had circumvented their Steam end-user licence agreement by purchasing The Orange Box through cheaper, market retailers.

Due to regional lockout, video game consoles and their games are often subjected to grey market trade and are chosen as the alternative to modding by some gamers. The reasons for this may range from the console being crippled in some markets to that of the desired game not being released for the market the potential consumer of the game is in.

PC code stripping is a process by which boxed PC product is bought in large quantities at cheap rates. Manual labor is then used to open the box, retrieve the activation code from the box and enter the code into a database. The activation code is then sold online as a download key and the physical product is discarded or sold as backup media.

=== Electronics ===
There is a grey market in electronics in which retailers import merchandise from regions where the prices are cheaper or where regional design differences are more favourable to consumers, and subsequently sell merchandise in regions where the manufacturer's selling price is more expensive. Online retailers are often able to exploit pricing disparities in various countries by using grey-market imports from regions where the product is sold at lower costs and reselling them without regional buyer restrictions. Websites such as Taobao and eBay enable customers to buy products designed for foreign regions with different features or at cheaper costs, using parallel importation.

The grey market for photographic equipment and other such electronics is thriving in heavily taxed states like Singapore with dealers importing directly from lower taxed states and selling at lower prices, creating competition against local distributors recognised by the products' manufacturers. "Grey sets", as colloquially called, are often comparable to products purchased from the manufacturer's preferred retailer. Lenses or flash units of parallel imports often only differ by the warranty provided, and since the grey sets were manufactured for another state, photographic equipment manufacturers often offer local warranty, instead of international warranty, which will render grey sets ineligible for warranty claims with the manufacturer.

Because of the nature of local warranties, importers of grey sets usually offer their own warranty schemes to compensate for the manufacturers' refusal of service. Grey sets do not differ particularly from official imports. They look and function identically. In the early days of camera sales during the 1960s and 70s, when lenses had amber coating, the bargain basements for Japanese equipment were Hong Kong and Singapore, through which goods were channeled to European shop windows bypassing the often substantial levy of the official importers. World-market pricing and the Internet have largely eliminated this. Canon gives their hard-selling DSLR cameras names like "Rebel" in the US and "EOS xx0/xx00" outside it, aimed at preventing the competitively priced US-merchandise reaching Europe where sales are slower but achieve a higher profit.

=== Frequent-flyer miles ===
Trade or bartering of frequent-flyer miles is prohibited by nearly all major airlines, although an authorised medium exists for specific frequent flyer programs. Unauthorised exchanges of frequent flyer miles – of which several exist – are also major examples of grey markets.

=== Infant formula ===
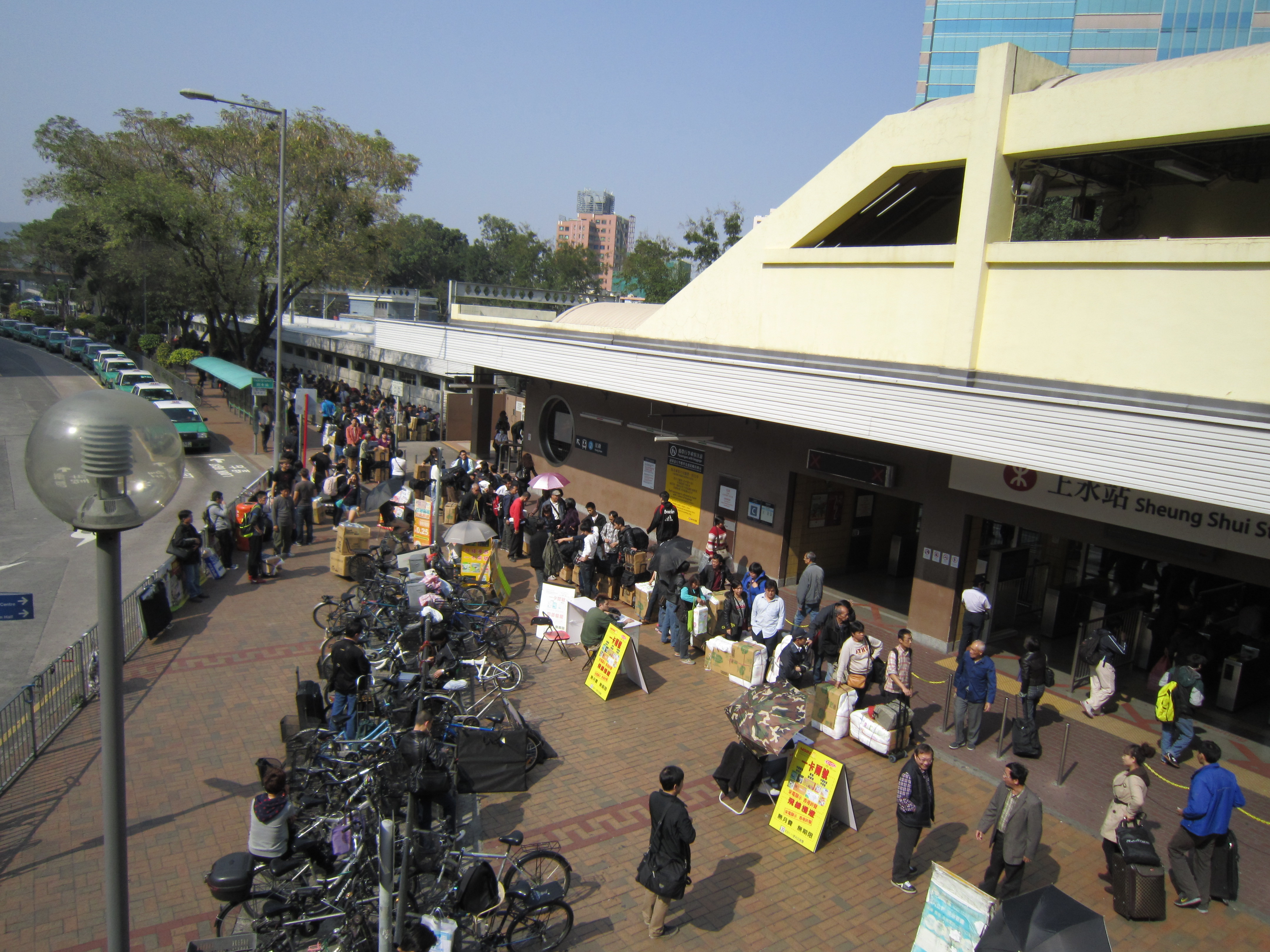
Milk-powder runners queuing outside Sheung Shui station, near the Hong Kong border

Following the 2008 Chinese milk scandal, parents in China lost confidence in locally produced infant formula, creating a demand for European, Japanese and American produced formula. Import restrictions on formula from these sources has led to parents willing to pay a premium for foreign brands leading to the emergence of milk-powder runners, who buy formula at ticket price over the counter in Hong Kong, carry the tins over the border to Shenzhen before returning to Hong Kong to repeat the process. The effect of the runners led to a shortage of infant formula in Hong Kong forcing the government to impose an export restriction of two tins per person per trip. The Chinese then turned to Australia, subsequently also causing shortages there and for milk formula producers to ask retailers in the United Kingdom to restrict purchasers to two tins, as there was evidence that milk formula is being purchased for onward shipment to China.

=== Pharmaceuticals ===
Some prescription medications, most notably popular and branded drugs, can have very high prices in comparison to their cost of transport. In addition, pharmaceutical prices can vary significantly between countries, particularly as a result of government intervention in prices. As a consequence, the grey market for pharmaceuticals flourishes, particularly in Europe and along the US–Canada border where Canadians often pay significantly lower prices for US-made pharmaceuticals than Americans do.

A related concept is off-label use. Drugs are generally authorized for particular uses, but such authorization generally only prohibits the manufacturer from marketing them for other uses; physicians may be permitted to prescribe them for unauthorized, "off-label" uses.

=== Securities ===
Public company securities that are not listed, traded or quoted on any U.S. stock exchange or the OTC markets are sometimes purchased or sold over the counter (OTC) via the grey market. Grey market securities have no market makers quoting the stock. Since grey market securities are not traded or quoted on an exchange or interdealer quotation system, investor's bids and offers are not collected in a central spot so market transparency is diminished and effective execution of orders is difficult.

In India, the unofficial grey market trades are prevalent for the initial public offering (IPOs). The people put their money in the unregulated and unofficial grey market before the listing of the IPOs. The promoters of the company, along with the market operators, buy and sell the shares before the listing. This is the easiest way to manipulate the share price before IPO listing.

=== Sneakers ===
One of the biggest grey market marketplaces for sneakers is StockX. Since November 2020, it has also opened up to electronic products with a valuation of almost four billion.

StockX has planned to go public since October 2019. As of January 2022, they had not yet done so.

=== Swiss watches ===
The Financial Times stated that in 2022 there was market of over a billion dollars for grey market Swiss watches such as Rolex, Breitling, IWC, Cartier, Patek Philippe, Audemars Piguet, Breguet and Bulgari.

Barron's has said that in 2017 fine Swiss watches were available for up to 40% lower prices from the grey market. The New York Times even criticized the Rolex Daytona calling it "the hottest watch that money can't buy".

=== Textbooks ===
College-level textbooks have a grey market, with publishers offering them for lower prices in developing countries or sometimes the UK.

These books typically contain a disclaimer stating that importation is not permitted. However, the U.S. Supreme Court decisions Quality King v. L'anza (1998) and especially Kirtsaeng v. John Wiley & Sons, Inc. (2013, involving textbooks imported from Thailand by an eBay seller) protect the importation of lawfully produced copyrighted materials under the first-sale doctrine.

== Corporate action ==
The parties most opposed to the grey market are usually the authorised agents or importers, or the retailers of the item in the target market. Often this is the national subsidiary of the manufacturer, or a related company. In response to the resultant damage to their profits and reputation, manufacturers and their official distribution chain will often seek to restrict the grey market. Such responses can breach competition law, particularly in the European Union. Manufacturers or their licensees often seek to enforce trademark or other intellectual-property laws against the grey market. Such rights may be exercised against the import, sale and/or advertisement of grey imports. In 2002, Levi Strauss, after a 4-year legal case, prevented the UK supermarket Tesco from selling grey market jeans. However, such rights can be limited. Examples of such limitations include the first-sale doctrine in the United States and the doctrine of the exhaustion of rights in the European Union.

When grey-market products are advertised on Google, eBay or other legitimate web sites, it is possible to petition for removal of any advertisements that violate trademark or copyright laws. This can be done directly, without the involvement of legal professionals. For example, eBay will remove listings of such products even in countries where their purchase and use is not against the law. Manufacturers may refuse to supply distributors and retailers (and with commercial products, customers) that trade in grey market goods. They may also more broadly limit supplies in markets where prices are low. Manufacturers may refuse to honor the warranty of an item purchased from grey market sources, on the grounds that the higher price on the non-grey market reflects a higher level of service even though the manufacturer does of course control their own prices to distributors. Alternatively, they may provide the warranty service only from the manufacturer's subsidiary in the intended country of import, not the diverted third country where the grey-market goods are ultimately sold by the distributor or retailer. This response to the grey market is especially evident in electronics goods. Local laws (or customer demand) concerning distribution and packaging (for example, the language on labels, units of measurement, and nutritional disclosure on foodstuffs) can be brought into play, as can national standards certifications for certain goods.

Manufacturers may give the same item different model numbers in different countries, even though the functions of the item are identical, so that they can identify grey imports. Manufacturers can also use supplier codes to enable similar tracing of grey imports. Parallel market importers often decode the product in order to avoid the identification of the supplier. In the United States, courts have ruled decoding is legal, however manufacturers and brand owners may have rights if they can prove that the decoding has materially altered the product where certain trademarks have been defaced or the decoding has removed the ability of the manufacturer from enforcing quality-control measures. For example, if the decoding defaces the logo of the product or brand or if the batch code is removed preventing the manufacturer from re-calling defective batches.

The development of DVD region codes, and equivalent regional-lockout techniques in other media, are examples of technological features designed to limit the flow of goods between national markets, effectively fighting the grey market that would otherwise develop. This enables movie studios and other content creators to charge more for the same product in one market than in another, or alternatively withhold the product from some markets for a particular time.

=== Canon ===
The lawsuits started by Canon U.S.A. Inc. against a number of retailers on 25 October 2015 in the New York Eastern District Court (Case No. 2:15-cv-6019 and No. 2:15-cv-6015) will not be tried until 2016 at the earliest, but are based on a trademark violation. The plaintiff alleges that the defendant retailers applied counterfeit serial numbers to Canon digital SLR cameras and sold kits with inferior (non-Canon) warranties as well as counterfeit batteries and chargers that did not comply with U.S. certification regulations. Canon U.S.A. Inc. also reserves the right to claim damages for "further violations of CUSA's intellectual property and other rights [that] will come to light as this litigation progresses".

=== Alliance for Gray Market and Counterfeit Abatement ===
The Alliance for Gray Market and Counterfeit Abatement (AGMA) is a California-based non-profit organisation of information technology (IT) companies that works to educate and raise awareness on counterfeiting; digital IP protection; service and warranty abuse; and the grey market.

== Support ==
Consumer advocacy groups argue that discrimination against consumers—the charging of higher prices on the same object simply because of where they happen to live—is unjust and monopolistic behaviour on the part of corporations towards the public. Since it requires governments to legislate to prevent their citizens from purchasing goods at cheaper prices from other markets, and because this is clearly not in their citizens' interests, many governments in democratic countries have chosen not to protect anti-competitive technologies such as DVD region-coding.

Correspondingly, the grey market has found support from most ideological tendencies. Anarchist opponents of class discrimination argue that private property in general leads to the oppression of much of society and are therefore against the very idea of intellectual property, which forms the basis of arguments against the grey market. Proponents of the corporate financial system, in agreement, assert that the enforcement of intellectual property can lead to a 'lessening of composing effort'.

The grey market has been a constant source of litigation and appeals in the United States. The same fundamental question arises under patent law and copyright law, namely whether or not a good sold abroad lawfully is still protected by United States intellectual property law for the purposes of resale. When purchased domestically, a copyrighted good may be resold by the purchaser under the first-sale doctrine contained at 17 U.S.C. § 109(c). Similarly, a patented good may be re-sold under the patent exhaustion doctrine. In 2013, the United States Supreme Court largely discussed the legality of the grey market when it decided Kirtsaeng v. John Wiley & Sons, Inc. where it held that a sale abroad of a copyrighted good triggers the first sale doctrine. The decision is largely understood to apply to patented goods as well.

== See also ==
- Agorism
- Pirate Party
- Counter-economics
- Cryptocurrency
- Hawala
- Regional lockout
- The Misfit Economy – a 2015 book
- Black market
- Red Market (organ trade)
- Parallel import
- Silk Road (marketplace)
