= Absorption (economics) =

In economics, absorption is the total demand for all final marketed goods and services by all economic agents resident in an economy, regardless of the origin of the goods and services themselves. As the absorption is equal to the sum of all domestically produced goods consumed locally and all imports, it is equal to national income [Y = C + I + G + (X - M)] minus the balance of trade [X - M].

The term was coined, and its relation to the balance of trade identified, by Sidney Alexander in 1952.

The term "absorption" is often used in real estate to assess demand for leasing space.
