= Quality King Distributors, Inc. v. L'anza Research International, Inc. =

- Supreme Court of the United States

Argued December 8, 1997 Decided March 9, 1998
- Full case name: Quality King Distributors, Inc., Petitioner v. L'anza Research International, Inc.
- Citations: 523 U.S. 135 (more) 118 S. Ct. 1125; 140 L. Ed. 2d 254; 1998 U.S. LEXIS 1606; 66 U.S.L.W. 4188; 45 U.S.P.Q.2d (BNA) 1961; Copy. L. Rep. (CCH) ¶ 27,750; 26 Media L. Rep. 1385; 98 Cal. Daily Op. Service 1651; 98 Daily Journal DAR 2291; 1998 Colo. J. C.A.R. 1216; 11 Fla. L. Weekly Fed. S 383

Case history
- Prior: On writ of certiorari to the United States Court of Appeals for the Ninth Circuit

Holding
- The copyright holder could not prevent re-importation of materials it had authorized.

Court membership
- Chief Justice William Rehnquist Associate Justices John P. Stevens · Sandra Day O'Connor; Antonin Scalia · Anthony Kennedy; David Souter · Clarence Thomas; Ruth Bader Ginsburg · Stephen Breyer

Case opinions
- Majority: Stevens, joined by unanimous
- Concurrence: Ginsburg

Quality King Distributors, Inc. v. L'anza Research International, Inc., 523 U.S. 135 (1998), was a decision by the United States Supreme Court over whether a copyright holder could restrict redistribution of material containing copyrighted content (authorized by the copyright holder) which is imported into the United States as so-called "grey market" goods.

== Opinion of the Court ==
The Supreme Court found that the copyright holder could not prevent re-importation of the products it had authorized for export from the United States.

This case did not address the importation of products made outside the United States under authority of the copyright holder. The Court addressed that issue in Kirtsaeng v. John Wiley & Sons, Inc., 568 U.S. 519 (2013), holding that those sales were also qualifying "first sales", and that copyright holders could not restrict trafficking of those works after those sales.

== See also ==
- First-sale doctrine
- List of United States Supreme Court cases, volume 523
- List of United States Supreme Court cases
- Lists of United States Supreme Court cases by volume
