= Sidney S. Alexander =

American economist

Sidney Stuart Alexander (May 3, 1916 – February 19, 2005) was an American economist who was associated with the Massachusetts Institute of Technology.

Alexander graduated summa cum laude from Harvard College in 1936. Continuing at Harvard University, he received a master's degree in 1938 and a doctorate in 1946.

Robert M Solow lists him among his teachers saying "The Harvard of my time taught statistics scandalously badly. I would hardly have known what I was missing if Sidney Alexander, filling in for a couple of weeks as lecturer in the graduate course in economic statistics, had not lifted the curtain and let the class peek at the real thing".

During World War II, Alexander served as a director of research in the Office of Strategic Services (OSS).

From 1956 until his retirement, Alexander taught at MIT, in both the MIT Sloan School of Management and the Economics Department.
