= Importation right =

Right to import a product to a given country

An importation right is the legal ability to import a product into a certain country.

Importation means "sending goods from one country to another". Right means "in accord with law...."

== See also ==
- Import duty
- Most favored nation
