= Motion Picture Patents Co. v. Universal Film Manufacturing Co. =

- Supreme Court of the United States

Argued January 12, 15, 1917 Decided April 9, 1917
- Full case name: Motion Picture Patents Company v. Universal Film Manufacturing Company, et al.
- Citations: 243 U.S. 502 (more) 37 S. Ct. 416; 61 L. Ed. 871; 1917 U.S. LEXIS 2017

Court membership
- Chief Justice Edward D. White Associate Justices Joseph McKenna · Oliver W. Holmes Jr. William R. Day · Willis Van Devanter; Mahlon Pitney · James C. McReynolds; Louis Brandeis · John H. Clarke

Case opinions
- Majority: Clarke, joined by White, Day, Pitney, Brandeis
- Concurrence: McReynolds (in result)
- Dissent: Holmes, joined by McKenna, Van Devanter
- This case overturned a previous ruling or rulings
- Henry v. A.B. Dick Co.

Motion Picture Patents Co. v. Universal Film Mfg. Co., 243 U.S. 502 (1917), is United States Supreme Court decision that is notable as an early example of the patent misuse doctrine. It held that, because a patent grant is limited to the invention described in the claims of the patent, the patent law does not empower the patent owner, by notices attached to the patented article, to extend the scope of the patent monopoly by restricting the use of the patented article to materials necessary for their operation but forming no part of the patented invention, or to place downstream restrictions on the articles making them subject to conditions as to use. The decision overruled Henry v. A.B. Dick Co., which had held such restrictive notices effective and enforceable.

== Background ==
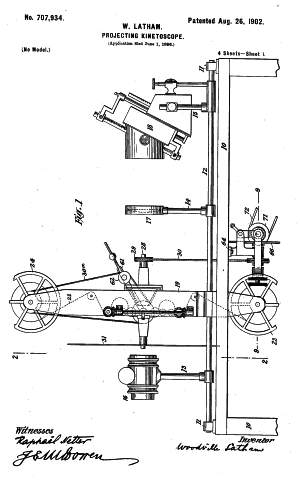
Diagram of patented device involved in MPP case

The Motion Picture Patents Company (MPP) was the assignee of a number of patents covering motion picture projectors, including US Pat. No. 707,934, on a part of the mechanism used in motion picture Projectors to feed a film through the machine with a regular, uniform, and accurate movement. MPP granted to the Precision Machine Company (PMC) a license to manufacture and sell machines embodying the patented invention. The license provided that every machine PMC sold must be sold subject to a restriction and condition that the machine "shall be used solely for exhibiting or projecting motion pictures" embodying "the inventions of reissued letters patent No. 12,192" and leased by a licensee of [MPP]." The license also provided that the machine must have a plate attached to it stating, "The sale and purchase of this machine gives only the right to use it solely with moving pictures" embodying "the inventions of reissued letters patent No. 12,192" and leased by a licensee of [MPP]."

PMC made and sold one of the patented machines to the owner of the Seventy-Second Street Playhouse (a movie house on 72nd Street in New York City), with a plate containing the required notice. Prague Amusement Company (Prague) then leased the Seventy-Second Street Playhouse, and acquired the machine in question as a part of the equipment of the leased playhouse. Also, at that time, the Universal Film Manufacturing Company (now known as Universal Pictures) made two films that were supplied to Prague for use on the machine. Prague used the machine to exhibit the films.

MPP sent letters protesting the alleged infringement of its patent, and then sued Universal, Prague, and the owner of the movie house. It was established at trial that 40,000 of the MPP machines are now in use in the US, and that the patented mechanism is the only one with which motion picture films can be used successfully. The district court held that the post-sale limitation on the use of the machine attempted to be made by the notice attached to it was invalid, and that the purchaser and its lessee had an implied license to use the machine as it had been used. The district court dismissed the case and the Second Circuit affirmed the district court.

== Ruling of Supreme Court ==
The Supreme Court, in an opinion written by Justice Clarke affirmed the judgment. Justice Holmes, joined by Justices McKenna and Van Devanter, dissented.

=== Majority opinion ===
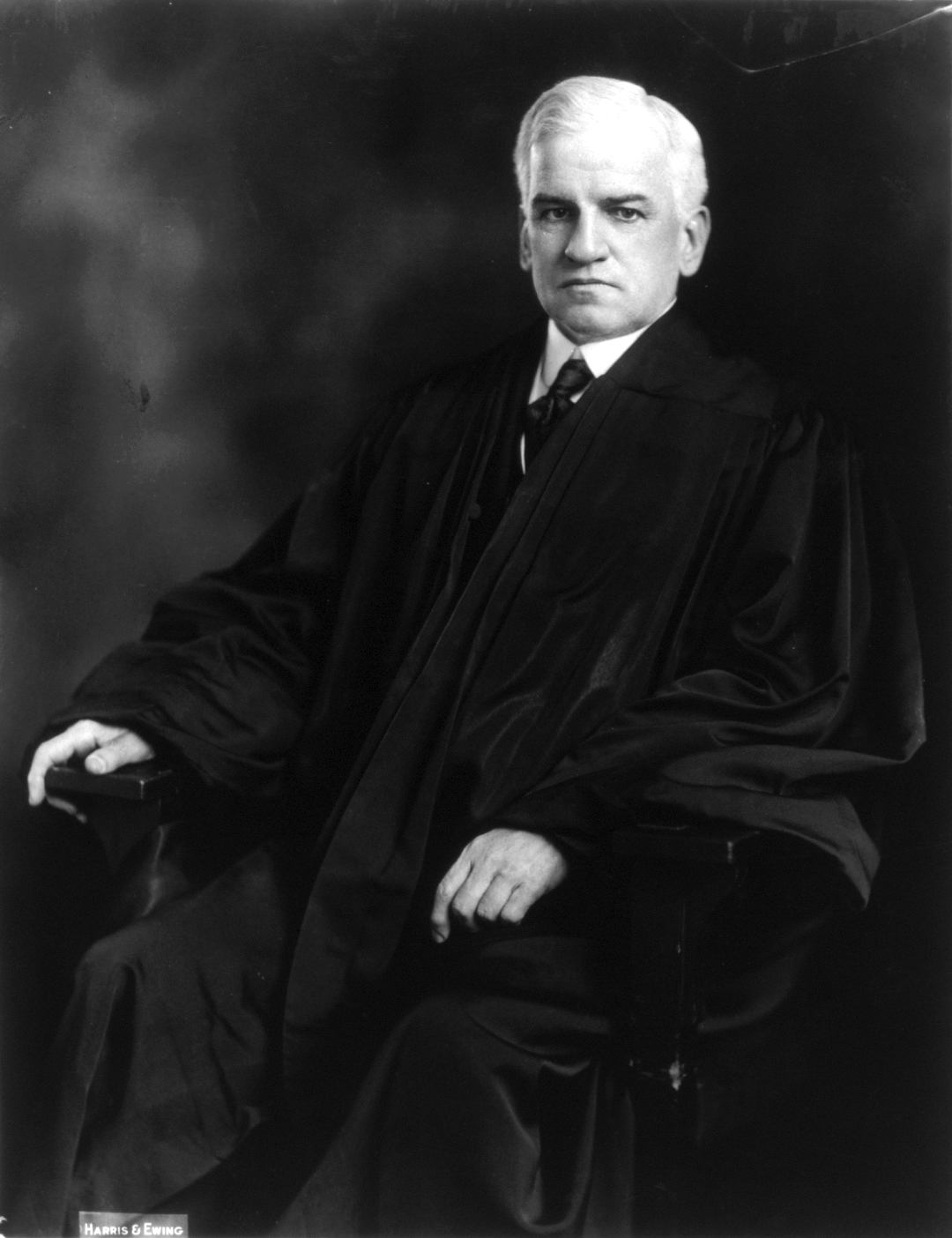
Justice Clarke delivered the opinion of the Court

==== The patent statute ====
Justice Clarke began his analysis by observing that the patent statute does not provide for and thus authorize notices of the type involved here. Therefore, "whatever validity it [the notice] has must be derived from the general, and not from the patent, law." The statute gives the patentee the exclusive right to make, sell, and use the patented article. In interpreting the statute, three important rules have been declared by the Court:

1. "The scope of every patent is limited to the invention described in the claims." The patentee "can claim nothing beyond them."
2. The statute gives the patentee nothing but the power "to restrain others from manufacturing, using, or selling that which he has invented."
3. "Since Pennock v. Dialogue, 2 Pet. 1, was decided in 1829, this Court has consistently held that the primary purpose of our patent laws is not the creation of private fortunes for the owners of patents, but is 'to promote the progress of science and the useful arts.' "

Accordingly:

These rules of law make it very clear that the scope of the grant which may be made to an inventor in a patent, pursuant to the statute, must be limited to the invention described in the claims of his patent, and, to determine what grant may lawfully be so made, we must hold fast to the language of the act of Congress providing for it.

This patent is only on the film projector mechanism described and claimed in the patent, the Court said. By the same token:

It is not concerned with, and has nothing to do with, the materials with which or on which the machine operates. The grant is of the exclusive right to use the mechanism to produce the result with any appropriate material, and the materials with which the machine is operated are no part of the patented machine or of the combination which produces the patented result. The difference is clear and vital between the exclusive right to use the machine, which the law gives to the inventor, and the right to use it exclusively with prescribed materials to which such a license notice as we have here seeks to restrict it.

==== The rise of the inherency doctrine ====
Until recently, the Court said, this plain meaning of the statute was generally understood as the law. But with the growth of corporations the idea had arisen "of gathering great profits in small payments, which are not realized or resented, from many, rather than smaller or even equal profits in larger payments" and so patentees have come to seek to assert "the right to restrict the use of [patented machinery] to materials or supplies not described in the patent, and not, by its terms, made a part of the thing patented." A majority of the Supreme Court had accepted that principle several years earlier in Henry v. A.B. Dick Co.

The Court traced the evolution of this idea and explained why a majority of the Court rejected it:

The construction of the patent law which justifies as valid the restriction of patented machines, by notice, to use with unpatented supplies necessary in the operation of them, but which are no part of them, is believed to have originated in Heaton-Peninsular Button-Fastener Co. v. Eureka Specialty Co. (which has come to be widely referred to as the Button-Fastener Case), decided by . . . the Sixth Circuit in 1896.

. . . This decision [Button-Fastener] proceeds upon the argument that, since the patentee may withhold his patent altogether from public use, he must logically and necessarily be permitted to impose any conditions which he chooses upon any use which he may allow of it. The defect in this thinking springs from the substituting of inference and argument for the language of the statute, and from failure to distinguish between the rights which are given to the inventor by the patent law and which he may assert against all the world through an infringement proceeding, and rights which he may create for himself by private contract which, however, are subject to the rules of general as distinguished from those of the patent, law. While it is true that, under the statutes as they were (and now are), a patentee might withhold his patented machine from public use, yet, if he consented to use it himself or through others, . . . he is thereby restricted to the use of the invention as it is described in the claims of his patent, and not as it may be expanded by limitations as to materials and supplies necessary to the operation of it, imposed by mere notice to the public.

The . . . obvious possibilities for gain in the method which it approved led to an immediate and widespread adoption of the system, in which these restrictions expanded into more and more comprehensive forms until at length the case at bar is reached, with a machine sold and paid for, yet claimed still to be subject not only to restriction as to supplies to be used, but also subject to any restrictions or conditions as to use . . . which the company which authorized its sale may see fit, after the sale, from time to time to impose. The perfect instrument of favoritism and oppression which such a system of doing business, if valid, would put into the control of the owner of such a patent should make courts astute, if need be, to defeat its operation. If these restrictions were sustained, plainly the plaintiff might, for its own profit or that of its favorites, . . . ruin anyone unfortunate enough to be dependent upon its confessedly important improvements for the doing of business.

Justice Clarke denied the legitimacy of this doctrine, because it extended the power of the patent monopoly from the claimed and patented invention—the mechanism described in the patent—to the unpatented supplies used with the mechanism, which were no part of the statutory monopoly:

[F]or the reasons stated in this opinion, we are convinced that the exclusive right granted in every patent must be limited to the invention described in the claims of the patent, and that it is not competent for the owner of a patent, by notice attached to its machine, to in effect extend the scope of its patent monopoly by restricting the use of it to materials necessary in its operation, but which are no part of the patented invention, or to send its machines forth into the channels of trade of the country subject to conditions as to use or royalty to be paid, to be imposed thereafter at the discretion of such patent owner. The patent law furnishes no warrant for such a practice, and the cost, inconvenience, and annoyance to the public which the opposite conclusion would occasion forbid it.

The Court therefore concluded, first, that Henry v. A.B. Dick must be overruled. Second, the notice on the plate affixed to the machine contains an invalid restriction that the machine must be used only with film embodying the invention of the Edison patent that expired in 1914. "[S]uch a film is obviously not any part of the invention of the patent in suit." Therefore, the notice "is an attempt, without statutory warrant, to continue the patent monopoly in this particular character of film after it has expired," and to enforce it "would be to create a monopoly in the manufacture and use of moving picture films wholly outside of the patent in suit and of the patent law as we have interpreted it." This notice restriction is contrary to public policy:

A restriction which would give to the plaintiff such a potential power for evil over an industry which must be recognized as an important element in the amusement life of the nation, under the conclusions we have stated in this opinion, is plainly void because wholly without the scope and purpose of our patent laws, and because, if sustained, it would be gravely injurious to that public interest, which we have seen is more a favorite of the law than is the promotion of private fortunes.

=== Holmes dissent ===
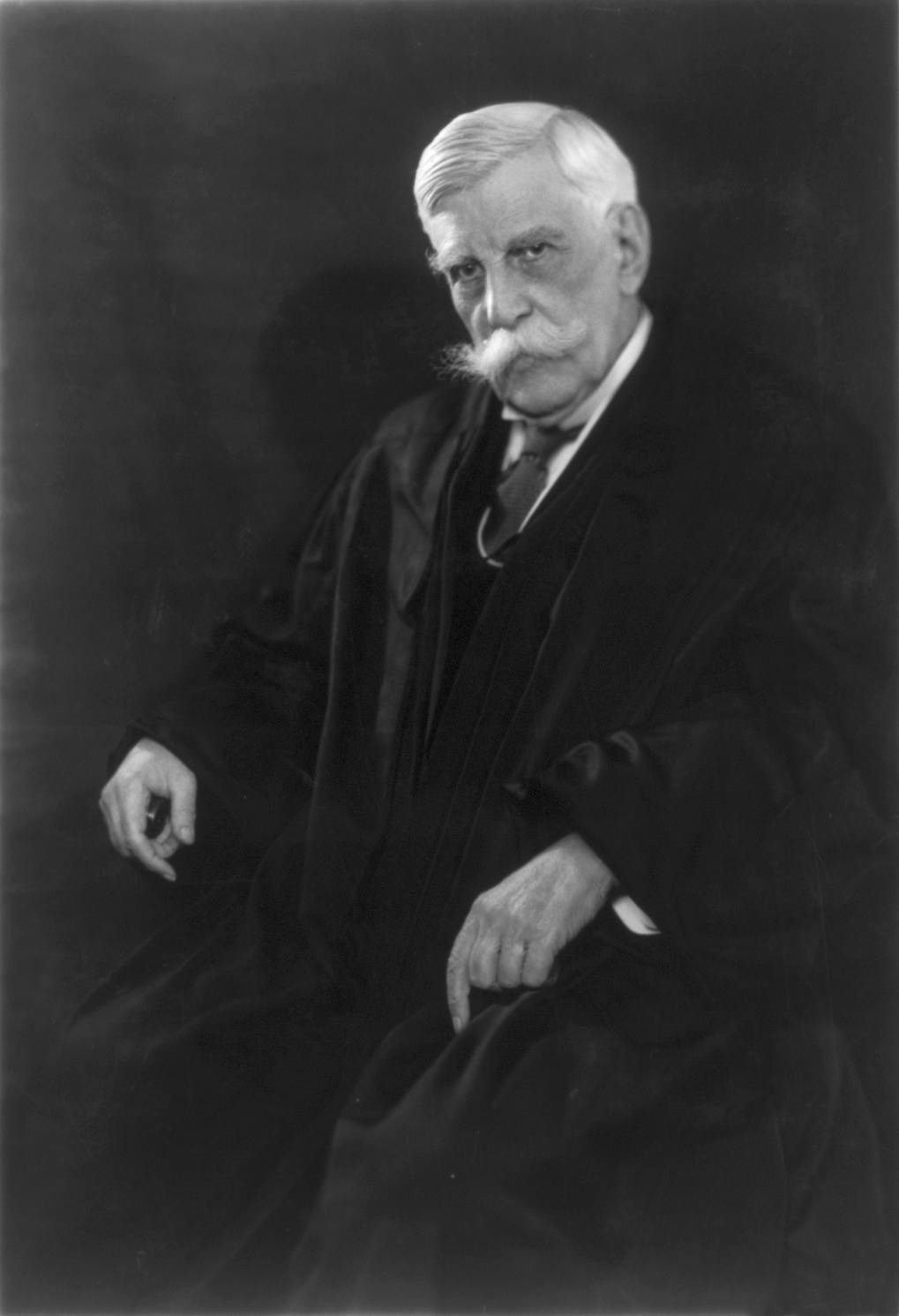
Justice Oliver Wendell Holmes dissented

Justice Holmes had been part of the majority of the Court that endorsed the inherency doctrine in Henry v. A.B. Dick, and he strongly dissented from its rejection and overruling in the Motion Picture Patents case. Justices McKenna and Van Devanter, also in the majority in A.B. Dick, joined the Holmes dissent here. Holmes reasoned that a patentee may keep his invention out of use for the term of the patent, for whatever reason he may choose. "So much being undisputed, I cannot understand why he may not keep it out of use unless the licensee, or, for the matter of that, the buyer, will use some unpatented thing in connection with it." He added, "Non debet, cui plus licet, quod minus est non licere."

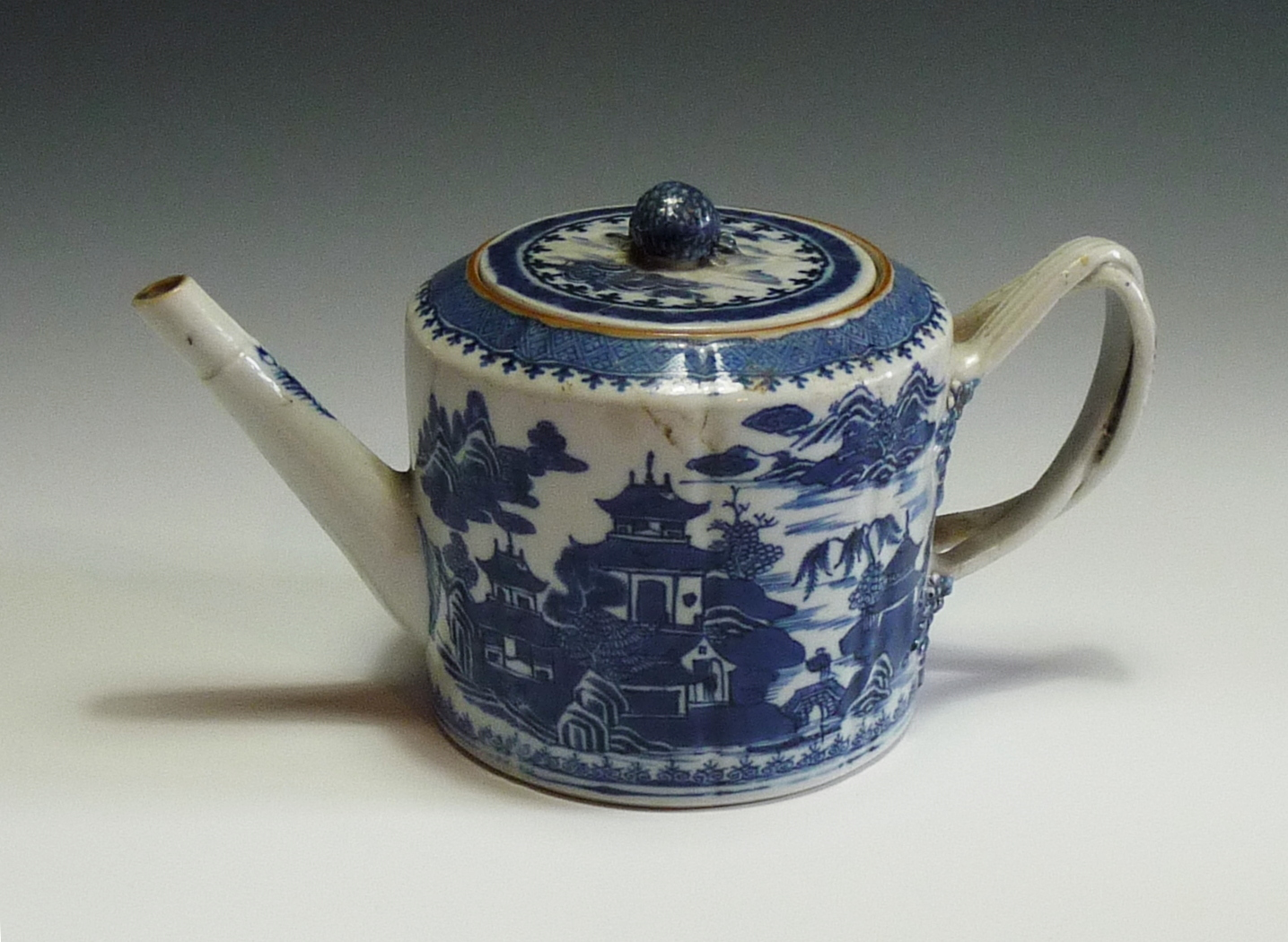
"If the owner prefers to keep the pot unless you will buy his tea, I cannot see, in allowing him the right to do so, anything more than an ordinary incident of ownership."

Holmes did allow, however, "No doubt this principle might be limited or excluded in cases where the condition tends to bring about a state of things that there is a predominant public interest to prevent." But he was quick to add that in his view "there is no predominant public interest to prevent a patented teapot or film feeder from being kept from the public, because, as I have said, the patentee may keep them tied up at will while his patent lasts." He also saw no problem in the alleged extension of the patent monopoly from the claimed mechanism to the films made the condition of use of the mechanism. That effect occurs "only to the extent of the desire for the teapot or film feeder, and if the owner prefers to keep the pot or the feeder unless you will buy his tea or films, I cannot see, in allowing him the right to do so, anything more than an ordinary incident of ownership."

== Subsequent developments ==
The Motion Picture Patents case is often credited with forming the basis for the Supreme Court's creation of an equitable defense of patent misuse to a claim of patent infringement. To the extent, however, that the misuse doctrine (at least when it applies to sold patented articles and restricts purchasers' use of the articles) is an aspect or outgrowth of the exhaustion doctrine, it is preceded by such decisions as Adams v. Burke.

=== Carbice ===
In Carbice Corp. v. American Patents Development Corp., the Supreme Court considered a case in which a patentee, who had a patent on a "package consisting of a protective casing of insulating material having packed therein a quantity of frozen carbon dioxide ["dry ice"] in an insulating container and a quantity of freezable product in freezing proximity to said frozen carbon dioxide," where the frozen carbon dioxide was placed at the center, surrounded by the freezable product, surrounded on the outside by the packaging material. The patentee's exclusive licensee sold dry ice to its customers with an implied license to use the container invention without the payment of royalty, but subject to the condition that the customers use the dry ice only with containers from a designated source and that they use the containers only with dry ice bought from the licensee. Carbice, the defendant in this case, sold dry ice with knowledge that it would be used by the purchasers in packages like those described in the patent. The patentee and exclusive licensee sued Carbice for contributing to infringement by the purchasers of its dry ice. The Supreme Court said:

The relief here sought is indistinguishable from that denied in the Motion Picture Case. There, it was held that to permit the patent owner to "derive its profit not from the invention on which the law gives it a monopoly, but from the unpatented supplies with which it is used" is "wholly without the scope of the patent monopoly." If a monopoly could be so expanded, the owner of a patent for a product might conceivably monopolize the commerce in a large part of unpatented materials used in its manufacture. The owner of a patent for a machine might thereby secure a partial monopoly on the unpatented supplies consumed in its operation. The owner of a patent for a process might secure a partial monopoly on the unpatented material employed in it.

The Court therefore denied relief for the claimed infringement.

=== Leitch v. Barber ===
In Leitch Manufacturing Co. v. Barber Co., the Supreme Court extended the doctrine of the Motion Picture Case case. Barber had a patent on a process for improving the curing of concrete pavement by spreading tar on it to inhibit evaporation (thereby giving the water molecules more time to bond to the concrete and make it harder). Leitch sold tar to a road builder, knowing that it was to be used in accordance with the patented method. Barber sued Leitch for contributory infringement. Barber had exploited his patent by selling tar to road builders with the understanding that they could use the patented method with Barber's tar; it granted no written license.

Barber argued that Carbice did not apply because it granted no license on a condition of tying supplies. The Court said that it had adopted "a method of doing the business which is the practical equivalent of granting a written license with a condition that the patented method may be practiced" only with tar purchased from it." Accordingly, "the sole purpose to which the patent is put is thereby to suppress competition in the production and sale of staple unpatented material for this use in road building." The Court held that the doctrine of the Carbice case applied:

By the rule there declared every use of a patent as a means of obtaining a limited monopoly of unpatented material is prohibited. It applies whether the patent be for a machine, a product, or a process. It applies whatever the nature of the device by which the owner of the patent seeks to effect such unauthorized extension of the monopoly.

=== Morton Salt ===
Morton Salt Co. v. G.S. Suppiger Co., was the first case in which the Court expressly labeled as "misuse" the Motion Picture Patent/Carbice defense to a charge of patent infringement and created the present blanket remedy in infringement cases of unenforceability of the misused patent. Suppiger had a patent on a machine for dispensing salt tablets into food cans in the canning process. It leased the patented machines to canners and required lessee/licensees of its patent to buy their salt tablets used in the machines from its subsidiary. Morton leased machines to the canners that Suppiger charged infringed its patent.

Based on these facts, the Court said, "It thus appears that [Suppiger] is making use of its patent monopoly to restrain competition in the marketing of unpatented articles, salt tablets, for use with the patented machines, and is aiding in the creation of a limited monopoly in the tablets not within that granted by the patent." Citing Motion Picture Patents, Carbice, and Leitch, the Court stated, "It is the established rule that a patentee who has granted a license on condition that the patented invention be used by the licensee only with unpatented materials furnished by the licensor may not restrain as a contributory infringer one who sells to the licensee like materials for like use."

Such conduct is contrary to the public policy of the United States:

[T]he the public policy which includes inventions within the granted monopoly excludes from it all that is not embraced in the invention. It equally forbids the use of the patent to secure an exclusive right or limited monopoly not granted by the Patent Office and which it is contrary to public policy to grant.

Courts of equity may withhold their aid from a party that asserts a right that it is using contrary to the public interest. Suppiger argued that Motion Picture Patents, Carbice, and Leitch all involved contributory infringement actions where the patentee sought to restrain a defendant from selling unpatented supplies to licensees, but here, Suppiger said:

- Suppiger does not ask the courts to order Morton to stop competing in the sale of salt.
- Rather, Suppiger just asks the courts to order Morton to stop directly infringing the patent.
- The equity maxim that a party seeking the aid of a court of equity must come into court with "clean hands" applies only to the plaintiff's wrongful conduct in the particular act or transaction as to which equity enforcement is sought.
- Therefore, the maxim involved in those cases does not apply to the different transaction—direct infringement—involved here.

The Court did not accept the attempted distinction:

[A]dditional considerations must be taken into account where maintenance of the suit concerns the public interest, as well as the private interests of suitors. Where the patent is used as a means of restraining competition with the patentee's sale of an unpatented product, the successful prosecution of an infringement suit, even against one who is not a competitor in such sale, is a powerful aid to the maintenance of the attempted monopoly of the unpatented article, and is thus a contributing factor in thwarting the public policy underlying the grant of the patent.

The Court explained that equity precedent supported denial of relief that would further wrongdoing by the party seeking the relief and thus harm the public interest:

Equity may rightly withhold its assistance from such a use of the patent by declining to entertain a suit for infringement, and should do so at least until it is made to appear that the improper practice has been abandoned and that the consequences of the misuse of the patent have been dissipated.

The reasons for barring the prosecution of such a suit against one who is not a competitor with the patentee in the sale of the unpatented product are fundamentally the same as those which preclude an infringement suit against a licensee who has violated a condition of the license by using with the licensed machine a competing unpatented article [as protection] Motion Picture Patents Co. v. Universal Film Mfg. Co. . . . It is the adverse effect upon the public interest of a successful infringement suit in conjunction with the patentee's course of conduct which disqualifies him to maintain the suit, regardless of whether the particular defendant has suffered from the misuse of the patent.

These considerations made it unnecessary, the Court added, to decide whether Suppiger had committed an antitrust violation "for we conclude that, in any event, the maintenance of the present suit to restrain petitioner's manufacture or sale of the alleged infringing machines is contrary to public policy, and that the district court rightly dismissed the complaint for want of equity."

=== Kimble v. Marvel ===
In Kimble v. Marvel in 2015, after some years of lower court disapproval and disregard of the patent misuse doctrine developed in Motion Picture Patents, Carbice, and Suppiger, the Supreme Court reaffirmed its principles. In particular, the Court rejected the argument that patent misuse should track antitrust doctrine and insisted that patent misuse is based on patent policy rather than antitrust policy. This is not to say that an antitrust violation will not usually be the basis for holding unenforceable the patents misused in committing the antitrust violation, but rather that the misuse doctrine prohibits even conduct that does not rise (or sink) to the level of an antitrust violation, and where antitrust does not reach challenged conduct patent misuse will do so if patent policy so requires.

== Commentary ==
● A very terse contemporary comment by "A.M.K." in the California Law Review on the Motion Picture Patents case and its overruling of A.B. Dick and the Button-Fastener case stated what the following commentary by Professor Chiapetta explains in greater detail some years later. A.M.K. said:

It by no means follows that because a patentee may withhold the use of the patented article entirely he may license its use with any conditions he chooses. It may be better that the public should not enjoy the article at all than that it should be used under restrictions obnoxious to public policy.

● A 1918 Note in the Iowa Law Review is critical of the Holmes dissent as well. "Mr. Justice Holmes, who has been the most consistent defender of the restriction theory since its inception, argues in the latest decision that since the patentee may wholly withdraw his invention from the market, he should be permitted to sell it on any terms or conditions he may wish to impose." The Note writer says:

The difficulty with this reasoning is that if it proves anything, it proves too much. If it is true that because a man may withhold a patented article from the market, he may therefore impose any conditions upon its use when he sells, it should be equally true that because a man owns a horse that he need not sell, he may at the time of sale impose any conditions upon its future use.

But that cannot be a valid test, he continues, because it is against the common law. "It is a general rule that covenants do not run with personalty and contracts restricting the use or resale of personalty cannot be annexed to the chattel so as to follow and obligate the purchaser by notice," citing Coke and other authorities.

● New York patent attorney (later Federal Circuit judge) Giles Rich commented that "the patent law 'went on a spree from 1896 to 1917.' "

● Professor Chiapetta compares the majority's and Holmes's dissent's respective analyses of the inherency doctrine and concludes that Holmes's analysis ignores the issue of whether the benefits of increased usage of the patented invention under a restrictive license exceed the harms resulting from the restriction. He concedes, for purposes of a "Chicago School" analysis, that it is true that any increased access produces some efficiency improvement. It is not true, however, he insists, that every increase in access produces a net improvement: "That determination requires examining the harms produced by the terms of access. If those harms exceed the benefits then the transaction reduces efficient market operation overall and should be legally prohibited."

He explains, further, that a patentee's simple refusal to license a patent may lead to loss of efficiency but the costs are those arising from the existence of the patent system. "If that produces net inefficiencies, the problem lies exclusively" in the way the U.S. patent system has been set up, which is a matter of congressional choice, subject only to constitutional limitations. Privately constructed terms of access (licensing conditions) can produce additional costs, which may arise from effects of imposing conditions on the licensee. "As the Motion Picture majority properly observes, such rights must be examined to determine whether their harms outweigh the benefits."

The determination of what constitutes a legally cognizable harm that may be balanced off against the benefits of increased access, to decide what is the net harm or benefit "is the purview of general laws." These include contract, tort, and antitrust laws. Unless the constraints of the general law are taken into account, he argues:

[I]ncreased access may, in efficiency terms, be worse for society than no access at all. While the latter merely produces patent law's internal net system efficiency improvement (additional innovation justifying the costs of reduced access), the former can impose additional costs producing a net overall efficiency decrease. Such transactions must be legally prohibited.

The proper question, Chiapatta insists, is whether the majority's or Holmes's legal doctrine better contributes to accomplishing the goal of net overall efficiency increase.

== See also ==
- United States v. Motion Picture Patents Co.
