= United States v. Vehicular Parking Ltd. =

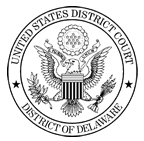
- Court: United States District Court for the District of Delaware
- Full case name: United States v. Vehicular Parking, Limited, et al.
- Decided: March 28, 1944
- Citations: 54 F. Supp. 828; 61 U.S.P.Q. 102

Case history
- Subsequent actions: Modified, 56 F. Supp. 297 (D. Del. 1944); further modified, 61 F. Supp. 656 (D. Del. 1945)

Court membership
- Judge sitting: Paul Conway Leahy

United States v. Vehicular Parking Ltd. is a patent–antitrust case in which the United States Government eroded the doctrine of United States v. General Electric Co. permitting patentees to fix licensee prices, but failed to persuade the court to decree royalty-free licensing as a remedy.

== Background ==
Patent illustration from pool patent on coin controlled timing mechanism

Defendants Parkrite Corp. and Dual Parking Meter Co. owned patents on parking meters and they manufactured and sold them. In 1936 defendant Joynt wrote to defendants Taylor and Symington proposing the formation of a patent pool:

The parking meter business is new and seems to offer ample opportunity for profit. From my study of the Patent aspects it seems that very little has been done to create a Patent monopoly. It is my opinion that a fair start toward such a monopoly could be gained by pooling the Patents and Patent Applications of Dual Parking Meter Company and Parkrite Corporation.

Joynt did further research and wrote Taylor and Symington again:

The [Doyle patent] owned by Parkrite Corporation is the only Patent in this field that seems to have claims which in any way might be construed as broadly covering a parking meter of the honor system type. These claims are not such, however, as should be put into litigation because I am afraid they might be invalidated by certain prior art. At present they are accorded a prima facie validity which could be used to advantage in discouraging competition. The actual strength of the Patent Monopoly must be gotten from a number of Patents covering individual types of parking meters. If the [Doyle] patent were pooled with the other patents owned by Parkrite Corporation and the several Patents and Patent Applications owned by Dual Parking Meter Company, I feel that this pooling would result in a first rate step toward establishing a dominant position in the parking meter field.

In 1937 Vehicular Parking, Ltd. was formed to hold patents. It acquired Parkrite's patents and then Parkrite was absorbed. Vehicular tried to get M.H. Rhodes. Inc., a price–cutter, to join the pool but was unsuccessful. Vehicular then sued Rhodes for patent infringement. Rhodes finally agreed to join, but objected to following the price stabilization program until the rest of the industry joined the combination. Vehicular was unsuccessful in persuading Dual, which owned the key Doyle patent, to join. Vehicular sued Dual for patent infringement but Dual countered with its own patent infringement suit and alleged that Vehicular had conspired with other manufacturers to create an unlawful monopoly in the parking meter industry and to fix prices. Vehicular managed to gain control of Dual and arranged to have Dual's patents assigned to Vehicular, and for Vehicular to sign the resale price maintenance agreement. The rest of the industry then joined the combin.

Defendant manufacturers Vehicular, Rhodes, Dual, Duncan, Mico, Karpark and Standard agreed to some 21 restrictions, including:

- "Manual" meters would not be sold below $35 and "automatic" meters not below $45.
- "Reasonable" prices would be charged for parts and services.
- A 2½% discount would be maximum. 5% interest per annum would be charged on all deferred payments.
- No free service or maintenance. Guarantees against defective workmanship to be limited to one year.
- No deliveries in anticipation of price advances.
- Used and reconditioned manual meters not to be sold below $25, such automatic meters not below $35.
- Maximum of $15 for trade-in allowance on second-hand meters.
- Violations of agreement subject to fines.
- Vehicular to enforce patents held by it against other manufacturers of parking meters.
- Corporate defendants to pay Vehicular 4% of the sales price of each meter in order to police the industry.

Counsel warned of antitrust risks:

The admitted object of licensor and licensees is to control the industry among themselves, all of it if possible, and if not all then at least most of it. Prices are fixed for everything, even for services and even for standards, whether patented or not. Limitations are fixed as to amount of bond and the bonding period. Minimum prices are even fixed for second-hand meters which, under the law, are absolutely clear of patent monopoly once sold. The agreement runs until the expiration of the last patent in the list. It is not even necessary to consider the future to perceive that within a month the agreement will apply to anything made under the 1923 patent and will successively apply to articles made under the succeeding patents, even after the patents expire and their entire subject matter is free to the public.

Nonetheless, during 1940 and 1941 defendants met, discussed who should and who should not join their group, agreed from time to time to lower or increase prices, and varied their joint terms and conditions of sale.

== District court ruling ==
The United States sued Vehicular, other members of the pool, and various individual participants in the conduct involved here, in the United States District Court for the District of Delaware. The government alleged that the defendants "entered into a combination and conspiracy to restrain and monopolize trade with respect to (1) manufacture, distribution and sale of parking meters and (2) United States letters patent relating to such parking meters." The case was tried before Judge Paul Conway Leahy.

The district court observed that the defendants' acts, "considered in the light of the fact that defendants controlled 95% to 98% of the parking meter business in the United States, disclose an integrated plan to control the manufacture and sale of parking meters." Moreover, even assuming that all of:

Vehicular's patents are valid, the agreements in suit attempt to extend the lawful patent monopoly in an illegal manner. Defendants cannot by concert of action fix prices for the adjunctive devices obviously not within the claims of the patents, i.e., the coin counters, the standards and collars. . . . When Vehicular attempts to control the making and vending of products other than the patented meter, such control is obviously not bottomed on the patent statute and is far beyond the claims upon which the lawful monopoly rests. Restrictions on price for servicing meters, and prohibition against free servicing are not protected by any of the claims found in Vehicular's collection of patents; such restrictions are illegal.

The court said this combination was indistinguishable from that held illegal in Standard Sanitary Mfg. Co. v. United States. However, in United States v. General Electric Co. the Court held that one manufacturer of a patented product could license another manufacturer to make the patented product at a specified price. The defendants rely "if not wholly at least substantially, on this case." But, the court countered, the instant case is sharply distinguishable from the 1926 General Electric case: "General Electric was engaged in the manufacture of its patented device; and to protect its legal monopoly the Supreme Court held that it had the right to insist that its licensee would not undersell it in competition." Chief Justice Taft said in that case:

When the patentee licenses another to make and vend and retains the right to continue to make and vend on his own account, the price at which his licensee will sell will necessarily affect the price at which he can sell his own patented goods. It would seem entirely reasonable that he should say to the licensee, "Yes, you may make and sell articles under my patent but not so as to destroy the profit that I wish to obtain by making them and se‘lling them myself."

But nothing in that case says "that the patentee can agree with group-licensees to fix the price at which all may sell." Vehicular is the patent owner nut not a manufacturer. "The price fixing, then, is for the benefit of the licensees—not to protect Vehicular's sales of meters because Vehicular is not engaged in manufacturing and sale." This case is a very different one:

Where the defendant corporations control from 95% to 98% of an industry, with threat of competition removed, upon agreement that others will be refused "to join the fold", a tight monopoly exists, especially where the parties to the agreement before they became parties to it were in free and open competition and sold the devices at prices to the public much below those established by the agreement. . . . [W]here the aggregation submit to rules (and fines for the violation of such rules) to prevent competition inter sese and from outsiders, agree who should become members of the family and who should never be adopted, the product and services each should traffic in, the prices and terms and conditions of sale of such, and the compensation each shall pay to persons to attempt to sell the product, then such a business manifestly "takes away the freedom of action of [its] members." For, in such situations, "the combination is in reality an extra-governmental agency, which prescribes rules for the regulation and restraint of interstate commerce, and provides extra-judicial tribunals for determination and punishment of violations, and thus 'trenches upon the power of the national legislature and violates the statute.'" [quoting Fashion Originators Guild v. FTC].

Patent pools are not objectionable as such, the court said. but they are when "the design of persons in such acquisition and pooling is to restrain trade." The court then quoted the letter from Joynt to Taylor and Symington (see Background section, above) in which Joynt proposed forming a patent pool to gain a monopoly. The court pointed next to the agreement with Standard to eliminate the manufacture and sale of "free-time" meters, citing cases holding it illegal for a patentee to use "the lawful monopoly granted by the patent as a means of suppressing the manufacture and sale of competing unpatented articles" because the purpose is "to extend the bounds of its lawful monopoly to make, use and vend the patented device to the extent where such device would be the only one available to a user of such an article."

The court then turned to what remedy was appropriate. The government argued that "the only way effectually to dissolve the monopoly is to remove the source of the monopoly power, viz., enjoin defendants from instituting patent infringement suits and to compel the patent-owning defendants to give all applicants royalty–free and unrestricted licenses." The court said it would put that issue off for a future hearing because:

[A]t this time, I am not certain the patents in suit should, as a practical matter, be virtually cancelled by the inclusion in the proposed decree of the provisions commanding royalty-free licensing. I have no doubt that there may be judicial death-sentence of a patent in a proper case, but I must be convinced that this is the case.

== Further proceedings in district court ==
● Several months later the district court held a further hearing on relief.

First, the court ruled over the defendants' opposition that the injunction against continued violation should extend to the individual defendants, "in view of the fact that they were real forces in the combination and not merely employees carrying out corporate policies"

Conclusion of Law No. 19 had recited: "The defendants have effectuated a conspiracy to obtain and use patents and patent rights in violation of the Sherman Act and therefore should be enjoined from enforcing those patent rights, whether by suits for infringement or suits to collect royalties." Defendants moved to strike this conclusion and the corresponding paragraph of the proposed decree, which permanently enjoined the conduct. The court said the defendants are free to petition the court at any time in the future to argue that the effects of the abuse of the patents have been fully dissipated so as to reinstate patent enforceability. But that does not mean, the court added, that defendants' "mere declarations that they will carry the decree into effect" will suffice:

Exculpation in these cases consists of a change in the method of doing business. When and if defendants are able to show a course of conduct which is free from the present taint of illegality, then consideration will be given to [reinstate patent enforceability].

Finally, the court agreed with the defendants not to require reasonable-royalty or royalty-free licensing. The issue is pending in the Supreme in Hartford Empire Co. v. United States, the court said, and therefore consideration of the matter "will be postponed until after the Supreme Court speaks."

● A year later Vehicular moved for modification of the final decree.

Once again, removal of the injunction against individual defendants was sought. The court said nothing had changed in the interim to justify a modification of this provision.

The Supreme Court had now decided Hartford-Empire Co. v. United States, and the government now argued that the court has power to require royalty-free licensing. The district court disagreed; it said that would be tantamount to cancelling the patent but there is no express statutory or judicial authority for such antitrust relief. Instead, the court ordered mandatory, reasonable-royalty licensing.

Finally, the defendants claimed they should once again be permitted to enforce their patents. The court said:

A year has passed. There has been no disclosure or report (either to this court or the Department of Justice) of the defendants' present or future methods of doing business or the manner in which they are utilizing their parking-meter patent rights. It is now concluded that an additional passage of time must occur for it to appear that defendants have exculpated themselves from their former violations of the anti-trust laws. Such report may come in the future; but until then the specific sanctions imposed . . . must stand.
