= United States v. Motion Picture Patents Co. =

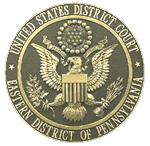
- Court: United States District Court for the Eastern District of Pennsylvania
- Full case name: United States v. Motion Picture Patents Co. et al.
- Decided: October 1, 1915
- Docket nos.: 889
- Citation: 225 F. 800

Case history
- Subsequent actions: Appeal dismissed, Motion Picture Patents Co. v. United States, 247 U.S. 524 (1918).

Court membership
- Judge sitting: Oliver Booth Dickinson

United States v. Motion Picture Patents Co., 225 F. 800 (E.D. Pa. 1915), was a civil antitrust prosecution overlapping to some extent with the issues in the decision in the Supreme Court's Motion Picture Patents case. After the trial court found that the defendants violated §§ 1 and 2 of the Sherman Act by establishing control over "trade in films, cameras, projecting machines, and other accessories of the motion picture business," by their patent licensing practices and other conduct, they appealed to the Supreme Court. After the Supreme Court's 1917 decision in Motion Picture Patents Co. v. Universal Film Manufacturing Co., however, the parties dismissed the appeal by stipulation (mutual agreement) in 1918 that the decision had made the defendants' appeal futile.

== Background ==
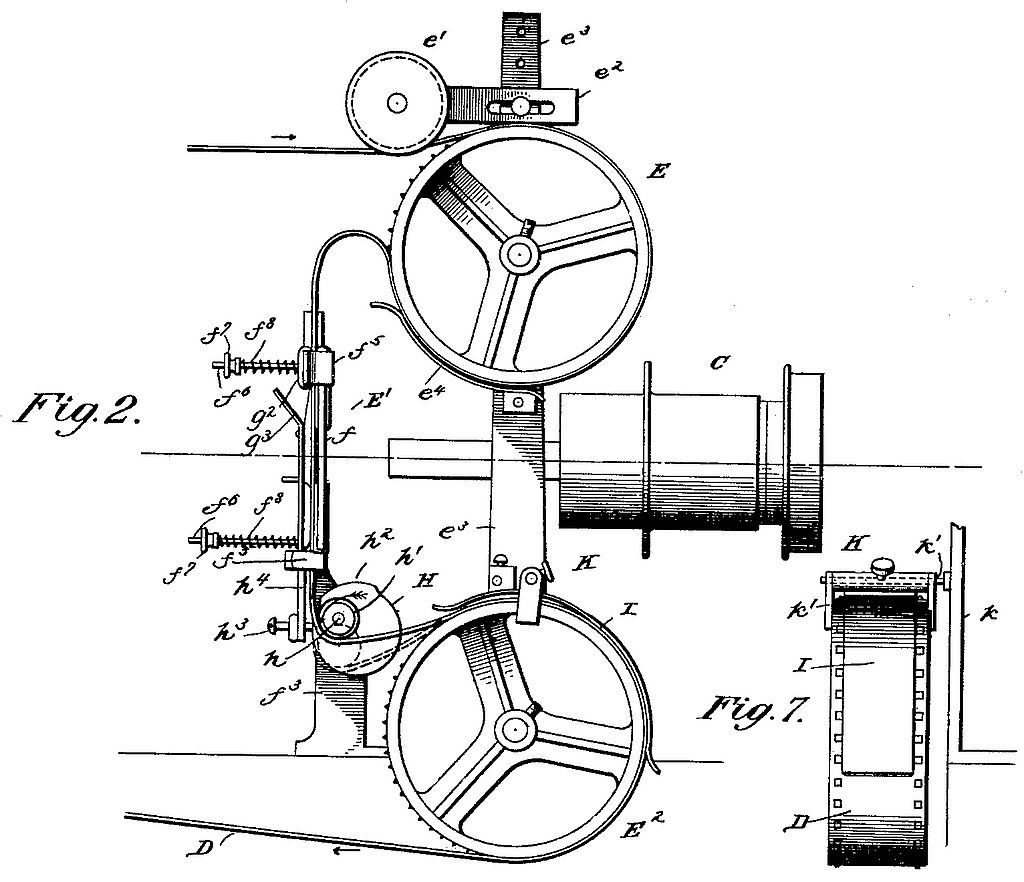
The Edison Trust's control of the Latham Loop Patent gave it domination over the motion picture industry

Thomas Edison developed and patented the first commercial motion picture camera and player (projector) in the United States (in Europe a handful of inventors had already developed and patented similar but different technology), and others followed in his steps, leading to extensive rivalry and patent litigation. In December 1908, Edison formed a combination of his Edison Manufacturing Company and nine other owners of film-related patents: the Motion Picture Patents Company (MPPC), also known as the Motion Picture Patents Trust, or the Edison Trust. The Trust controlled major patents dominating motion picture technology, including patents covering film stock, cameras, and projectors—including the so-called Latham loop patent (U.S. Pat. No. 707,934), a key feature of virtually all motion picture cameras then in use. Using the combined patent rights, the MPPC was able to exact high fees from their competitors for their use of film stock, cameras, and projectors. "The MPPC quickly became a force to be reckoned with, frequently and strenuously asserting its patent rights against independent movie producers through litigation." Between 1909 and 1918, MPCC brought about 40 patent infringement suits against competitors to maintain its control over the industry.

Initially, the federal courts refused to consider antitrust violation as a defense to a patent infringement charge. For example, in March 1910, in two cases in the Southern District of New York, the court held that "the charge, if established, that the complainant is itself, or is a member of, a combination in violation of the federal anti-trust statute, is not a defense available in an action for the infringement of a patent". In a third case later that year, the court held: "Such a suit [for patent infringement] is not based on contract, but on tort, and, of course, the fact that a man has entered into some illegal contract does not authorize others to injure him with impunity."

The Trust established a monopoly on all aspects of the motion picture business. Eastman Kodak, a member of the Trust, owned the patent on raw film stock and it agreed to only sell film stock only to other members. The camera patents prevented companies, not members of or licensed by the Trust, from making films. The projector patents enabled the Trust to require distributors and theaters to screen only the Trust members' films. In addition, the Trust established uniform prices for renting films to theaters. While the patents were the main effective to establish industry control, in some instances the Trust made use of hired thugs and mob connections to violently disrupt productions that were not licensed by the Trust.

In August 1912, the Department of Justice brought an antitrust prosecution against the members of the Trust in the federal court in the Eastern District of Pennsylvania.

== Ruling of district court ==
The defendants made two principal defense arguments. The first was that the "gravamen of the offense may be gathered from the general summary that it is a conspiracy to drive from the field all other traders in the things which make possible the practice of the motion picture art, and to monopolize to themselves that trade, and through this the practice of the art itself." The defendants argued that they were not engaged in trade or commerce, to which the antitrust laws are limited: "The control, with the seeking of which the defendants are charged, is therefore the control of an art, and not of trade, or of anything which is the subject of commerce, or can be brought within the laws relating thereto."

The court brushed the argument aside. It said that "the charge made against these defendants is that, whatever may have been their final purpose with respect to the control of the art, what they combined to do, and have done, is to restrain trade or commerce in these films, which are articles of trade and the subject of large interstate transactions, in which the defendants had part."

The court turned to the main defense—that the defendants' ownership of patent rights relieves them of antitrust liability. The court conceded:

The [patentee's exclusive] right to sell carries with it the right to withhold from sale, or to part with the possession without parting with the ownership. It also confers the right to impose reasonable and legal conditions of bailment or sale "restricting the terms upon which the [patented] article may be used and the price to be demanded therefor." All these propositions are clear, and have been expressly held to be the law.

But: "The limitation that the terms must be legal should, however, not be lost sight of." For example, a post-sale restriction on price, "which will follow the article through successive sales, will not be upheld." While the patent and antitrust laws must be accommodated to one another, "it cannot be that the grant of a patent right confers a license to do that which the law condemns." A patentee may simply enforce his right to exclude infringement, but he must not use his patent "as a weapon to disable a rival contestant, or to drive him from the field," for "he cannot justify such use."

The court said, "As a conclusion to the whole discussion, we deem the Bath Tub Case to be decisive of the principle contended for by the United States." In that case, the Supreme Court found that the defendants' conduct "transcended what was necessary to protect the use of the patent or the monopoly which the law conferred upon it. They passed to the purpose and accomplished a restraint of trade condemned by the Sherman law." They did so because they "combined the manufacturers and jobbers" to form a conspiracy in violation of the Sherman Act. That brought the court "to the consideration of the special facts of this case."

The court said it would assume that the defendants had "no purpose to offend against or to evade the law, and that their intentions were as beneficent and have resulted in an much good to the patronage of the art as is claimed, and that this good bears a fair relation to the profits received by them." That is irrelevant because, as the Supreme Court said in the Bathtub Case, "the law is its own measure of right and wrong." The law is also:

the judge of whether a transaction is of the character which it condemns. If, in the judgment of the law, a contract or co-operating agreement is such as to work an undue and unreasonable restraint of trade, and through such restraint to monopolize trade or any part of it, the judgment is one of condemnation, no matter how innocent or otherwise praiseworthy the motives of those who had part in it.

The court then reviewed the defendants' course of conduct"

Shortly after the formation of the MPPC in 1908, it licensed 116 jobbers to distribute the members' films to theaters. Within a short time, however, the MPPC decided to absorb this part of the trade, and the General Film Company was formed to take over the business of distribution, and 115 of the 116 jobbers were eliminated. Lists of exchanges and of theaters were prepared, and then MPPC permitted no exchange to have films, and no theater to exhibit them, unless all of the defendants consented. No one could be on the approved list except such as bought all supplies from the defendants, and any who dealt with their competitors was dropped. Every theater was required to pay a royalty for the use of a projecting machine, even when the machine had been owned by the exhibitor before the MPPC combination was formed. The defendants did not merely combine to protect their patents against infringement. Their efforts:

went far beyond the fair and normal possible scope of any efforts to protect such rights, and that as a direct and intended result of such undue and unreasonable restrictions the defendants have monopolized a large part of the interstate trade and commerce in films, cameras, projecting machines, and other articles of commerce accessory to the motion picture business.

The court therefore concluded:

[T]he contracts enumerated in the petition, and the combination there described, were a conspiracy in restraint of trade or commerce among the several states and with foreign nations, and were and are illegal, and that the defendants and each of them . . . have attempted to monopolize, and have monopolized, and have combined and conspired, among themselves and with each other, to monopolize, a part of the trade or commerce . . . consisting of the trade in films, cameras, projecting machines, and other accessories of the motion picture business trade in films, cameras, projecting machines, and other accessories of the motion picture business.

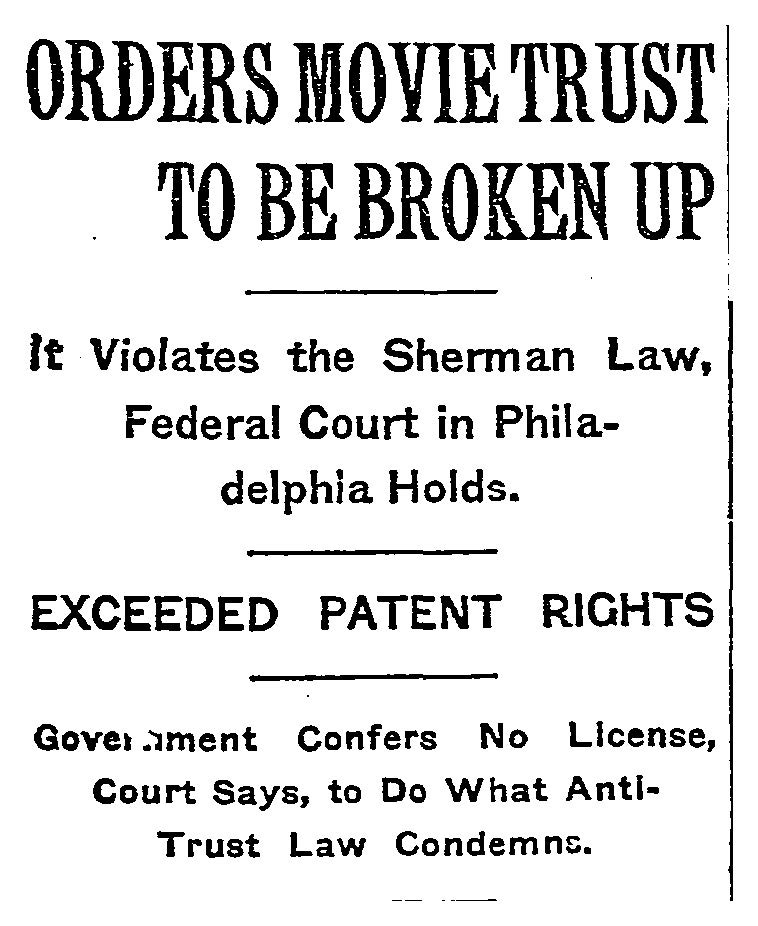
N.Y. Times headline announcing ruling that Trust must be broken up

The court then ordered that the Trust must be dissolved. The defendants appealed to the Supreme Court.

== Intervening Supreme Court Motion Picture Patents decision ==
After the district court tried this case, several developments in case law adversely affected MPPC's position. In 1913 in Bauer & Cie. v. O'Donnell, the Supreme Court held that a patentee could not use its patent to fix resale prices. Later, in October 1914, Congress passed the Clayton Act, making it an antitrust violation to sell goods on the condition that the buyer not deal in the goods of another seller. These were two of MPPC's practices.

In addition, in Motion Picture Patents Co. v. Universal Film Mfg. Co., MPPC sued a licensee, Universal, to which MPPC had sold a film projector subject to the licensee's promise that only MPPC's films would be used in the machine. Because another company's films were subsequently used with the machine, MPPC sued for patent infringement. The district court dismissed the complaint. The Second Circuit affirmed in 1916, holding: "If the prohibitions of the Clayton Act mean anything at all, this case falls within them, and the restrictions as to use of films other than complainant's with the projecting machines are therefore void." In 1917 the Supreme Court affirmed this ruling in Motion Picture Patents Co. v. Universal Film Mfg. Co. Finally, in January 1918, the Latham Loop patent was held invalid, removing the keystone of MPPC's patent structure.

These rulings made it clear that it was futile for MPPC to pursue its Supreme Court appeal of the case, and in June 1918 MPCC stipulated with the government to a dismissal of the appeal.
