= List of United States Supreme Court cases, volume 226 =

Supreme Court of the United States
- Interactive map of Supreme Court of the United States
- 38°53′26″N 77°00′16″W
- Established: March 4, 1789; 236 years ago
- Location: Washington, D.C.
- Coordinates: 38°53′26″N 77°00′16″W
- Composition method: Presidential nomination with Senate confirmation
- Authorised by: Constitution of the United States, Art. III, § 1
- Judge term length: life tenure, subject to impeachment and removal
- Number of positions: 9 (by statute)
- Website: supremecourt.gov

This is a list of cases reported in volume 226 of United States Reports, decided by the Supreme Court of the United States in 1912 and 1913.

== Justices of the Supreme Court at the time of volume 226 U.S. ==
The Supreme Court is established by Article III, Section 1 of the Constitution of the United States, which says: "The judicial Power of the United States, shall be vested in one supreme Court . . .". The size of the Court is not specified; the Constitution leaves it to Congress to set the number of justices. Under the Judiciary Act of 1789 Congress originally fixed the number of justices at six (one chief justice and five associate justices). Since 1789 Congress has varied the size of the Court from six to seven, nine, ten, and back to nine justices (always including one chief justice).

When the cases in volume 226 were decided the Court comprised the following nine members:

Portrait	Justice	Office	Home State	Succeeded	Date confirmed by the Senate (Vote)	Tenure on Supreme Court
	Edward Douglass White	Chief Justice	Louisiana	Melville Fuller	December 12, 1910 (Acclamation)	December 19, 1910 – May 19, 1921 (Died)
	Joseph McKenna	Associate Justice	California	Stephen Johnson Field	January 21, 1898 (Acclamation)	January 26, 1898 – January 5, 1925 (Retired)
	Oliver Wendell Holmes Jr.	Associate Justice	Massachusetts	Horace Gray	December 4, 1902 (Acclamation)	December 8, 1902 – January 12, 1932 (Retired)
	William R. Day	Associate Justice	Ohio	George Shiras Jr.	February 23, 1903 (Acclamation)	March 2, 1903 – November 13, 1922 (Retired)
	Horace Harmon Lurton	Associate Justice	Tennessee	Rufus W. Peckham	December 20, 1909 (Acclamation)	January 3, 1910 – July 12, 1914 (Died)
	Charles Evans Hughes	Associate Justice	New York	David Josiah Brewer	May 2, 1910 (Acclamation)	October 10, 1910 – June 10, 1916 (Resigned)
	Willis Van Devanter	Associate Justice	Wyoming	Edward Douglass White (as Associate Justice)	December 15, 1910 (Acclamation)	January 3, 1911 – June 2, 1937 (Retired)
	Joseph Rucker Lamar	Associate Justice	Georgia	William Henry Moody	December 15, 1910 (Acclamation)	January 3, 1911 – January 2, 1916 (Died)
	Mahlon Pitney	Associate Justice	New Jersey	John Marshall Harlan	March 13, 1912 (50–26)	March 18, 1912 – December 31, 1922 (Resigned)

== Notable Case in 226 U.S. ==
=== Standard Sanitary Mfg. Co. v. United States ===
In Standard Sanitary Mfg. Co. v. United States, 226 U.S. 20 (1912), also known as the Bathtub Trust case, the Supreme Court held unanimously that ownership of patent rights does not immunize the owner from the antitrust laws prohibiting combinations in unreasonable restraint of trade. The Court famously said that the Sherman Act "is its own measure of right and wrong, of what it permits or forbids, and the judgment of the courts cannot be set up against it in a supposed accommodation of its policy with the good intention of parties, and, it may be, of some good results." A commentary stated, "This decision has become the leading case on the subject of the relation of the patent law and Sherman law to each other."

== Citation style ==
Under the Judiciary Act of 1789 the federal court structure at the time comprised District Courts, which had general trial jurisdiction; Circuit Courts, which had mixed trial and appellate (from the US District Courts) jurisdiction; and the United States Supreme Court, which had appellate jurisdiction over the federal District and Circuit courts—and for certain issues over state courts. The Supreme Court also had limited original jurisdiction (i.e., in which cases could be filed directly with the Supreme Court without first having been heard by a lower federal or state court). There were one or more federal District Courts and/or Circuit Courts in each state, territory, or other geographical region.

The Judiciary Act of 1891 created the United States Courts of Appeals and reassigned the jurisdiction of most routine appeals from the district and circuit courts to these appellate courts. The Act created nine new courts that were originally known as the "United States Circuit Courts of Appeals." The new courts had jurisdiction over most appeals of lower court decisions. The Supreme Court could review either legal issues that a court of appeals certified or decisions of court of appeals by writ of certiorari.

On January 1, 1912, the effective date of the Judicial Code of 1911, the old Circuit Courts were abolished, with their remaining trial court jurisdiction transferred to the U.S. District Courts.

Bluebook citation style is used for case names, citations, and jurisdictions.

- "# Cir." = United States Court of Appeals
  - e.g., "3d Cir." = United States Court of Appeals for the Third Circuit
- "C.C.D." = United States Circuit Court for the District of . . .
  - e.g.,"C.C.D.N.J." = United States Circuit Court for the District of New Jersey
- "D." = United States District Court for the District of . . .
  - e.g.,"D. Mass." = United States District Court for the District of Massachusetts
- "E." = Eastern; "M." = Middle; "N." = Northern; "S." = Southern; "W." = Western
  - e.g.,"C.C.S.D.N.Y." = United States Circuit Court for the Southern District of New York
  - e.g.,"M.D. Ala." = United States District Court for the Middle District of Alabama
- "Ct. Cl." = United States Court of Claims
- The abbreviation of a state's name alone indicates the highest appellate court in that state's judiciary at the time.
  - e.g.,"Pa." = Supreme Court of Pennsylvania
  - e.g.,"Me." = Supreme Judicial Court of Maine

== List of cases in volume 226 U.S. ==
Case Name	Page and year	Opinion of the Court	Concurring opinion(s)	Dissenting opinion(s)	Lower Court	Disposition
Breese v. United States	1 (1912)	Holmes	none	none	4th Cir.	certification
Harty v. Victoria	12 (1912)	Holmes	none	none	Phil.	dismissed
United States v. Baltimore et al. Railway Company	14 (1912)	Holmes	none	none	Comm. Ct.	affirmed
Standard Sanitary Manufacturing Company v. United States	20 (1912)	McKenna	none	none	D. Md.	affirmed
Smith v. Hitchcock	53 (1912)	Holmes	none	none	D.C. Cir.	affirmed
United States v. Union Pacific Railroad Company	61 (1912)	Day	none	none	C.C.D. Utah	reversed
Louisiana Navigation Company, Ltd. v. Oyster Commission	99 (1912)	White	none	none	La.	dismissed
Deming v. Carlisle Packing Company	102 (1912)	White	none	none	Wash.	dismissed
First National Bank v. Littlefield	110 (1912)	White	none	none	2d Cir.	affirmed
Selover Bates and Company v. Walsh	112 (1912)	McKenna	none	none	Minn.	affirmed
Taylor v. Columbian University	126 (1912)	McKenna	none	none	D.C. Cir.	affirmed
Eubank v. City of Richmond	137 (1912)	McKenna	none	none	Va.	reversed
Burnet v. Desmornes y Alvarez	145 (1912)	Holmes	none	none	P.R.	affirmed
Jones v. Springer	148 (1912)	Holmes	none	none	N.M.	affirmed
Central Lumber Company v. South Dakota	157 (1912)	Holmes	none	none	S.D.	affirmed
Southwestern Brewery and Ice Company v. Schmidt	162 (1912)	Holmes	none	none	N.M.	affirmed
Miller v. Guasti	170 (1912)	Day	none	none	N.Y. Sup. Ct.	affirmed
443 Cans Egg Product v. United States	172 (1912)	Day	none	none	3d Cir.	reversed
Toyota v. Hawaii	184 (1912)	Hughes	none	none	Sup. Ct. Terr. Haw.	affirmed
Purity Extract and Tonic Company v. Lynch	192 (1912)	Hughes	none	none	Miss.	affirmed
Buck Stove and Range Company v. Vickers	205 (1912)	VanDevanter	none	none	Kan.	reversed
Yazoo and Mississippi Valley Railroad Company v. Jackson Vinegar Company	217 (1912)	VanDevanter	none	none	Miss. Cir. Ct.	affirmed
German Alliance Insurance Company v. Home Water Supply Company	220 (1912)	Lamar	none	none	4th Cir.	affirmed
Veve v. Sanchez	234 (1912)	Lamar	none	none	D.P.R.	reversed
Beach v. United States	243 (1912)	Pitney	none	none	Ct. Cl.	affirmed
Rosenthal v. New York	260 (1912)	Pitney	none	none	N.Y. Cnty. Ct.	affirmed
Zakonaite v. Wolf	272 (1912)	Pitney	none	none	E.D. Mo.	affirmed
National Surety Company v. Architectural Decorating Company	276 (1912)	Pitney	none	none	Minn.	affirmed
United States v. Union Stock Yard Transit Company of Chicago	286 (1912)	Day	none	none	Comm. Ct.	multiple
Florida ex rel. Wailes v. Croom	309 (1912)	White	none	none	Fla.	dismissed
Robertson v. Gordon	311 (1912)	Holmes	none	none	D.C. Cir.	reversed
Murray v. City of Pocatello	318 (1912)	Holmes	none	none	Idaho	affirmed
United States v. Reading Company	324 (1912)	Lurton	none	none	C.C.E.D. Pa.	multiple
McLean v. United States	374 (1912)	McKenna	none	none	Ct. Cl.	reversed
Wood, Trustee in Bankruptcy v. Wilbert's Sons Shingle and Lumber Company	384 (1912)	McKenna	none	none	E.D. La.	affirmed
Darnell v. Indiana	390 (1912)	Holmes	none	none	Ind.	affirmed
Keatley v. Furey	399 (1912)	Holmes	none	none	C.C.N.D. Ill.	dismissed
Williams v. City of Talladega	404 (1912)	Day	none	none	Ala.	reversed
Ex parte United States	420 (1913)	White	none	none	E.D. Mo.	prohibition granted
Chicago, Rock Island and Pacific Railroad Company v. Hardwick Elevator Company	426 (1913)	White	none	none	Minn.	reversed
Hannum v. United States	436 (1913)	White	none	none	Ct. Cl.	affirmed
Anderson v. Smith	439 (1913)	White	none	none	D.C. Cir.	affirmed
Illinois Central Railroad Company v. Henderson Elevator Company	441 (1913)	White	none	none	Ky.	reversed
Preston v. City of Chicago	447 (1913)	White	none	none	Ill.	dismissed
Illinois ex rel. Gersch v. City of Chicago	451 (1913)	White	none	none	Ill.	dismissed
Ubeda v. Zialcita	452 (1913)	Holmes	none	none	Phil.	affirmed
Pittsburg Steel Company v. Baltimore Equitable Society	455 (1913)	Holmes	none	none	Md.	affirmed
Marshall Dental Manufacturing Company v. Iowa	460 (1913)	Holmes	none	none	Iowa	affirmed
Kalanianaole v. Smithies	462 (1913)	Holmes	none	none	Sup. Ct. Terr. Haw.	affirmed
Ewing v. City of Leavenworth	464 (1913)	Day	none	none	Kan.	affirmed
United States v. Union Pacific Railroad Company	470 (1913)	Day	none	none	D. Utah	decree rejected
Wheeler v. United States	478 (1913)	Day	none	none	D. Mass.	affirmed
Adams Express Company v. Croninger	491 (1913)	Lurton	none	none	Ky. Cir. Ct.	reversed
Chicago, Burlington and Quincy Railroad Company v. Miller	513 (1913)	Lurton	none	none	Neb.	reversed
Chicago, St. Paul, Minneapolis and Omaha Railway Company v. Latta	519 (1913)	Lurton	none	none	8th Cir.	reversed
McNamara v. Henkel	520 (1913)	Hughes	none	none	S.D.N.Y.	affirmed
United States v. Patten	525 (1913)	VanDevanter	none	Lurton	C.C.S.D.N.Y.	reversed
Plumley v. United States	545 (1913)	Lamar	none	none	Ct. Cl.	affirmed
Bunker Hill and Sullivan Mining and Concentrating Company v. United States	548 (1913)	Lamar	none	none	9th Cir.	affirmed
Thompson v. Thompson	551 (1913)	Pitney	none	none	D.C. Cir.	affirmed
Evans v. United States	567 (1913)	Pitney	none	none	Ct. Cl.	affirmed
Missouri, Kansas and Texas Railway Company v. Wulf	570 (1913)	Pitney	none	none	5th Cir.	affirmed
Schmidinger v. City of Chicago	578 (1913)	Day	none	none	Ill.	affirmed
El Paso and Southwestern Railroad Company v. Eichel	590 (1913)	Pitney	none	none	Tex. Civ. App.	dismissed
