= Standard Sanitary Manufacturing Co. v. United States =

- Supreme Court of the United States

Argued October 15–17, 1912 Decided November 18, 1912
- Full case name: Standard Sanitary Manufacturing Company v. United States of America
- Citations: 226 U.S. 20 (more) 33 S. Ct. 9; 57 L. Ed. 107; 1912 U.S. LEXIS 2129

Case history
- Prior: United States v. Standard Sanitary Mfg. Co., 191 F. 172 (C.C.D. Md. 1911).

Court membership
- Chief Justice Edward D. White Associate Justices Joseph McKenna · Oliver W. Holmes Jr. William R. Day · Horace H. Lurton; Charles E. Hughes · Willis Van Devanter; Joseph R. Lamar · Mahlon Pitney

Case opinion
- Majority: McKenna, joined by a unanimous court

Standard Sanitary Manufacturing Co. v. United States, 226 U.S. 20 (1912), also known as the Bathtub Trust case, was a United States Supreme Court decision in which the Court held unanimously that ownership of patent rights does not immunize the owner from the antitrust laws prohibiting combinations in unreasonable restraint of trade. The Court famously said that the Sherman Act "is its own measure of right and wrong, of what it permits or forbids, and the judgment of the courts cannot be set up against it in a supposed accommodation of its policy with the good intention of parties, and, it may be, of some good results." A 1917 commentary said, "This decision has become the leading case on the subject of the relation of the patent law and Sherman law to each other."

== Background ==
=== Formation of the Bathtub Trust ===
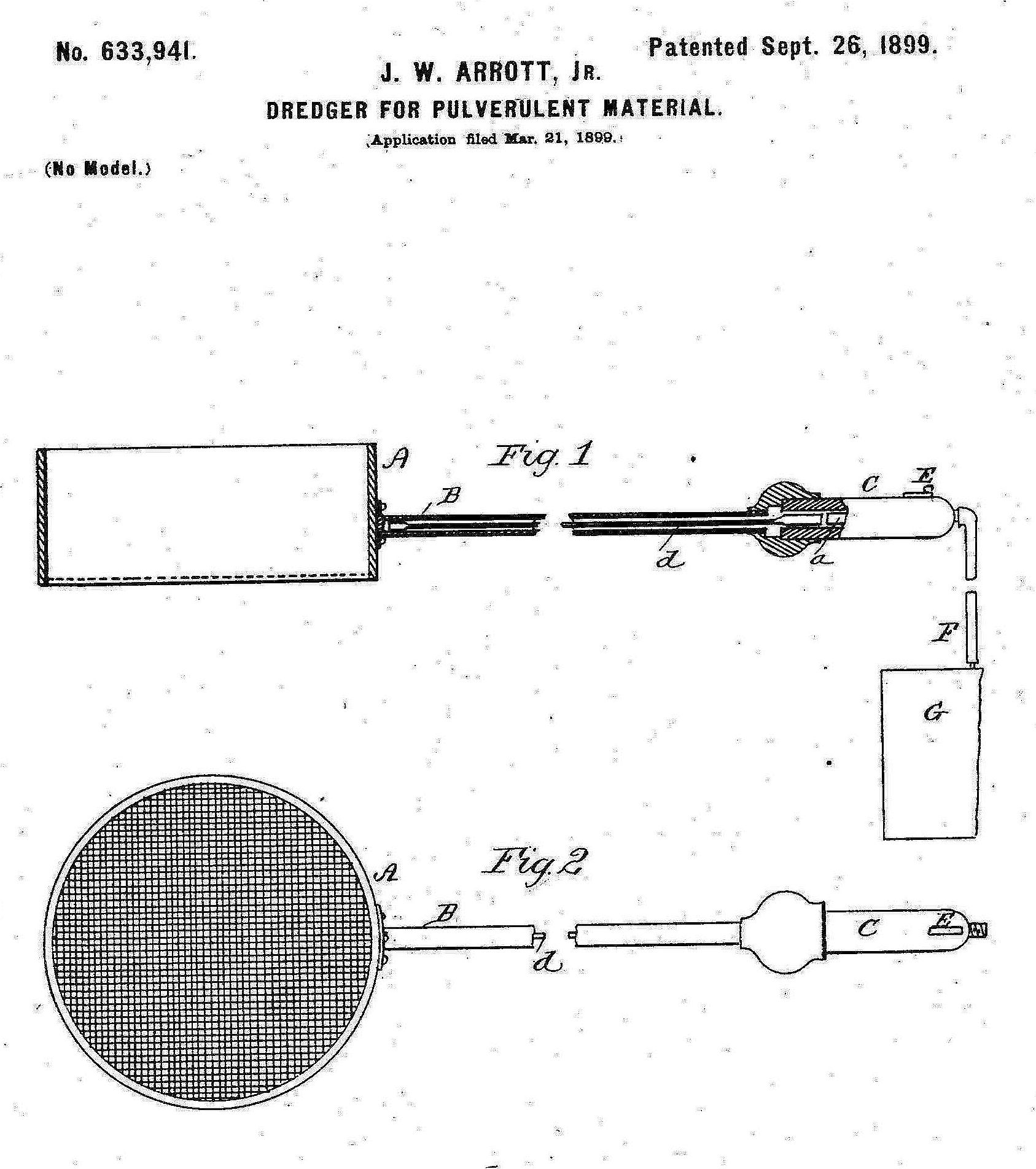
Automatic dredger of U.S. Pat. No. 633,941

Prior to 1909, the enameled bathroom ware industry was subject to rampant price cutting. "Competition had been fierce. It had not always been either wise or honest. A badly made article may look well enough to deceive the average householder. Many such had been put on the market."

Edwin L. Wayman acquired ownership of patents on tools for use in enameling unpatented bathtubs, toilets, sinks, and similar unpatented products. Three patents covered automatic "dredging" tools. The automatic dredger is a device somewhat like a kitchen flour–sifter that sprinkles enameling power (ground glass) on red–hot (1200 °F to 1500 °F) iron fixtures. It is more efficient than dredging by hand, in that it uses less powder, spreads the powder more evenly, is faster, and requires less labor. "[W]hile it is conceded that merchantable ware can be made without its use, still the advantages of using it are so great that as a commercial proposition the ware cannot be made without it."

As Wayman stated the facts:

The manufacturers using the process in use prior to Arrott's invention were unable to successfully compete with those using the Arrott invention, and, moreover, produced a disproportionate number of defective, unsightly, and substantially unsalable articles. The consumer was deceived and defrauded, and the use of sanitary enameled ironware lessened and its reputation depreciated by defective articles being palmed off on the consumer as not defective.

Wayman formed a scheme to use the patents as a vehicle for fixing prices. "That scheme was his. Th[e] purpose was merely to make money for himself by selling to the corporate defendants indulgences to sin against the Sherman act." Wayman organized what came to be known as the "Bathtub Trust." He licensed sixteen corporations, which became defendants in this suit along with officers of the corporate defendants. The license agreements provided for a running royalty, 80% of which would be rebated in three months if the licensee obeyed the terms of the agreement; if it did not, that 80% would be forfeited. As the lower court explained: "Each corporate defendant in this manner gave security that he would keep his bargain, or be good, as one of the licensees expressed it."

Each corporate defendant promised to do three things:

(1) It would not sell any "seconds" or "B's" (inferior products, such as bathtubs with defective enameling).
(2) "It would not sell any ware to any jobber who did not sign the jobber's resale agreement to be presently described."
(3) "It would not sell anybody any ware at a lower price or upon more attractive terms than those named in the agreement or in a schedule attached to it. This schedule named standard prices for each article of the ware and for each size, shape, and grade of that article."

The "jobber resale agreements," which each authorized jobber was required to sign, provided:

(1) "He could not buy any ware from anyone other than the corporate defendants."
(2) "He could not sell ware to anybody at a lower price or on more attractive terms than those named in the resale price lists."

Each jobber, like each manufacturer, had to "post bail"—"give cash security that he would carry out his bargain." There was a rebate system similar to that for the manufacturers: "If he had not cut prices and had not bought ware from anyone other than the corporate defendants, at the end of the calendar year, he was entitled to receive a rebate of 5 percent on the amount paid by him during the year." Nearly 400 jobbers signed these agreements. They constituted more than four-fifths of all the jobbers in the country. It was estimated that the annual sales to the licensed jobbers was more than $8 million, so that their annual rebates were more than $40,000—which they would receive only if they obeyed the agreements. "Moreover, the agreements told the jobbers in plain words that, if they cut prices or bought ware from anybody other than the corporate defendants, none of the latter would sell them again." "[T]he makers of nearly four-fifths of the ware and more than four out of every five dealers in it become parties to the combination."

The government brought a criminal suit in Detroit and a civil action in Baltimore. After there was a hung jury in the Detroit case, the government delayed its criminal case until final resolution of the civil action.

=== The civil action ===
The civil case was tried to a three-judge circuit court, which ruled for the government 2–1. The circuit court said that the case involved two important questions:

(1) Would such a combination as was attempted, and in large part brought about, have violated the Sherman act, had patents on automatic dredgers played no part in it?
(2) If it would, did the part played by those patents make lawful what otherwise would have been forbidden?

The defendants argued that "eyes illumined by the light of reason will see that what the defendants did was from the standpoint of the public interests good, and not evil." Before the formation of the Bathtub Trust: "the jobbers were making little profit on the ware"; "the ware was getting a bad reputation" from all the seconds on the market; "the public gained by what was done"; the public "suffers from the greed of the maker, the jobber, or the plumber, or of two or all of them" when they sell defective ware posing as good ware, but the public "will be in no danger from that greed when no one of them can any longer make any money by selling him a bad article for the price of a good." It is in the public interest to agree to suppress the sale of seconds, be "human nature being what it is, no other effective protection can be given." On the other hand, "if a enforceable bargain can be made that no goods shall be sold below a certain fixed price, which will yield a reasonable profit on a first-class article, jobbers and plumbers can be depended upon not to pay that price for an inferior article." The defendants pointed to what happened in 1911 when the government suit forced "the price-fixing provisions of the agreement [to be] suspended." As a result, "the market was at once flooded with low-grade ware." They argue: Much of it came from some of the corporate defendants. It may be better for the public to pay a higher price for better ware. Most individuals find that it is usually cheaper in the end."

The court said that those arguments could not resolve the matter because two questions still remain:

(1) "Does the law permit the additional price which the public is to pay to be fixed by a combination of dealers even if the latter do so, because they cannot in any other way keep some of their own number from selling bad ware for good?"
(2) "Has the experience of mankind led them to believe that to permit all the makers and dealers in articles of common use to combine to fix the prices and terms below which those goods may not be sold will tend in the long run to improve the quality of the goods?"

The government replied that "every agreement to fix prices and to force or bribe makers or dealers to maintain them is illegal." The court said:

These opposing contentions raise questions of great moment and of exceeding difficulty. To answer them wisely may require going to the very roots of our conceptions of what the relation of the state to the industrial life of its people should be.

But the Supreme Court has held that " a price agreement pure and simple is always illegal," and that "is conclusive here." So, to answer the first question, whether the agreements would have violated the Sherman Act "had the dredger patents had no part in them," the agreements fixed prices and that violates the Sherman Act. " In such case they cannot be taken out of the category of the unlawful by general reasoning as to their expediency or nonexpediency or the wisdom or want of wisdom of the statute which prohibited their being made.

The court then turned to the second question—whether the patents altered the case. The court maintained that a patentee "cannot use his patent rights to restrain trade in unpatented bath tubs." In such cases as the Button-Fastener case, patent tie-ins were held legitimate. But that is not the question in this case. "It would have been presented in this case had Wayman bargained with the corporate [192] defendants that they should buy all their enameling powder from him." That line of case law does not apply to price fixing based on tools to make an unpatented product: "The ownership of a patent for a tool by which old, well-known, and unpatented articles of general use can be more cheaply made gives no right to combine the makers and dealers in the unpatented articles in an agreement to make the public pay more for it.."

The circuit court therefore held that Wayman and the corporate defendants entered into "agreements or licenses attempt to fix the price of unpatented ware and to monopolize the trade in it" in violation of §§ 1 and 2 of the Sherman Act.

== Ruling of Supreme Court ==
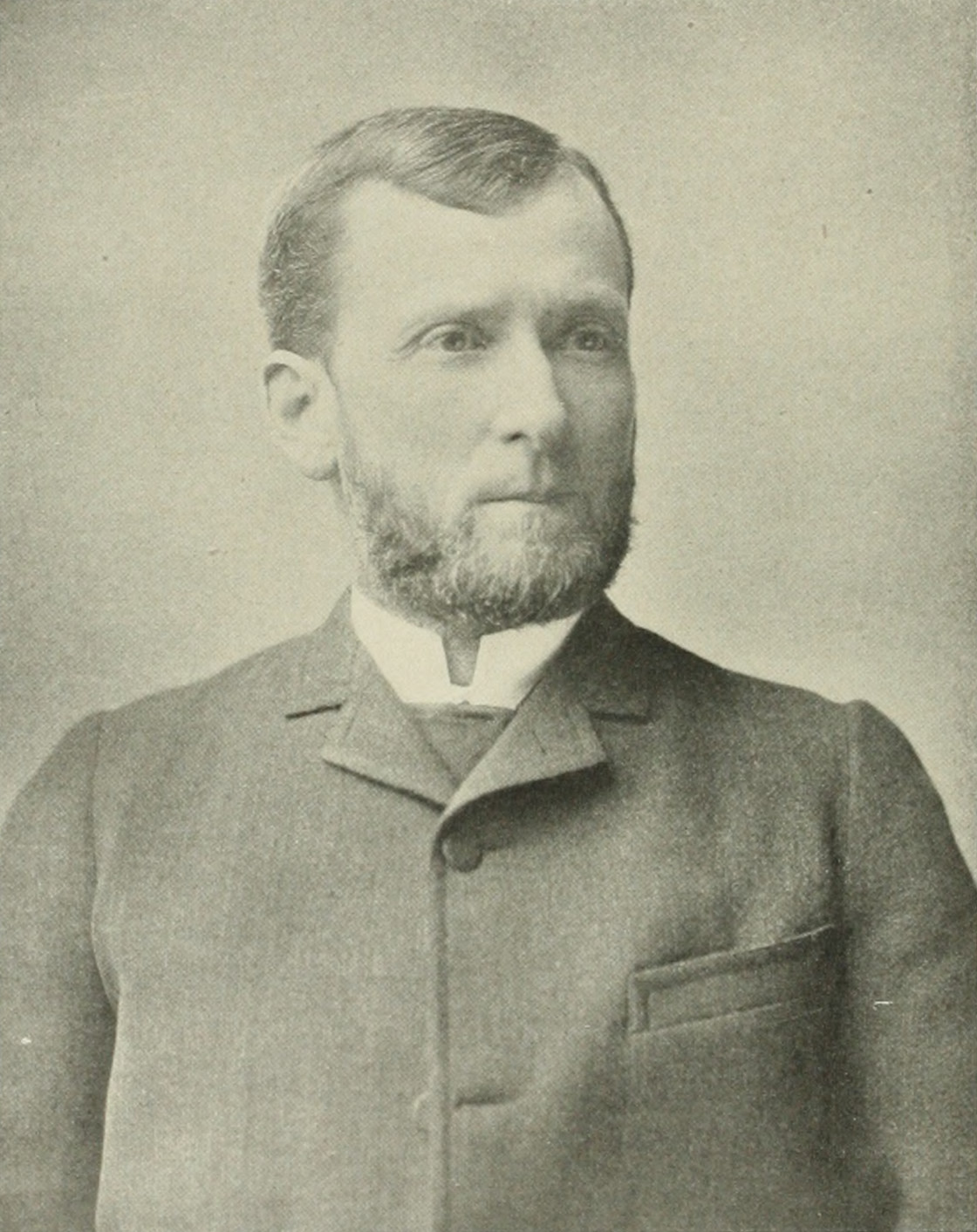
Justice Joseph McKenna delivered the opinion of the Court

Justice Joseph McKenna delivered the opinion of a unanimous Court.

The Supreme Court affirmed on somewhat different grounds from those of the circuit court. It did not rely on the patents' covering only a tool used to make an unpatented article, but trfeated the patents as if they covered the article sold. Initially, the Court put aside the government's contentions "that the Arrott patent was but a pretense, and that the agreements were put in the form of licenses of it to at once accomplish and palliate evasions of the law." Rather the Court assumed, arguendo, that the facts on this point was as the defendants contended and "we will consider the case from the standpoint of defendants' view of the situation." The defendants represented that Standard Sanitary was:

The dominant (it produced 50% of the articles) and the only honest manufacturer, pointing out to other manufacturers the worthlessness of their output, they not having the Arrott patent; also the dishonesty of their output, they putting out "seconds," the inferiority of which was "discernible only by experts," thereby defrauding the public, "discrediting the ware, and demoralizing the market and business." To avert these evil results, it is represented that the Standard was willing to forego the advantages which its ownership of the Arrott patent gave it and confer them upon the other manufacturers. But upon terms. "First and foremost," it was to be agreed that no "seconds" should be marketed. In the second place, a standard price must be agreed to so that henceforth rivalry should be "in the quality of the ware turned out at a uniform price, or in any other collateral inducement to the purchaser" that would not "affect the quality of the ware."

Even accepting that, the Court said, the picture that the defendants painted was incomplete:

What relation has the fixing of a price of the ware to the production of "seconds"? If the articles were made perfect, their price in compensation of them and by unfettered competition would adjust itself. To say otherwise would be in defiance of the examples of the trading and industrial world. Nor was a combination of manufacturers necessary to the perfection of manufacture and to rivalry in its quality. . . . But, granting that there was provision or security against the production of "seconds" in all of the articles, it seems from what we have said above that all of the substantial good which is asserted to have been the object of the agreements could have been attained by a simple sale of the right to use the Arrott patent, conceding to it the dominant effect which is attributed to it.

The Court pointed to the prohibition against selling to jobbers that did not join the combination, the prohibition against jobbers buying from unlicensed manufacturers, and the royalty with an 80% rebate that was forfeited if the licensee cut prices or dealt with an unauthorized jobber ("not inaptly termed in the argument, 'cash bail' "). The result of these arrangements was: "The trade was therefore practically controlled from producer to consumer, and the potency of the scheme was established by the cooperation of 85% of the manufacturers, and their fidelity to it was secured not only by trade advantages, but by what was practically a pecuniary penalty"—the cash bail. The Court concluded: "The agreements clearly therefore transcended what was necessary to protect the use of the patent or the monopoly which the law conferred upon it. They passed to the purpose and accomplished a restraint of trade condemned by the Sherman law."

The defendants claimed that their conduct was permissible under E. Bement & Sons v. National Harrow Co. and Henry v. A.B. Dick Co. The Court rejected the comparison. The case was like other combinations of manufacturers and dealers to fix prices, it said. "The added element of the patent in the case at bar cannot confer immunity from a like condemnation" under the antitrust laws:

And this we say without entering into the consideration of the distinction of rights for which the government contends between a patented article and a patented tool used in the manufacture of an unpatented article. Rights conferred by patents are indeed very definite and extensive, but they do not give any more than other rights a universal license against positive prohibitions. The Sherman law is a limitation of rights—rights which may be pushed to evil consequences, and therefore restrained. . . . Nor can they be evaded by good motives. The law is its own measure of right and wrong, of what it permits or forbids, and the judgment of the courts cannot be set up against it in a supposed accommodation of its policy with the good intention of parties, and, it may be, of some good results.

== Subsequent developments ==
=== Criminal case ===
The government had brought a parallel criminal case against the same defendants in the Eastern District of Michigan (Detroit). That case was tried after the civil case in Maryland and several months before the Supreme Court's decision in this case, and it resulted in a hung jury. U.S. Attorney General Wickersham postponed the new criminal trial until the Supreme Court resolved the civil case. The Nov. 18, 1912, announcement of the Supreme Court decision then paved the way for the retrial.

On retrial, the defendants were found guilty. The district court imposed fines ranging from $1 to $10,000 but rejected the Attorney General's argument that three of the defendants should serve jail time. Standard Sanitary received the highest fine, $10,000. The inventor Arrnott received a $1 fine.

== Commentary ==
Edwin Grosvenor, who prosecuted the Bathtub Trust case for the government, pointed out in a 1917 article in the Columbia Law Review that the Court did not choose to rest the case, as it could have done, on the narrow point that the government argued—that the restrictions were rested on a patented tool used to make the patented articles rather than a patent on the articles, and therefore the case did not involve a patent-based restraint. He emphasized that "the Court, in formulating a statement of the principles upon which the ruling was based, expressly refused to plant the decision on this narrow ground, but placed it upon the broad principle that rights conferred by patents, though extensive, do not give a universal license against positive prohibitions." Consequently, the case became more important as a precedent: "This decision has become the leading case on the subject of the relation of the patent law and Sherman law to each other. It has been cited five times by the Supreme Court, and has influenced the decision of at least eighteen reported cases in the lower federal courts.

Grosvenor also commented briefly on the economic impact in the aftermath of the case, in a 1913 issue of The Law Student's Helper, a Detroit publication:

The combination commenced operations in June, 1910. At once complaints poured into the Department of Justice. The Attorney-General commenced proceedings in July, 1910. Since the combination was broken up, the prices of the product have fallen from 25 to 40 percent, yet today nearly all the manufacturers engaged in the business are running their factories overtime and they are all making money at the reduced prices prevailing in this period of competition.
