= Button-Fastener case =

Heaton-Peninsular Button-Fastener Co. v. Eureka Specialty Co.
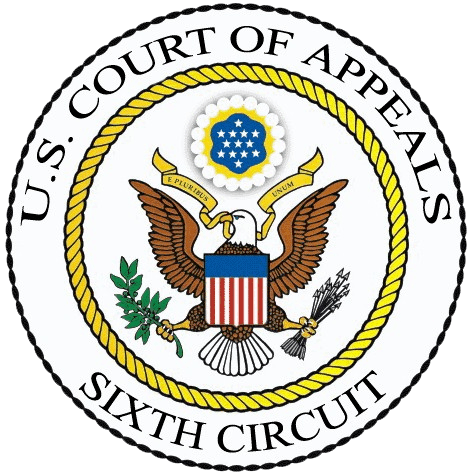
- Court: United States Court of Appeals for the Sixth Circuit
- Full case name: Heaton-Peninsular Button-Fastener Co. v. Eureka Specialty Co. et al.
- Decided: October 12, 1896
- Citation: 77 F. 288; 1896 U.S. App. LEXIS 2241

Case history
- Prior history: 65 F. 619, 1895 U.S. App. LEXIS 3022 (C.C.D. Mich. 1895)

Court membership
- Judges sitting: William Howard Taft, Horace Harmon Lurton, Eli Shelby Hammond

Case opinions
- Majority: Lurton, joined by a unanimous panel

The Button-Fastener Case, Heaton-Peninsular Button-Fastener Co. v. Eureka Specialty Co., also known as the Peninsular Button-Fastener Case, was for a time a highly influential decision of the United States Court of Appeals for the Sixth Circuit. Many courts of appeals, and the United States Supreme Court in the A.B. Dick case adopted its "inherency doctrine"—"the argument that, since the patentee may withhold his patent altogether from public use, he must logically and necessarily be permitted to impose any conditions which he chooses upon any use which he may allow of it." In 1917, however, the Supreme Court expressly overruled the Button-Fastener Case and the A.B. Dick case, in the Motion Picture Patents case.

== Background ==
Button-Fastener had patents on machines for fastening buttons to high-button shoes with staples. This was a labor-intensive operation formerly done by hand at a higher cost. The invention saved considerable labor in making the shoes, although commercially exploiting the invention presented a marketing problem. The machines were worth much more to high-volume users than to low-volume users since the labor-saving benefits were directly proportional to the number of shoes on which the machines fastened buttons. But if Button-Fastener tried to sell the machines at different prices to the different users, there would be problems. First, it would be difficult or impossible to determine in advance of sale how intensively each shoe manufacturer would use the machines. Second, if the machines were sold cheaply to low-volume users, it would have been difficult or impossible to prevent those buyers from reselling their machines to those manufacturers that "should" pay a high price. But Button-Fastener came up with a business model that solved the problem. It sold the machines subject to a condition spelled out in a plate fastened to each machine, that the machine must use only the staples that Button-Fastener made and sold. As it told the court in its legal papers, "it makes nothing in the sale of its machines, and ... the entire profits of its business are made in the sale of staples." In effect, the tie-in operated as a counter on the machines, counting the number of uses made of the invention. An above-market price for the staples provided a patent royalty proportional to use of the invention.

But the high price for staples attracted an interloper. Eureka Specialty Co. began to sell the staples, an unpatented product, to some machine users. According to Button-Fastener, Eureka persuaded Button-Fastener's customers to disobey the notices on the machines.

== Trial court opinion ==
Button-Fastener sued Eureka Specialty Co. for alleged infringement of its patents. In its pleadings, Button-Fastener described its business model of selling its patented machine only on condition that buyers of the machines obtain all their staples from Button-Fastener. It stated that notwithstanding its knowledge of this, Eureka "manufacture[d] staples adapted only for use in the machines so sold by [Button-Fastener], and persuade[d] the users of the machines to buy and use them in violation of the above-mentioned restriction."

Eureka responded to the suit with a "demurrer" in which it said (1) its only business is selling unpatented staples to people using the machines, for which "they are not accountable" to Button-Fastener, and (2) Button-Fastener's restriction on the use of the machines "whereby a monopoly in an unpatented article is secured to the complainant, is contrary to public policy, and that a court of equity will not enforce it."

The court dismissed the first argument, particularly because Button-Fastener alleged that Eureka actively "persuade[d] the users of the machines to violate the supposed rights secured to [Button-Fastener] by the patent, and the restriction in the sale of its machines." As to the second argument, however, the court agreed with Eureka, even though Button-Fastener submitted "a very able and ingenious argument ... to vindicate the general proposition that a patentee may deal with his patent as he likes and that the right is absolute." The court said that it was:

persuaded that the patentee's privilege has its limitations, in the rights and interests of the public, and that it is an abuse of his privilege to so shape his dealings with his patent as to secure a monopoly upon an unpatented article. It is hard to foresee to what extent such schemes might be carried if patents can practically be broadened so as to gather in a multitude of subjects now and always hitherto free from monopoly.

Button-Fastener argued that it, "having an absolute property right under its patent, might altogether refrain from putting its machines upon the market." The court said that if the patent owner did that, it [622] "would defeat the just expectation of the public, and would not be consistent with the implications of his grant," because "[t]he expectation is that he will promptly disclose the nature of his invention, and accord to the public, on reasonable terms, the use of it, and not that others should be shut out of that field for the period of 17 years, and the public be debarred from the benefits of like inventions during that whole period." In any case, the court said, "I think a court of equity would be slow in lending its aid to such a course." He said he would exercise his discretion to deny relief to Button-Fastener and therefore sustained Eureka's demurrer, dismissing the case.

== Sixth Circuit ruling ==
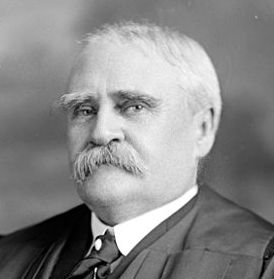
Judge (later Justice) Lurton authored the opinion in the Button-Fastener case

Button-Fastener appealed to the United States Court of Appeals for the Sixth Circuit. The panel included Judge Lurton (later Justice Horace Lurton), who wrote the opinion, and Judge William H. Taft (later the President and then the Chief Justice). The court unanimously reversed.

On appeal, Eureka "very earnestly and ably argued" that "the restrictions on use imposed by the complainant operate to create a monopoly in an unpatented article, and are therefore void as contrary to public policy, or, if valid as purely legal contracts, are so unconscionable as not to entitle complainant to equitable remedies for their enforcement."

The court acknowledged that it is the general rule that sale terminates the seller's rights over a sold article, as in Adams v. Burke. But the rule is different, the court said, when the sale is made subject to a condition. In this case, the court maintained:

In view of the conspicuous character of both the machine and the notice permanently affixed thereon, every one buying must be conclusively presumed to have notice that the owners of the patents intended by the inscription on the machine to grant only a restricted license for its use, and it is difficult to see why such purchaser is not to be regarded as acquiring and accepting the structure subject to this restriction.

Accordingly, the buyer does not acquire full rights over the purchased article:

The buyer of a machine undoubtedly obtains title to the materials embodying the invention, subject to reverter in case of violation of the conditions of the sale. But, as to the right to use the invention, he is obviously a mere licensee, having no interest in the monopoly granted by the letters patent. A license operates only as a waiver of the monopoly as to the licensee, and estops the licensor from exercising its prohibitory powers in derogation of the privileges conferred by him upon the licensee.

That is, the sale of a patented machine may convey title to the pieces of metal and other material comprising the machine, but not a complete right to use the machine in any way the buyer chooses. Since the buyer acquired only a limited and conditional right to use the machine, i.e., a right to use it with the seller's staples, any other use is outside the scope of the license granted to the buyer.

On the other hand, the machine buyer who uses Eureka's staples is an infringer:

[A] use prohibited by the license is a use in defiance of the monopoly reserved by the patentee, and necessarily an unlawful invasion of the rights secured to him by his patent. The license would be no defense to a suit for infringement by a use in excess of its terms. The patentee has the exclusive right of use, except in so far as he has parted with it by his license. The essence of the monopoly conferred by the grant of letters patent is the exclusive right to use the invention or discovery described in the patent. This exclusive right of use is a true and absolute monopoly and is granted in derogation of the common right, and this right to monopolize the use of the invention or discovery is the substantial property right conferred by law, and which the public is under obligation to respect and protect.

Lurton then turned to the public policy arguments—that Button-Fastener was expanding its lawful monopoly over the patented machines to a second monopoly over unpatented staples:

What we are asked to do is to mark another boundary line around the patentee's monopoly, which will debar him from engrossing the market for an article not the subject of a patent. To do this, we are asked to say that he cannot license others to use his invention on condition that they shall use it only in conjunction with a nonpatentable article made by himself. The only reason suggested for this limitation upon his right to define the terms upon which others may use his invention is that a monopoly in the unpatented article may thereby be created. Upon what authority are we to circumscribe the exercise of the privileges awarded a patentee? In considering any question in respect of restraints upon the liberty of contracting, imposed by principles of public policy, we should bear in mind that very high considerations of public policy are involved in the recognition of a wide liberty in the making of contracts.

The court said that freedom of contract trumps public policy here because of the inherent rights of a patent owner:

If he see fit, he may reserve to himself the exclusive use of his invention or discovery. If he will neither use his device, nor permit others to use it, he has but suppressed his own. That the grant is made upon the reasonable expectation that he will either put his invention to practical use, or permit others to avail themselves of it upon reasonable terms, is doubtless true. This expectation is based alone upon the supposition that the patentee's interest will induce him to use, or let others use, his invention. The public has retained no other security to enforce such expectations. A suppression can endure but for the life of the patent, and the disclosure he has made will enable all to enjoy the fruit of his genius. His title is exclusive, and so clearly within the constitutional provisions in respect of private property that he is neither bound to use his discovery himself, nor permit others to use it.

Since the patentee has such absolute, inherent rights to withhold use of the patent, he could lawfully use that right to become the sole supplier of the article that the patent covers:

If the patentee choose to reserve to himself the exclusive use of his device, and the invention be of a wide character, and so radical as to enable him to make and sell an unpatentable product cheaper than any other competitor, a practical monopoly of the market for that article will result; and yet no one could say that a monopoly thus secured was illegitimate, or obnoxious to public policy.

To illustrate: Let it be supposed that the patents owned by this complainant were of so wide a character as to cheapen the process of manufacturing shoes, and to drive from competition all other modes of manufacture. Then suppose the patentees were of opinion that they could most profitably enjoy their inventions by retaining the monopoly of the use and engaging in the manufacture of shoes.

If content to undersell all others, they could engross the market for shoes, to the extent of their capacity to supply the demand during the life of their patents, or so long as their invention was not superseded by subsequent inventions still further cheapening the cost of manufacture. The monopoly thus secured would be the legitimate consequence of the meritorious character of their invention. Yet just such monopolies may result whenever a new and surprising advance is made in some art of wide and general use. The great consuming public would be benefited, rather than injured, for the monopoly could endure so long only as shoes were supplied at a less price than had prevailed before the invention.

This logic can be extended, Lurton insisted, from shoes to button-fastener staples:

Now, if the patentees, by retaining to themselves the exclusive use of their invention, are able, legitimately and lawfully, to acquire a monopoly of the manufacture of shoes, and destroy the shoe market for those who before had shared it, why may they not, by a system of restricted licenses, permit others to use their devices on condition that only some minor part of the shoe—the pegs, the tips, the thread, or the buttons, or the button fasteners—shall be bought from them?
If these concessions were such as to enable others to compete, though their use of the mechanism was restricted by the terms of the license, who could justly complain, if the inventors, content with a monopoly of the market for the article named in their license, surrendered the opportunity for a monopoly of the manufacture of the complete shoe? The device protected by the patents owned by complainant is of no such wide or radical character as that used for purposes of illustration. Yet there is no appreciable difference in the legal principles applicable to the supposed facts used for illustration, and those stated on the face of the complainant's bill.

The court explained that any harm to competitive staple makers that may occur is not due to the conduct of the patentee but rather to the merit of the invention:

The fact which has affected the makers of wire staples for shoe manufacturing is the invention of a machine which, by its simplicity, superior capabilities, its cheapness and accuracy, has practically driven all other methods of fastening buttons to shoes out of use. The older and clumsier methods, on the allegations of the bill, have been completely superseded. From this invention there results a large market for wire staples, adapted in size and shape to use with the new mechanism, and a second consequence is the complete cessation of the demand for button fasteners not adapted to be used with complainant's machine.

The court explained that the patent holder's purpose was merely to adjust the payment made for use of the invention to the value of the benefit conferred:

The inventions covered by complainant's patents are not of such character as to enable them, by retaining the exclusive use, to absorb either the making of shoes, or the minor work of fastening buttons to shoes. In the exercise of the right of exclusive use, they have put on the market a structure embodying their devices, and licensed the purchaser to use the invention "only with staples" made by themselves.

In other words, they have chosen to fix the price for the right of use [of the invention] at the profit resulting from the sale of staples. As observed by counsel for complainant, "The fasteners are thus made the counters by which the royalty proportioned to the actual use of the machine is determined."
This method of licensing their mechanism may or may not result in the engrossment of the market for staples. So long as their invention controls the market for button-fastening appliances, and to the extent that their machines shall supersede other modes of clinching staples, just so long will they be enabled to control the market for staples. Their monopoly in an unpatented article will depend upon the merit of their patented device, and the extent to which other clinching devices are superseded by it. In the last analysis, the invention destroyed the demand for sizes and shapes of staples not adapted to use with the machine of complainant.

. . . The monopoly in the unpatented staple results as an incident from the monopoly in the use of complainant's invention, and is therefore a legitimate result of the patentee's control over the use of his invention by others. Depending, as such a monopoly would, upon the merits of the invention to which it is a mere incident, it is neither obnoxious to public policy, nor an illegal restraint of trade.

Since the machine purchasers who use Eureka staples infringe the patent, "it would seem to follow that the defendants, who aid and abet such infringement by intentionally and maliciously persuading and inducing the licensees of such machines to exceed their licenses, and by furnishing them with the means for such infringement are themselves infringers, and liable as tortfeasors."

== Subsequent events ==
In 1912, in Henry v. A.B. Dick Co. the Supreme Court endorsed, reaffirmed, and adopted the reasoning of the Button-Fastener case. In an endnote, the Court collected citations to the many lower court opinions that had followed the Button-Fastener precedent between 1896 and 1912.

In 1917, the Supreme Court overruled the A.B. Dick and Button-Fastener cases in Motion Picture Patents Co. v. Universal Film Mfg. Co.,

In 1992, in Mallinckrodt, Inc. v. Medipart, Inc., the Federal Circuit revived the doctrine of the Button-Fastener case, at least partially. The court held that the patent exhaustion doctrine did not apply when a patentee sold a patented product subject to a condition other than a price fix or tie in, unless "the patentee has ventured beyond the patent grant and into behavior having an anticompetitive effect not justifiable under the rule of reason." Despite the sweeping language of cases such as Motion Picture Patents Co. v. Universal Film Mfg. Co., the court held that the Supreme Court had only held post-sale restrictions invalid in price-fixing and tie-in cases, and therefore the general language outlawing post-sale restrictions was merely obiter dicta that could be ignored.

The Federal Circuit reaffirmed this doctrine in 2016 in Lexmark Int'l, Inc. v. Impression Prods., Inc., and Impression petitioned for certiorari. The Supreme Court has invited the Solicitor General to file a brief expressing the views of the United States. In October 2016, the government filed the requested amicus curiae brief. It recommended grant of certiorari on both questions. The brief argues that the "Federal Circuit's decision misreads" the Supreme Court's precedents and "would substantially erode the exhaustion doctrine." On December 2, 2016, the Supreme Court granted certiorari.

== Commentary ==
● In 1912, New York lawyer Gilbert H. Montague praised the Button-Fastener case as "this masterly decision" and "the foundation of the recent decision of the Supreme Court in Henry v. A.B. Dick Co.", in the Yale Law Journal. He asserted that Lurton's opinion demolished the argument that the patentee was obtaining a practical monopoly of the market for unpatentable staples, previously an ordinary article of commerce:

The court disposed of this objection by showing that such "practical monopoly," far from offending public policy, actually promotes the general welfare, because the patentees can attain it only "by cheapening the cost of manufacture," and can continue it only "so long as their invention was not superseded by subsequent inventions still further cheapening the cost of manufacture." So cogent is the reasoning of the Court that it deserves careful attention.

Montague also praised A.B. Dick, in which Lurton continued his development of the inherency doctrine: "Not since the creation of the patent system," Montague declared, "has the Supreme Court rendered a better considered decision affecting patent rights."

Montague argued in favor of the "counting mechanism" argument that Button-Fastener's counsel made to justify the tie-in of staples, which was later taken up by Chicago School analysts to justify any tie-in which patented devices are used in variable proportion to output results:

In the case of innumerable patented machines, no accurate or convenient measure of the amount of use and output is afforded, except by measuring the supplies used in connection, with the machine. By requiring the user of the patented article to obtain such material from a single source, the patent owner, insures the means of accurately, inexpensively and conveniently measuring the amount of use and output of the patented article, and collecting the royalty so determined, by charging for such supplies a sum sufficient to cover their cost, and also an additional amount in the nature of a royalty for the use of the patented article. As regards many patented articles, which otherwise could be sold only in small numbers, at a large outright purchase price, no other means of determining a royalty, based upon the amount of use and output, can be devised.

Montague also contended that the tie-in was justifiable because it permitted users to pay for use of the invention as they exploited it rather than entirely up front: "Under such an arrangement, the money burden upon the licensee does not fall upon him all at one time, like the necessity of paying at the outset a large purchase price, but is distributed over a period sufficient to enable him to derive, from the use of the patented article, the means of compensating the patent owner."

● In 1942, patent lawyer Giles Rich (as he then was, later Judge Rich of the Federal Circuit) commented on the Button-Fastener case. He pointed to the passage in the opinion in which Judge Lurton said that public policy was no issue because the patentee created the market for the staples. Judge Lurton said (as quoted by Rich):

The fact which has affected the makers of wire staples for shoe manufacturing is the invention of a machine which, by its simplicity, superior capabilities, its cheapness and accuracy, has practically driven all other methods of fastening buttons to shoes out of use. . . . From this invention there results a large market for wire staples. . . . The monopoly in the unpatented staples results [according to this decision] as an incident from the monopoly iii the use of complainant's invention, and is therefore a legitimate result of the patentee's control over the use of his invention by others. Depending, as such monopoly would, upon the merits of the invention to which it is a mere incident, it is neither obnoxious to public policy, nor an illegal restraint of trade.

Rich commented:

The conclusion to be drawn from this is that Judge Lurton held to the economic theory that one who creates a market should be allowed to engross it. Such is not now nor ever has been a policy adhered to or sanctioned by any American government, so far as we know. It certainly was never a part of any statute passed in furtherance of the Constitutional purpose "to promote the progress of science and useful arts," either expressly or by implication.

Rich also criticized the notion of using the staples tie-in as a counting device, based on the theory of selling the machine but not its use—reserving the latter with a license bearing a running royalty. Rich commented (seemingly sarcastically), "It was indeed a great mind that conceived the idea of making the purchaser of anything pay the one who sold it to him a royalty according to the amount of its use, by separating the right to use from ownership and renaming the purchaser 'licensee.' "
