= Henry v. A.B. Dick Co. =

- Supreme Court of the United States

Argued October 27, 1911 Decided March 11, 1912
- Full case name: Henry v. A.B. Dick Co.
- Citations: 224 U.S. 1 (more) 32 S. Ct. 364; 56 L. Ed. 645; 1912 U.S. LEXIS 2279

Case history
- Prior: A.B. Dick Co. v. Henry, 149 F. 424 (C.C.S.D.N.Y. 1907).

Holding
- Patent owners can prescribe requirements to how licensees may use their patented invention. Selling a product that knowingly contravenes one of those restrictions is contributory infringement of the patent.

Court membership
- Chief Justice Edward D. White Associate Justices Joseph McKenna · Oliver W. Holmes Jr. William R. Day · Horace H. Lurton; Charles E. Hughes · Willis Van Devanter; Joseph R. Lamar

Case opinions
- Majority: Lurton, joined by McKenna, Holmes, Van Devanter
- Dissent: White, joined by Hughes, Lamar
- Day, Harlan took no part in the consideration or decision of the case.
- Overruled by
- Motion Picture Patents Co. v. Universal Film Mfg. Co.

Henry v. A.B. Dick Co., 224 U.S. 1 (1912), was a 1912 United States Supreme Court case which held that a patent owner could impose conditions on the use of a patented product even after its sale—therefore individuals who knowingly violated, or aided others in violating, these conditions could be held liable for contributory infringement of said patent. In 1917, the Supreme Court overruled Henry v. A.B. Dick Co. in Motion Picture Patents Co. v. Universal Film Mfg. Co.

== Background ==
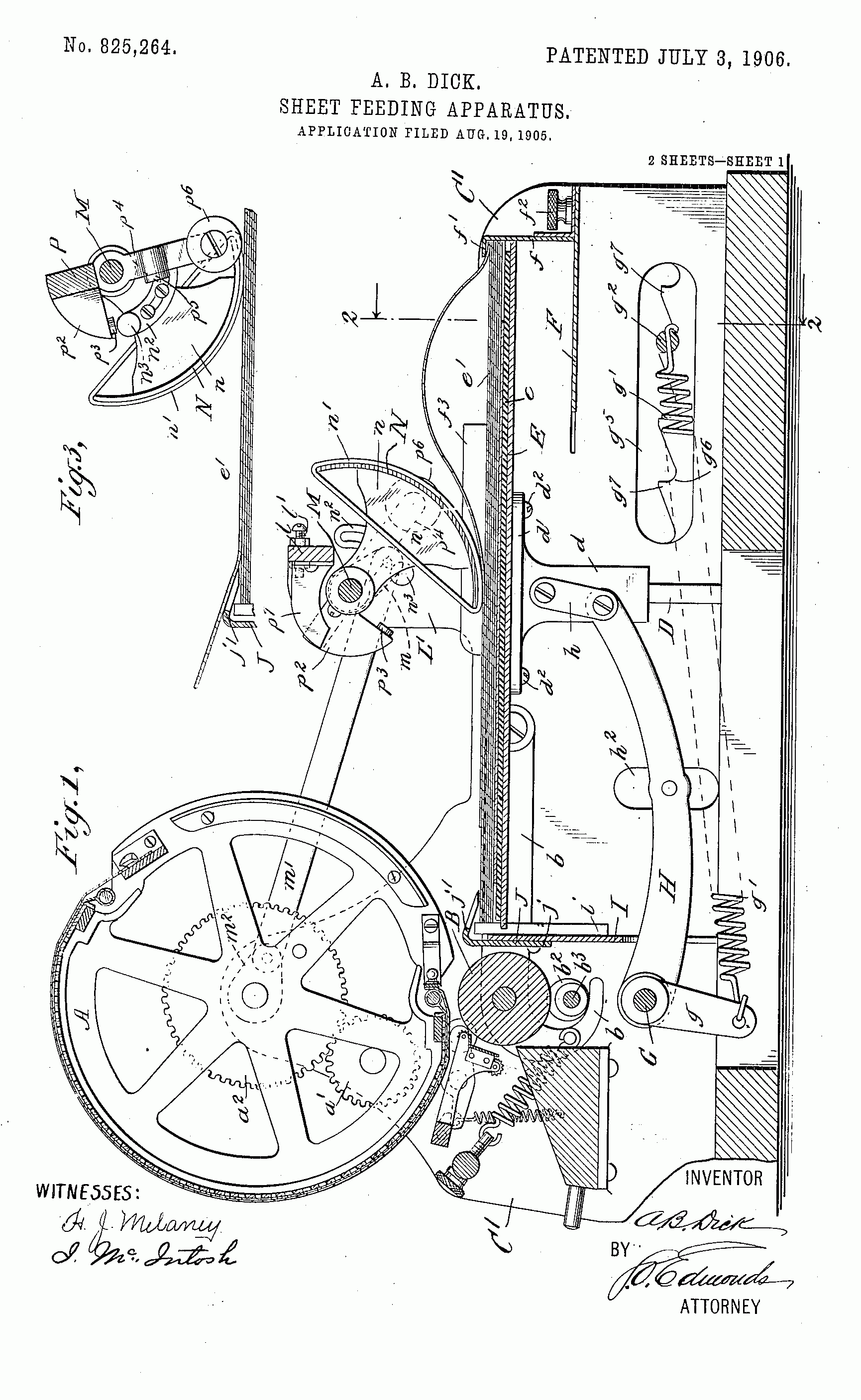
Patented Rotary Mimeograph machine of A.B. Dick Co.

A.B. Dick owned a patent on a mimeograph machine, which was designed to print multiple paper copies of papers by exuding ink through apertures in a stencil onto paper sheets. Dick sold one of the patented machines to Miss Christina B. Skou. A plate had been fastened to the machine, reading that the machine was "sold by the A.B. Dick Company with the license restriction that it may be used only with the stencil, paper, ink, and other supplies made by A. B. Dick." Sidney Henry then sold to Miss Skou a can of ink suitable for use upon the mimeograph machine, with knowledge of the license agreement, and with the expectation that she would use the ink with the machine.

A.B. Dick then sued Henry in the circuit court for the Southern District of New York, which ruled in favor of Dick. The Second Circuit certified to the Supreme Court the question whether the conduct constituted patent infringement.

== Ruling of Supreme Court ==
The Court ruled (4-3) that Henry's conduct was contributory infringement, in a decision written by Justice Lurton, joined by Justices McKenna, Holmes, and Van Devanter. Chief Justice Edward White, joined by Justices Hughes and Lamar, dissented. (Two justices were unavailable: Justice Harlan had died and Justice Day was absent.).

=== Majority opinion ===
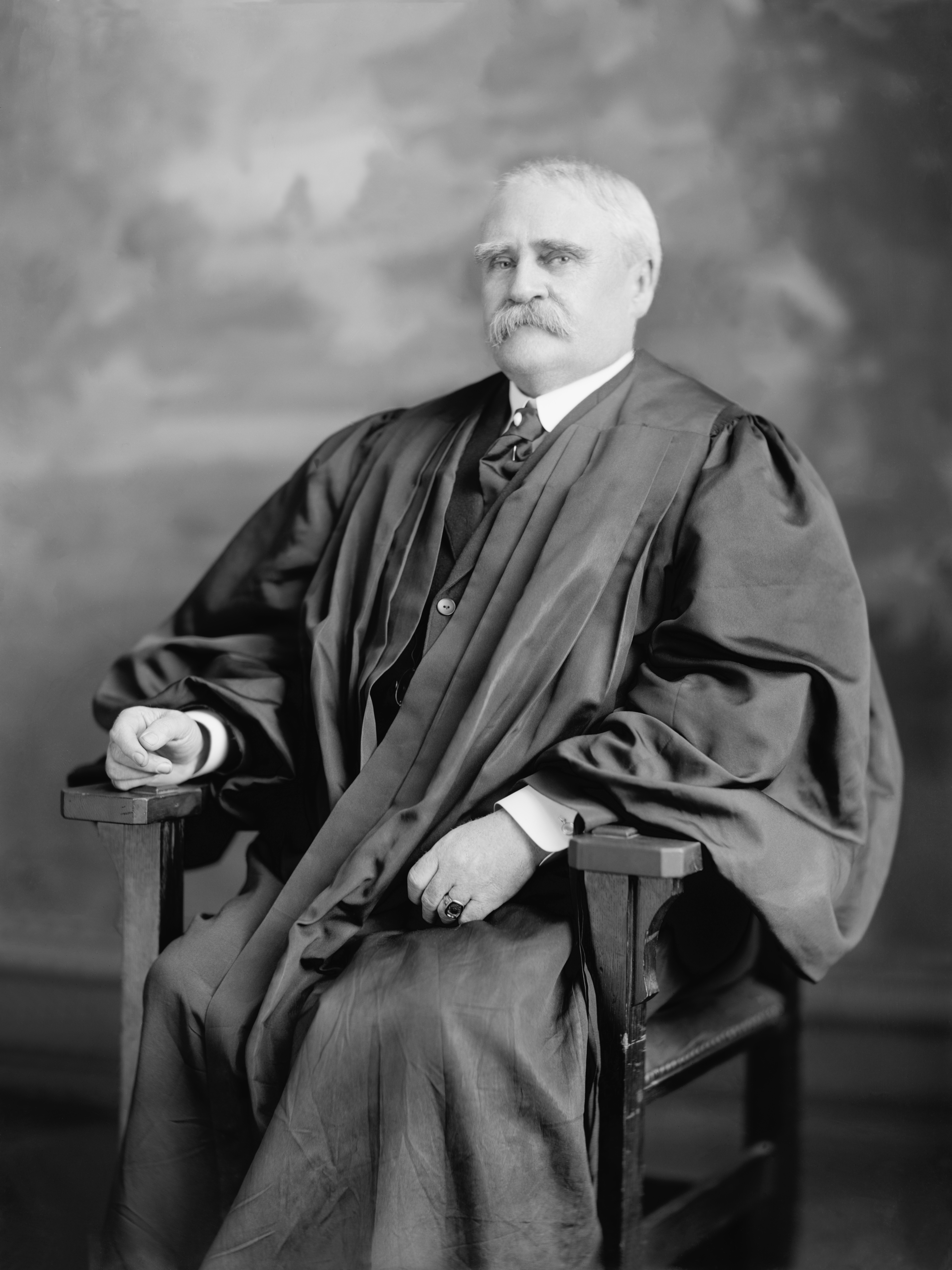
Justice Lurton

Justice Lurton noted preliminarily that Henry could not be guilty of contributory infringement unless Skou was guilty of direct infringement in using Henry's ink. "It is not denied that she accepted the machine with notice of the conditions under which the patentee consented to its use. Nor is it denied that thereby she agreed not to use the machine otherwise." The only issue was whether breach of the agreement to use only Dick's ink was patent infringement. Henry argued that the exhaustion doctrine prevented such a post-sale restriction from being enforceable. "He cannot make a sale with the condition attached that the article shall be used or disposed of in a certain manner, leaving the title, however, in the purchaser in case of a breach of the condition."

The majority said that principle applied only to unconditional sales. This machine was sold subject to the condition that it must be used only with Dick's ink. "But if the right of use be confined by specific restriction, the use not permitted is necessarily reserved to the patentee. If that reserved control of use of the machine be violated, the patent is thereby invaded. This right to sever ownership and use is deducible from the nature of a patent monopoly, and is recognized in the cases."

The Court dismissed Henry's arguments that holding the licensing restrictions permissible would lead to great harm to the public:

For the purpose of testing the consequence of a ruling which will support the lawfulness of a sale of a patented machine for use only its connection with supplies necessary for its operation, bought from the patentee, many fanciful suggestions of conditions which might be imposed by a patentee have been pressed upon us. Thus, it is said that a patentee of a coffee pot might sell on condition that it be used only with coffee bought from him, or, if the article be a circular saw, that it might be sold on condition that it be used only in sawing logs procured from him. These and other illustrations are used to indicate that this method of marketing a patented article may be carried to such an extent as to inconvenience the public and involve innocent people in unwitting infringements.

But these illustrations all fail of their purpose, because the public is always free to take or refuse the patented article on the terms imposed. If they be too onerous or not in keeping with the benefits, the patented article will not find a market.

The majority capped this argument by pointing out that under U.S. law the inventor may decline to exploit his patented invention and yet he can refuse to let others use it during the life of the patent, because that is his inherent right under our patent system:

This larger right embraces the lesser of permitting others to use upon such terms as the patentee chooses to prescribe. It must not be forgotten that we are dealing with a constitutional and statutory monopoly. . . . And if it be that the ingenuity of patentees in devising ways in which to reap the benefit of their discoveries requires to be restrained, Congress alone has the power to determine what restraints shall be imposed. As the law now stands, it contains none, and the duty which rests upon this and upon every other court is to expound the law as it is written. Arguments based upon suggestions of public policy not recognized in the patent laws are not relevant. The field to which we are invited by such arguments is legislative, not judicial.

=== Dissenting opinion ===
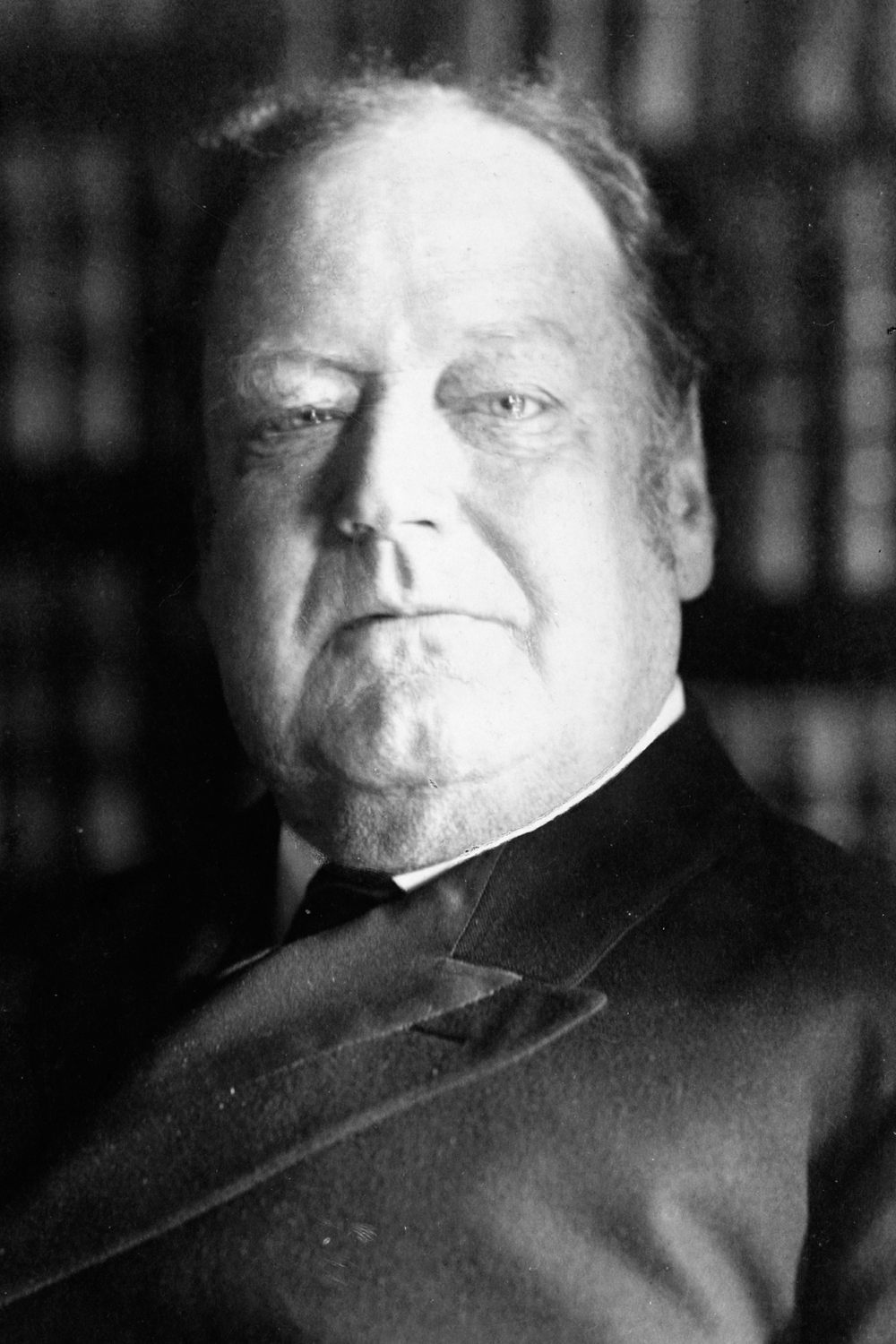
Chief Justice White

Chief Justice White expressed his "forebodings as to the evil consequences to result from the application of the construction now given to the patent statute" if Congress failed "to amend the statute so as to avoid such evils." He strongly objected to the doctrine "that a patentee, in selling the machine covered by his patent, has power by contract to extend the patent so as to cause it to embrace things which it does not include; in other words, to exercise legislative power of a far-reaching and dangerous character. This occurs, he said, because "the ruling now made in effect is that the patentee has the power, by contract, to extend his patent rights so as to bring within the claims of his patent things which are not embraced therein, thus virtually legislating by causing the patent laws to cover subjects to which, without the exercise of the right of contract, they could not reach."

White then listed a catalog of dangerous results of the ruling:

- Take a patentee selling a patented engine. He will now have the right by contract to bring under the patent laws all contracts for coal or electrical energy used to afford power to work the machine, or even the lubricants employed in its operation.
- Take a patented carpenter's plane. The power now exists in the patentee by contract to validly confine a carpenter purchasing one of the planes to the use of lumber sawed from trees grown on the land of a particular person, or sawed by a particular mill.
- Take a patented cooking utensil. The power is now recognized in the patentee to bind by contract one who buys the utensil to use in connection with it no other food supply but that sold or made by the patentee.
- Take the invention of a patented window frame. It is now the law that the seller of the frame may stipulate that no other material shall be used in a house in which the window frames are placed except such as may be bought from the patentee and seller of the frame.
- Take an illustration which goes home to everyone—a patented sewing machine. It is now established that, by putting on the machine, in addition to the notice of patent required by law, a notice called a license restriction, the right is acquired, as against the whole world, to control the purchase by users of the machine of thread, needles, and oil lubricants or other materials convenient or necessary for operation of the machine.

White explained that these evils were not imaginary but were already becoming prevalent, as a result of the widespread following that had attached to the Sixth Circuit's decision in the Button-Fastener case:

The illustrations might be multiplied indefinitely. That they are not imaginary is now a matter of common knowledge, for, as the result of a case the Button-Fastener case decided some years ago by one of the circuit courts of appeal, which has been followed by cases in other circuit courts of appeal, to which reference will hereafter be made, what prior to the first of those decisions on a sale of a patented article was designated a condition of sale, governed by the general principles of law, has come in practice to be denominated a license restriction. ... As the transformation has come about in practice since the decisions in question, the conclusion is that it is attributable as an effect caused by the doctrine of those cases. And, as I have previously stated, it is a matter of common knowledge that the change has been frequently resorted to for the purpose of bringing numerous articles of common use within the monopoly of a patent when otherwise they would not have been embraced therein, thereby tending to subject the whole of society to a widespread and irksome monopolistic control.

White argued that this legal development was contrary to the exhaustion doctrine on which many earlier Supreme Court cases had been based, including Adams v. Burke. White maintained that the Button-Fastener case and the court of appeals decisions following it were all wrongly decided and should be overruled. "[T]he Button-Fastener case and the confusion which has followed the application of the ruling made in that case was but the consequence of failing to observe the difference between the rights of a patentee which were protected by the patent and those which arose from contract, and therefore were subject alone to the general law."

== Subsequent developments ==
Partially in response to the A.B. Dick decision, Congress enacted Section 3 of the Clayton Act in 1914. Section 3 prohibits the use of conditions in leases or sales or contracts for sale that prevent the lessee or purchaser from using or dealing in the goods of a competitor of the lessor or seller, if the condition may substantially lessen competition or tend to create a monopoly.

Two Supreme Court decisions failed to follow or distinguish A.B. Dick in 1912 and 1913 but did not overrule it.

The A.B. Dick case was overruled in 1917 in Motion Picture Patents Co. v. Universal Film Mfg. Co., The A.B. Dick case's reasoning that a sale on condition (i.e., the product was sold subject to a restriction on its use) was not within the exhaustion doctrine was revived in the Federal Circuit in Mallinckrodt, Inc. v. Medipart, Inc. That case apparently was overruled sub silentio in Quanta Computer, Inc. v. LG Electronics, Inc. However, an en banc decision of the Federal Circuit refused to overrule Mallinckrodt and instead reaffirmed it. A certiorari petition is now pending in that case.

== Commentary ==
In 1917, when the Motion Picture Patents case overruled A.B., Dick and the Button-Fastener case, a commentator remarked:

It by no means follows that because a patentee may withhold the use of the patented article entirely he may license its use with any conditions he chooses. It may be better that the public should not enjoy the article at all than that it should be used under restrictions obnoxious to public policy.

In 2011, Professor Vincent Chiapetta explained this point in greater detail. He concluded that the inherency doctrine ignores the issue of whether the benefits of increased usage of the patented invention under a restrictive license exceed the harms resulting from the restriction. A proper legal analysis, Chiapetta argues, must balance benefits against harms.

The A.B. Dick case has been called "the high-water mark of judicial deference toward patentees."
