= National Lockwasher Co. v. George K. Garrett Co. =

American patent law

- Court: United States Court of Appeals for the Third Circuit
- Full case name: National Lockwasher Co. v. George K. Garrett Co.
- Argued: April 19, 1943
- Decided: July 13, 1943
- Citations: 137 F.2d 255; 58 U.S.P.Q. 460

Case history
- Subsequent history: Rehearing denied, September 2, 1943.

Court membership
- Judges sitting: Albert Branson Maris, Herbert Funk Goodrich, James Cullen Ganey

Case opinions
- Majority: Goodrich, joined by a unanimous panel

Laws applied
- Clayton Act, 15 U.S.C. § 14

National Lockwasher Co. v. George K. Garrett Co., 137 F.2d 255 (3d Cir. 1943), is one of the earliest or the earliest federal court decision to hold that it is patent misuse for a patentee to require licensees not to use a competitive technology. Such provisions are known as "tie-outs."

== Background ==
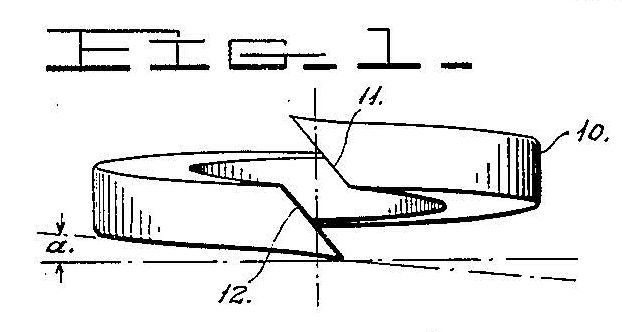
Drawing of lock washer involved in National Lockwasher v. Garrett – from patent

National Lockwasher owned U.S. Patent 1,655,018, which covered split-ring, compression-spring lock washers with a construction preventing them from interlinking with one another when handled in bulk. The washer accomplishes this by making the helical ring-shaped washer extend more than 360 degrees in circumference, cutting the ends of the washer so that the end faces make an angle with the top and bottom faces of the washer, and making the spaces between the ends of the washer smaller than the thickness of the washer stock but large enough to allow compression to flatten the washer. (If the space is smaller than the thickness (cross-section height) of the washer stock, one washer cannot pass through the end space of another washer and entangle it.) A lock washer is used to prevent a screw, bolt, or nut from loosening under vibration. It operates as a spring under compression having sufficient elasticity to neutralize the play between the assembled parts that vibration causes.

National licensed five other washer manufacturers under the patent. Each license "contained a provision to the effect that the licensee agrees, while the agreement is in force, that it will not manufacture any other form of non-tangling spring washers except those covered by the patent in suit." There are other forms of non-tangling spring washers on the market, which use different technology from that of the patent.

The district court found that Garrett infringed the patent, that it was valid, and directed an accounting. A judgment of $18,000 was entered. Garrett appealed to the court of appeals.

== Ruling of Third Circuit ==
"So what we have here," the court said, "is a patentee who gives a license to a manufacturer for a stipulated consideration, part of the consideration being that the licensee will abstain from manufacturing any other kind of nontangling spring washer except those covered by the license."

The court recognized that this case was different on its facts from the Supreme Court's prior tie-in patent misuse cases such as Morton Salt Co. v. G.S. Suppiger Co., in which the Court held that a patentee "may not claim protection of his grant by the courts where it is being used to subvert" patent policy. The patentee is not imposing a tie-in, but it is "using its patent monopoly to suppress the manufacture of possible competing goods not covered by its patent." The patentee:

is attempting by means other than that of free competition to extend the bounds of its lawful monopoly to make, use and vend the patented device to the extent where such device would be the only one available to a user of such an article. This monopoly is obviously not covered by the patent. A patentee's right does not extend to the use of the patent to purge the market of competing non-patented goods except, of course, through the process of fair competition.

This conduct brought the case within the principle of United States v. Univis Lens Co., "which limits the granted monopoly strictly to the terms of the statutory grant." Accordingly: "The patentee has disentitled itself to recover at present for infringement by reason of its utilization of its patent monopoly to drive unpatented competing goods from the market."

== Subsequent developments ==
The Lockwasher case was followed by courts in several other circuits. In 2010, the Federal Circuit ruled, however, that similar conduct is not misuse. A 2015 decision of the Supreme Court may call into question the Federal Circuit's decision in that case.

=== Berlenbach and McCullough ===
In Berlenbach v. Anderson and Thompson Ski Co., the Ninth Circuit upheld a dismissal of a complaint for patent misuse. The offending license provided that the licensee "shall not manufacture or distribute in the United States and Canada any other safety type or automatic releasing ski binding other than" the patented one.

Earlier, in McCullough v. Kammerer Corp., the Ninth Circuit condemned a license that provided that the licensee could not "manufacture or use or rent any device which will be in competition with the device or devices covered by this license agreement." The Ninth Circuit held it improper to "extend[ ] the monopoly of the patent by suppressing the manufacture or use of competitive devices, patented or unpatented."

=== Columbus ===
In Columbus Auto. Corp. v. Oldberg Mfg. Co., the Tenth Circuit affirmed a patent misuse ruling against a license providing that "For the duration of this contract, [licensee] agrees not to manufacture, sell or dispose of any other shock absorber which is competitive with the shock absorbers covered by said Patents."

=== Lasercomb ===
In Lasercomb America, Inc. v. Reynolds, a copyright misuse case, the Fourth Circuit found misuse where the plaintiff copyright owner licensed its computer-assisted die-making software with agreements that forbade the licensee from permitting its personnel "to write, develop, produce or sell [competing] computer assisted die making software."

=== Princo ===
However, in Princo Corp. v. ITC, the Federal Circuit ruled that an alleged conspiracy to suppress competing technology of another patent was not patent misuse:

[T]he alleged act of patent misuse . . . was the claimed horizontal agreement between Philips and Sony to restrict the availability of the Lagadec patent—an entirely different patent that was never asserted in the infringement action against Princo. Even if such an agreement were shown to exist, and even if it were shown to have anticompetitive effects, a horizontal agreement restricting the availability of Sony's Lagadec patent would not constitute misuse of Philips's Raaymakers patents or any of Philips's other patents in suit.

Judge Bryson explained that "the question in this case comes down to this: When a patentee offers to license a patent, does the patentee misuse that patent by inducing a third party not to license its separate, competitive technology?" No precedent so holds, he insisted, and it did not fit within the requirement for misuse that the Philips-Sony agreement "have the effect of increasing the physical or temporal scope of the patent in suit."

The 2015 decision of the Supreme Court in Kimble v. Marvel Entertainment, LLC, however, may call the soundness of Princo into question. The Kimble Court firmly rejected efforts to assimilate the patent misuse doctrine to antitrust law and explained in some detail the different policies at work in the two bodies of law. The Court insisted that patent policy rather than antitrust policy must govern patent misuse cases. One statement of patent policy is found in the Constitution, which authorizes Congress to establish patent laws to promote the progress of the useful arts. Arguably, a conspiracy to suppress a competitive technology is inconsistent with the policy to promote technological progress, as the Lockwasher case suggests.

== See also ==
- Herbert Hovenkamp, Restraints on Innovation, 29 Cardozo L. Rev. 247 (2007)
