= Princo Corp. v. ITC =

- Court: United States Court of Appeals for the Federal Circuit
- Full case name: Princo Corp. v. International Trade Commission
- Decided: August 30, 2010
- Citations: 616 F.3d 1318; 96 U.S.P.Q.2d 1233

Court membership
- Judges sitting: Randall Ray Rader, Pauline Newman, Haldane Robert Mayer, Alan David Lourie, William Curtis Bryson, Arthur J. Gajarsa, Richard Linn, Timothy B. Dyk, Sharon Prost, Kimberly Ann Moore

Case opinions
- Majority: Bryson, joined by Rader, Newman, Lourie, Linn, Moore
- Concurrence: Prost, joined by Mayer
- Dissent: Dyk, joined by Gajarsa

Laws applied
- Tariff Act of 1930, 19 U.S.C. § 1337

Princo Corp. v. ITC, 616 F.3d 1318 (Fed. Cir. 2010) was a 2010 decision of the United States Court of Appeals for the Federal Circuit, that sought to narrow the defense of patent misuse to claims for patent infringement. Princo held that a party asserting the defense of patent misuse, absent a case of so-called per se misuse, must prove both "leveraging" of the patent being enforced against it and a substantial anticompetitive effect outside the legitimate scope of that patent right. In so ruling, the court emphasized that the misuse alleged must involve the patent in suit, not another patent.

The majority opinion substantially "entangle[d] patent misuse jurisprudence with antitrust concepts." The Supreme Court's subsequent opinion in Kimble v. Marvel Entertainment, LLC, however, points strongly in the opposite direction, rejecting the conflation of misuse and antitrust and insisting that they embody different policies.

== Background ==
The US International Trade Commission (ITC) conducted an investigation of Princo's alleged infringement of U.S. Philips Corporation's patents by the importation of optical discs—recordable compact discs ("CD-Rs") and rewritable compact discs ("CD-RWs") (collectively "CD-R/RWs"). Those devices and related technology were developed in the 1980s and 1990s, principally by Philips and Sony, working in collaboration. These companies also developed technical standards to ensure that CD-R and CD-RW discs made by different manufacturers would be compatible and playable on new machines and also preexisting machines that were designed to read the earlier generation of compact discs ("CDs") and "read-only" compact discs ("CD-ROMs"). The standards for CD-Rs and CD-RWs were collected in a publication known as the "Orange Book."

In developing the CD-R/RW standards, Sony and Philips engineers developed different solutions for the problem of how to encode position information in the disc so that a consumer's CD reader/writer could maintain proper positioning while writing data to the disc, which were claimed in their respective patents—Sony's Lagadec patent and Phillips's Raaymakers patents. The engineers from both companies agreed that the Raaymakers approach "was simple and . . . worked very well." The ITC found that by contrast the Lagadec approach was "prone to error" and would have been "very difficult" to implement. Philips and Sony therefore agreed to incorporate the Raaymakers approach in the Orange Book as the standard for manufacturing CD-R/RW discs.

Sony and Phillips pooled the patents needed to implement the standards, and Phillips was designated the administrator to make licenses available to the industry. Philips offered several different "package" licenses to the Philips and Sony patents (and those of several other patent holders). Philips included in the patent packages those patents that it regarded as potentially necessary to make Orange-Book-compliant CD-R or CD-RW discs, including the Raaymakers and Lagadec patents. The package licenses contained a "field of use" restriction, limiting the licensees to using the licensed patents to produce discs according to the Orange Book standards. After 2001, Philips offered additional package options, grouping the patents into two categories, denominated "essential" and "nonessential," for producing CDs.

In the late 1990s, Princo (a Taiwanese manufacturer, also known as Princo Corp or Princo Corporation) sought to manufacture discs and import them into the US, and it entered into a package license agreement with Philips. Soon afterwards, however, Princo stopped paying the licensing fees required by the agreement. Philips then filed a complaint with the ITC, alleging that Princo was violating section 337 of the Tariff Act of 1930, 19 U.S.C. § 1337, by importing CD-Rs and CD-RWs that infringed Philips's patents.

Princo asserted patent misuse as an infringement defense. The ITC rejected the theory that Philips improperly tied the Lagadec patent to the pool license because that patent was not essential to Orange Book-compliant discs. It also rejected the theory that the Lagadec and Raaymakers patents covered potentially competing technologies, and that Philips and Sony foreclosed potential competition between them by agreeing that the Lagadec patent would be available only through package licenses for Orange Book-compliant discs.

== Federal Circuit ruling ==
After several preliminary decisions, the case came before the Federal Circuit en banc. The court concluded (6–2–2) that the conduct alleged was not patent misuse and therefore affirmed the ITC's orders granting relief against Princo. Two judges concurred in the judgment; two judges dissented.

=== Majority opinion ===
Judge Bryson wrote for the majority. In his analysis of the patent misuse doctrine, he began by characterizing "the basic rule of patent misuse: that the patentee may exploit his patent but may not use it to acquire a monopoly not embraced in the patent." He then turned to the Federal Circuit's characterization of misuse "as the patentee's act of impermissibly broaden[ing] the physical or temporal scope of the patent grant with anticompetitive effect." He then summarized Federal Circuit case law on misuse:

The doctrine of patent misuse is thus grounded in the policy-based desire to "prevent a patentee from using the patent to obtain market benefit beyond that which inheres in the statutory patent right." It follows that the key inquiry under the patent misuse doctrine is whether, by imposing the condition in question, the patentee has impermissibly broadened the physical or temporal scope of the patent grant and has done so in a manner that has anticompetitive effects. Where the patentee has not leveraged its patent beyond the scope of rights granted by the Patent Act, misuse has not been found.

He emphasized the importance of recognizing patentees' rights to exploit their patents when determining whether a particular licensing condition has the effect of impermissibly broadening the patent grant and thus constituting misuse: "the patentee begins with substantial rights under the patent grant includ[ing] the right to suppress the invention while continuing to prevent all others from using it, to license others, or to refuse to license, . . . to charge such royalty as the leverage of the patent monopoly permits, and to limit the scope of *1329 the license to a particular field of use." Therefore, he insisted, the doctrine of patent misuse "has largely been confined to a handful of specific practices by which the patentee seemed to be trying to 'extend' his patent grant beyond its statutory limits."

Not all wrongful conduct related to exploitation of patent rights is misuse, he emphasized: "Recognizing the narrow scope of the doctrine, we have emphasized that the defense of patent misuse is not available to a presumptive infringer simply because a patentee engages in some kind of wrongful commercial conduct, even conduct that may have anticompetitive effects." Thus:

While proof of an antitrust violation shows that the patentee has committed wrongful conduct having anticompetitive effects, that does not establish misuse of the patent in suit unless the conduct in question restricts the use of that patent and does so in one of the specific ways that have been held to be outside the otherwise broad scope of the patent grant.

Judge Bryson then turned to the 1988 amendment of 35 U.S.C. § 271(d), which states that it is not misuse (i) to refuse to license a patent or (ii) to tie a license under one patent to acceptance of a license under another patent unless the patent owner has market power in the relevant market for the first such patent. Judge Bryson said that the majority in this case did not accept the dissenting judges' argument that § 271(d) failed to immunize concerted refusals to grant a license. He concluded that this section of the patent law made it clear that Congress "sought to confine it [the misuse doctrine] to anticompetitive conduct by patentees who leverage their patents to obtain economic advantages outside the legitimate scope of the patent grant."

Turning then to the facts of this case and how the foregoing doctrinal analysis applied to them, Judge Bryson said that Philips's challenged conduct "presents a completely different scenario from the cases previously identified by the Supreme Court and by this court as implicating the doctrine of patent misuse." In this case:

Philips is not imposing restrictive conditions on the use of the Raaymakers patents to enlarge the physical or temporal scope of those patents. Instead, the alleged act of patent misuse . . . was the claimed horizontal agreement between Philips and Sony to restrict the availability of the Lagadec patent—an entirely different patent that was never asserted in the infringement action against Princo. Even if such an agreement were shown to exist, and even if it were shown to have anticompetitive effects, a horizontal agreement restricting the availability of Sony's Lagadec patent would not constitute misuse of Philips's Raaymakers patents or any of Philips's other patents in suit.

Accordingly, Judge Bryson explained, "the question in this case comes down to this: When a patentee offers to license a patent, does the patentee misuse that patent by inducing a third party not to license its separate, competitive technology?" No precedent so holds, he insisted, and it did not fit within the requirement for misuse that the Philips-Sony agreement "have the effect of increasing the physical or temporal scope of the patent in suit." In this case the infringement is of the Raaymakers patents while the concerted refusal to license involves the Lagadec patent. To find patent misuse, there must be "patent leverage." That patent whose infringement is the basis of the lawsuit must itself significantly contribute to the practice under attack. That is not so here, and patent misuse will not be found when there is no connection" between the patent right and the misconduct in question.

The court rejected Princo's arguments that misuse requirements were met. First, Princo said that Philips "leveraged" its patents, because it used the proceeds of its highly successful licensing program to fund royalty payments to Sony and because those payments gave Sony the incentive to enter into the alleged agreement to suppress the Lagadec patent. The court replied that "the use of funds from a lawful licensing program to support other, anticompetitive behavior is not the kind of 'leveraging' that the Supreme Court and this court have referred to in discussing the leveraging of a patent that constitutes patent misuse."

Second, Princo asserted that the Supreme Court has not required conventional "leveraging" of a patent in order to establish patent misuse. But the cases on which Princo relied, the court said, were antitrust cases and "those cases did not involve patent misuse or the enforceability of the defendants' patents." In addition, even if there is an antitrust violation with respect to Sony's Lagadec patent it does not follow that Philips is guilty of patent misuse with respect to the Raaymakers patents.

The dissent says that there is a horizontal agreement between Philips and Sony to suppress the Lagadec technology. "The dissent then characterizes that agreement as invoking the doctrine of patent misuse because it is 'part and parcel' of the licensing agreements between Philips and its licensees." That is incorrect, Judge Bryson argued: Princo's real grievance is just that "the Lagadec patent has not been made available for non-Orange-Book uses. And that is not patent misuse under any court's definition of the term." It may be an antitrust violation but it is not patent misuse.

To sum up what is wrong with Princo's misuse claims, the court said:

This is not a case in which conditions have been placed in patent licenses to require licensees to agree to anticompetitive terms going beyond the scope of the patent grant. Rather, in this case the assertion of misuse arises not from the terms of the license itself but rather from an alleged collateral agreement between Sony and Philips. In that setting, the doctrine of patent misuse does not immunize Princo against the legal effect of its acts of infringement.

In addition to the lack of a proper leveraging claim, Princo misuse arguments fail because "Princo failed to establish that the alleged agreement to suppress the Lagadec technology had anticompetitive effects." As the ITC found, "the Lagadec technology was not a viable potential competitor to the technology embodied in the Raaymakers patents." Therefore, its suppression by the Philips-Sony agreement had no effect (in any but-for sense). The court insisted that the proper rule for finding misuse is that "to sustain a misuse defense involving a licensing arrangement not held to have been per se anticompetitive by the Supreme Court, a factual determination must reveal that the overall effect of the license tends to restrain competition unlawfully in an appropriately defined relevant market."

In addition to arguing misuse, Princo argued that the "agreement between Philips and Sony not to license the Lagadec technology for non-Orange-Book purposes was a naked restraint of trade with no procompetitive justification, and that Philips's conduct in entering into that agreement should render its Orange Book patents unenforceable." The court disagreed. This all grew out of a joint venture between Philips and Sony to develop standards for and commercialize CD-R/RW technology, with "significant procompetitive features," so that it must be analyzed under the rule of reason rather than as a "naked restraint."

That Philips and Sony agreed not to compete with one another in respect of their joint venture was a reasonable restraint ancillary to the venture. In any case, the court continued, there was no anticompetitive effect, because "even if there was such an agreement, it did not have the effect of suppressing potentially viable technology that could have competed with the Orange Book standards." That was true because ""there has been no showing that the Lagadec '565 patent competes with another patent in the pool, no showing that the pool licensors would have competed in the technology licensing market absent the pooling arrangement." Princo did not show "that the Lagadec approach is a commercially viable technological alternative to the technology of [the Raaymakers patents]." The Lagadec approach was lacking in both technical feasibility and commercial potential. "Princo had the burden of showing that the hypothesized agreement had an actual adverse effect on competition in the relevant market." That meant that "Princo had to demonstrate was that there was a reasonable probability that the Lagadec technology, if available for licensing, would have matured into a competitive force in the storage technology market." It did not meet that burden.

The majority therefore concluded "that even if Philips and Sony engaged in an agreement not to license the Lagadec patent for non-Orange-Book purposes, that hypothesized agreement had no bearing on the physical or temporal scope of the patents in suit, nor did it have anticompetitive effects in the relevant market." There was no misuse and the patents were enforceable.

=== Concurring opinion ===
Judge Prost concurred in part with the majority, in an opinion joined by Judge Mayer. They agreed that "Princo failed to meet its burden of showing that any agreement regarding the Lagadec patent had anticompetitive effects." Therefore, "Princo's failure to make this threshold showing resolves this case." They disagreed, however, with both majority and dissent omn the scope of the misuse doctrine, "doubt[ing] that the doctrine is as narrow or expansive as each respectively suggests." Pointing to Zenith Radio Corp. v. Hazeltine Research, Inc., Judge Prost said that whether the patentee had violated antitrust law could indicate that patent misuse occurred. That the combined effect of an agreement to license the Raaymakers patents, but not license the Lagadec patent, could have enabled Philips to obtain the type of "market benefit beyond that which inheres in the statutory patent right" of either patent, and thus support finding misuse under the majority's test. In any case, it was unnecessary to determine the full scope of the misuse doctrine, given the evidentiary shortcomings of Princo's case. Therefore, " I would thus reserve judgment on the precise metes and bounds of the patent misuse doctrine."

=== Dissenting Opinion ===
Judge Dyk, joined by Judge Gajarsa, dissented. They began by challenging the majority's view that existence of an antitrust violation did not require finding misuse:

The critical question is whether the existence of an antitrust violation in the form of an agreement to suppress an alternative technology designed to protect a patented technology from competition constitutes misuse of the protected patents. The majority holds that it does not. This seems directly contrary to the Supreme Court's view of patent misuse in its recent Illinois Tool Works decision, where the Court concluded that "[i]t would be absurd to assume that Congress intended to provide that the use of a patent that merited punishment as a felony [under the Sherman Act] would not constitute 'misuse.' "

Princo, accused of infringing Philips's Raaymakers patents, asserted that Philips misused the asserted Raaymakers patents by (1) agreeing with Sony that the alternative technology embodied in the Lagadec patent will not be licensed in competition with the Raaymakers technology, and (2) securing an agreement from the licensees of the Raaymakers and Lagadec patents barring them from using the Lagadec patent to develop an alternative technology that would compete with the Raaymakers technology. The majority holds that there is no patent misuse (1) because the Lagadec patent has not itself been asserted in this proceeding, and (2) alternatively, because "Princo also failed to show that the asserted agreement had any anticompetitive effects because . . . the Lagadec technology was not a viable potential competitor to the technology embodied in the Raaymakers patents."

As to the first point, "Contrary to the majority, the Supreme Court cases establish that license agreements that suppress alternative technologies can constitute misuse of the patents for the protected technology, and the regional circuits have agreed." The majority's second point—"that there is no misuse unless the accused infringer shows that the technology was, or would probably have become, commercially viable is contrary to established patent misuse doctrine [which] . , , recognizes that antitrust violations may constitute misuse; that a presumption of anticompetitive effect flows from an agreement not to compete; and that the burden rests on the patent holder to justify such an agreement."

Addressing the majority's position that wrongful conduct in regard to the Lagadec patent is irrelevant to determining misuse because the patents in suit are the Raaymakers patents, the dissent disagrees that the proper concept of misuse is extension of the scope of the patent in suit. Rather, the dissent argues, citing Ethyl Gasoline Corp. v. United States, the proper rule is "that patent misuse occurs when patent licensing agreements are used 'to control conduct by the licensee not embraced in the patent monopoly.' " That multiple agreements are involved is immaterial, because they are all part of the same course of conduct. The dissent concluded: "In holding that Philips' anticompetitive behavior cannot constitute patent misuse because the Lagadec patent was not asserted, the majority has significantly narrowed the patent misuse doctrine and has disregarded governing Supreme Court authority and congressional intent."

The dissent next challenged the majority's ruling that Princo had to show anticompetitive effect "even if Philips and Sony engaged in an agreement not to license the Lagadec patent." The Supreme Court has held that "patent pooling agreements involving agreements not to compete violate the antitrust laws." The dissent argues, first, "The agreement to suppress the Lagadec patent, a competing technology, surely falls within" the principle that such agreements are "inherently suspect," so that showing their existence creates a prima facie case and shifts the burden to Philips to "come...forward with some plausible (and legally cognizable) competitive justification for the restraint" or show that the restriction was not anticompetitive. Second, even where the rule of reason applies, the burden is on the proponent of a restriction to show justification, despite the fact that a research joint venture is involved. The restriction must not only be ancillary to the joint venture agreement but reasonably necessary to its being carried out successfully. "Even if a joint venture were necessary to produce the CD-R/RW standard, it does not follow that concerted activity in marketing, and suppressing, intellectual property was necessary to produce the standard." Here, the dissent maintained, at oral argument "counsel for Philips conceded that he could think of no competitive justification for the restraint, and Philips has pointed to no record evidence that the suppression agreement was necessary to serve the joint venture's legitimate goals."

== Subsequent developments ==
In Kimble v. Marvel Entertainment, LLC, the Supreme Court considered the relationship of patent policy to antitrust policy. In Kimble, the question was whether to reaffirm or overrule a patent misuse precedent holding agreements for post-patent-expiration royalties unenforceable. The precedent, Brulotte v. Thys Co., had been heavily criticized because it was inconsistent with modern antitrust policy, which generally requires a showing of substantial anticompetitive effects before courts condemn a practice. The Court rejected the application of antitrust policy and any requirement that anticompetitive effects be shown.

"If Brulotte were an antitrust rather than a patent case," the Court said, it might agree with the arguments for overruling Brulotte. "But Brulotte is a patent rather than an antitrust case," and therefore antitrust considerations were beside the point. The Brulotte ruling did not depend "on the notion that post-patent royalties harm competition." That was not surprising, the Court said: "The patent laws—unlike the Sherman Act—do not aim to maximize competition (to a large extent, the opposite)." Therefore, "in deciding whether post-expiration royalties comport with patent law, Brulotte did not undertake to assess that practice's likely competitive effects."

Instead, the Court looked to patent policy. Since the practice at issue "runs counter to the policy and purpose of the patent laws," the Court explained, "patent (not antitrust) policy gave rise to the Court's conclusion that post-patent royalty contracts are unenforceable—utterly regardless of a demonstrable effect on competition." Based on patent policy, rather than antitrust policy, the Court confirmed the illegality of post-patent royalties.

The rationale of Kimble is contrary to that of the Federal Circuit in Princo, which requires a showing of anticompetive effects and determines whether conduct is misuse on the basis of antitrust policies. Arguably, since the policy of the patent-copyright clause of the Constitution is to promote the progress of science and useful arts, a conspiracy such as that alleged in Princo to suppress an alternative, competitive technology is contrary to patent policy.

== Commentary ==
• Saami Zain strongly criticized the Princo decision. arguing against its heightened evidentiary requirement of proof of anticompetitive effect and concluding that its requirement of "such an exacting test for misuse seems perverse." Zain says that the court's requirement of "but for" proof of effect is anomalous:

But for" analysis is commonly applied to calculate damages in antitrust cases. However, not even an antitrust plaintiff seeking treble damages and an injunction is required to prove as an element of liability that "but for" the unlawful conduct, plaintiff would not have suffered any harm. Rather, an antitrust plaintiff need only demonstrate that the anticompetitive conduct was a "material cause" of its asserted injury. To require such a substantial evidentiary showing to successfully prove an equitable defense seems excessive and contrary to the public policy arguments set forth in Supreme Court misuse cases.

Zain argues that this "bizarre and onerous" requirement imposes such a heavy burden on those asserting misuse that it can "grant patentees misuse immunity for potentially anticompetitive conduct in cases where evidence of the anticompetitive effects may be extremely difficult to obtain—possibly due to the success of the very conduct being challenged." Furthermore, he observes, "Princo creates the rather odd possibility that it may be more difficult to successfully assert misuse—an equitable defense—than an affirmative treble damages antitrust claim."

• Camille Barr maintains that "the Federal Circuit erred in Princo by drastically narrowing the patent misuse doctrine." Foreshadowing the holding in Kimble, she argues that "the doctrine of patent misuse clearly arose out of patent law, not antitrust law." She also argues that Princo errs in suggesting that § 271(d)'s statement that it is not misuse for a patentee to refuse to grant a license makes competitors' concerted refusals to license a patent immune from antitrust or misuse challenge.

• Professor Hovenkamp states that the patent statute "expressly permits unilateral refusals to license, but does not say anything about concerted refusals to license-although the Federal Circuit suggested to the contrary in its Princo Corp." opinion. Hovenkamp criticizes the ruling that a concerted refusal to license could not be misuse: "Not only does it deny rivals that particular technology but it also prevents them from developing any technology independently that would infringe one or more of that patent's claims. Someone wishing to develop a digital alternative to the analog technology licensed in the Sony/Philips package would have to invent around the Lagadec patent claims even though the technology claimed in that patent is not in use." He points out that the Princo position contradicts ordinary antitrust law on this point, which makes "unilateral refusals to license virtually lawful per se while often condemning concerted refusals to license IP rights."

• Brian Hill asserts, "The overall effect of the Princo decision will likely be that courts will become increasingly unable to discourage anticompetitive joint venture activity." He emphasizes the problematic impact on established firms' suppression of nascent technology:

The court's decision suggests that in order to establish patent misuse based on an agreement to suppress technology, a defendant must show but-for competitive harm. . . . Requiring defendants to establish actual commercial potential may frequently be impossible when the technology being suppressed is so new or experimental that its market value cannot be demonstrated.

Accordingly, he maintains, the Princo opinion sends the message "that suppressing nascent and unproven technology without a clear market potential does not have the requisite anticompetitive effect necessary to establish patent misuse."

• Professor Stern refers to Princo as having "established the high-water mark for the Federal Circuit's attempted retrenchment of the patent misuse doctrine and its revanchist project to cabin the Supreme Court's prior expansive misuse jurisprudence." But the Supreme Court's 2015 decision in Kimble v. Marvel may undermine the Federal Circuit's misuse jurisprudence.

Stern points to Kimble's holding that patent misuse cases do not rest on antitrust policy; they take their cues from patent policy. From that he argues, "The effect of the Kimble decision would seem to be to roll back the line of Federal Circuit decisions culminating in Princo, which had made a showing of substantial anti-competitive effect in the relevant market an essential element of proof in most misuse cases."

However, whether the Federal Circuit will pay attention to Kimble and how limited a reading it will give it, he says, remain uncertain. In this connection he points to a comment by Chief Justice John Roberts in a 2009 oral argument—that "other than the Federal Circuit", the circuit courts of appeal "can't say, 'I don't like the Supreme Court rule so I'm not going to apply it'."
