= Alfred Edward Eckes Jr. =

Alfred Edward Eckes Jr. (born July 11, 1942) is an American historian, academic, author, editor, and former government official. He served as chairman of the United States International Trade Commission (USITC) from 1982 to 1984 and was a member of the commission from 1981 to 1990. He later became a professor at Ohio University, where he researched the history of United States international trade.

== Early life and education ==
Eckes received a Bachelor of Arts degree from Washington and Lee University, a master's degree from the Fletcher School of Law and Diplomacy at Tufts University, and a PhD from the University of Texas at Austin. In 1964–1965, he attended Christ's College, Cambridge, on a Fulbright Program/Fulbright Fellowship, where he studied international economics.

== Career ==
=== Early academic and editorial career ===
Eckes taught at Ohio State University and Ohio University, and later at Rollins College. He also worked in journalism and government-related positions. From 1977 to 1979, he was editorial page editor of ''The Columbus Dispatch''. From 1979 to 1981, he served as executive director of the House Republican Conference of the United States House of Representatives.

=== U.S. International Trade Commission ===
In 1981, President Ronald Reagan appointed Eckes to a nine-year term on the United States International Trade Commission, the successor to the U.S. Tariff Commission. Reagan designated him chairman in 1982.

During his tenure, Eckes participated in more than 1,000 import-remedy investigations and investigated aspects of U.S. international trade and tariffs involving Asia, Australasia, Europe, and the Americas. The commission considered cases involving products including steel, footwear, motorcycles, copper, Rubik's cubes, and Pac-Man games.

During the 1980s, Eckes spoke publicly about the effects of increasing imports and trade deficits on U.S. industries. He testified before Congress more than 20 times, addressed trade associations, and spoke twice at the National Press Club.

=== Academic career and research ===
After completing his term at the USITC in 1990, Eckes joined Ohio University as the Ohio Eminent Research Professor of Contemporary History. His research concentrated on the history of U.S. international trade.

His 1995 book, ''Opening America's Market: U.S. Foreign Trade Policy Since 1776'', examined the development of U.S. foreign trade policy and argued that post-World War II trade policy involved opening the American domestic market to imports while tolerating foreign discrimination against American goods.

Eckes also wrote on the Smoot–Hawley Tariff Act of 1930. He challenged interpretations that attributed a significant role to the act in worsening the Great Depression and provoking foreign retaliation.

Eckes was elected president of the International Trade and Finance Association in 2000. He later served for ten years as the association's executive vice-president (2004–2010, 2014–2016).

== Books ==
Selected books and edited works by Eckes include:

- ''A Search for Solvency: Bretton Woods and the International Monetary System, 1941–1971'' (University of Texas Press, 1975)
- ''The United States and the Global Struggle for Minerals'' (University of Texas Press, 1979)
- ''A History of Presidential Elections'', 4th ed., with Eugene Roseboom (Macmillan, 1979)
- ''Opening America's Market: U.S. Foreign Trade Policy Since 1776'' (University of North Carolina Press, 1995)
- ''U.S. Trade Policy: History, Theory, and the WTO'', with William A. Lovett and Richard L. Brinkman (M. E. Sharpe, 1999)
- ''Revisiting U.S. Trade Policy: Decisions in Perspective'', editor (Ohio University Press, 2000)
- ''Globalization and the American Century'', with Thomas W. Zeiler (Cambridge University Press, 2003)
- ''U.S. Trade Issues'' (ABC-CLIO, 2009)
- ''The Contemporary Global Economy: A History Since 1980'' (Wiley-Blackwell, 2011)
- ''Trade Wars on E Street: The ITC in the 1980s'' (Digital Publishing of Florida, 2019)
