= Oakton, Virginia =

Census-designated place in Virginia

- Census-designated place
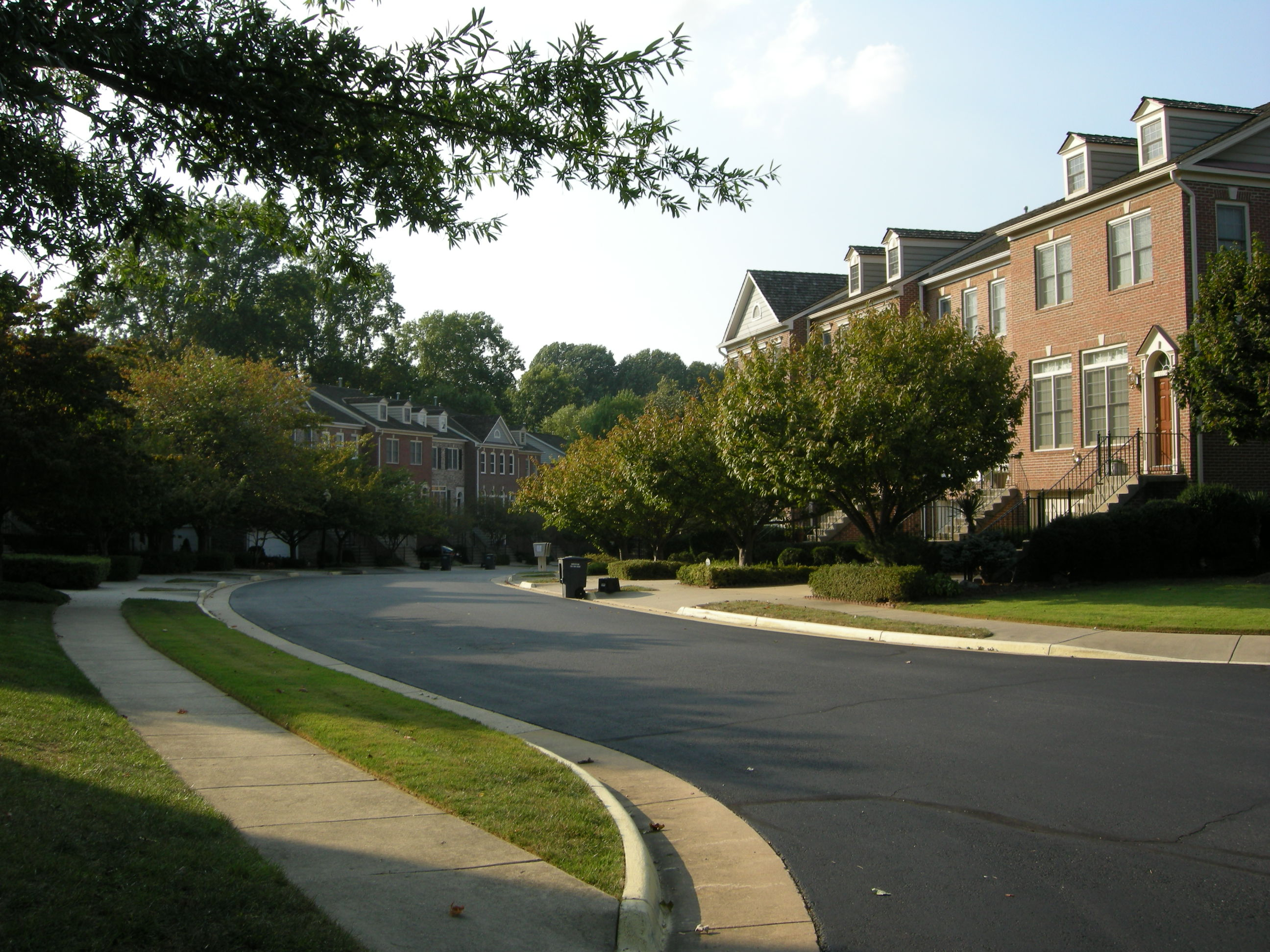
- Street in urban Oakton

- Location of Oakton in Fairfax County, Virginia

- Location within Northern Virginia Location within Virginia Location within the United States
- Coordinates: 38°52′59″N 77°17′24″W
- Country: United States
- State: Virginia
- County: Fairfax

Area
  - Total: 9.8 sq mi (25.4 km^{2})
  - Land: 9.8 sq mi (25.3 km^{2})
  - Water: 0.039 sq mi (0.1 km^{2})
- Elevation: 413 ft (126 m)

Population (2020)
  - Total: 36,732
  - Density: 3,745/sq mi (1,446.1/km^{2})
- Time zone: UTC−5 (Eastern (EST))
  - Summer (DST): UTC−4 (EDT)
- ZIP code: 22124
- Area codes: 703, 571
- FIPS code: 51-58472
- GNIS feature ID: 1471790

Oakton is a census-designated place (CDP) in Fairfax County, Virginia, United States. The population was 36,732 at the 2020 census. Located in Northern Virginia, its center is 16 miles (26 km) west of Washington, D.C.

== Geography ==
Oakton is located in central Fairfax County at 38°52′59″N 77°17′24″W (38.883050, −77.289900). The area is traversed by Interstate 66 and Virginia State Route 123.

The CDP is bordered to the south by the city of Fairfax, to the west by Fair Oaks, to the northwest by Difficult Run, to the north by the Wolf Trap CDP, to the east by the town of Vienna, and to the southeast by Merrifield.

According to the U.S. Census Bureau, Oakton has a total area of 9.8 square miles (25.3 km^{2}).

== Demographics ==
=== Racial and ethnic composition ===
Oakton CDP, Virginia – Racial and ethnic composition Note: the US Census treats Hispanic/Latino as an ethnic category. This table excludes Latinos from the racial categories and assigns them to a separate category. Hispanics/Latinos may be of any race.
Race / Ethnicity (NH = Non-Hispanic)	Pop 2000	Pop 2010	Pop 2020	% 2000	% 2010	% 2020
White alone (NH)	20,101	20,411	18,765	68.49%	59.74%	51.09%
Black or African American alone (NH)	1,365	1,640	2,055	4.65%	4.80%	5.59%
Native American or Alaska Native alone (NH)	50	72	20	0.17%	0.21%	0.05%
Asian alone (NH)	4,051	6,769	9,061	13.80%	19.81%	24.67%
Native Hawaiian or Pacific Islander alone (NH)	22	10	21	0.07%	0.03%	0.06%
Other race alone (NH)	69	134	232	0.24%	0.39%	0.63%
Mixed race or Multiracial (NH)	859	1,108	2,064	2.93%	3.24%	5.62%
Hispanic or Latino (any race)	2,831	4,022	4,514	9.65%	11.77%	12.29%
Total	29,348	34,166	36,732	100.00%	100.00%	100.00%

=== 2020 census ===
As of the 2020 census, Oakton had a population of 36,732. 100.0% of residents lived in urban areas, while 0.0% lived in rural areas.

The median age was 38.0 years. 23.6% of residents were under the age of 18 and 13.7% were 65 years of age or older. For every 100 females there were 96.6 males, and for every 100 females age 18 and over there were 93.5 males age 18 and over.

There were 13,610 households in Oakton, of which 35.7% had children under the age of 18 living in them. Of all households, 56.8% were married-couple households, 15.1% were households with a male householder and no spouse or partner present, and 23.5% were households with a female householder and no spouse or partner present. About 22.2% of all households were made up of individuals and 7.8% had someone living alone who was 65 years of age or older.

There were 14,183 housing units, of which 4.0% were vacant. The homeowner vacancy rate was 0.8% and the rental vacancy rate was 5.6%.

The population density was 3,748.2 inhabitants per square mile (1,446.1/km^{2}), and the housing unit density was 1,447.2 per square mile (558.4/km^{2}).

Racial composition as of the 2020 census
Race	Number	Percent
White	19,460	53.0%
Black or African American	2,102	5.7%
American Indian and Alaska Native	102	0.3%
Asian	9,106	24.8%
Native Hawaiian and Other Pacific Islander	22	0.1%
Some other race	1,774	4.8%
Two or more races	4,166	11.3%
Hispanic or Latino (of any race)	4,514	12.3%

=== 2010 census ===
The population at the 2010 census was 34,166 people.

=== 2000 census ===
As of the 2000 census, there were 29,348 people, 11,118 households, and 7,649 families residing in the CDP. The population density was 3,024.1 inhabitants per square mile (1,167.6/km^{2}). There were 11,392 housing units at an average density of 1,173.9 per square mile (453.2/km^{2}). The racial makeup of the CDP was 74.46% White, 5.79% African American, 0.20% Native American, 13.83% Asian, 0.08% Pacific Islander, 3.08% from other races, and 3.56% from two or more races. Hispanic or Latino of any race were 9.65% of the population.

There were 11,118 households, out of which 32.7% had children under the age of 18 living with them, 57.8% were married couples living together, 7.9% had a female householder with no husband present, and 31.2% were non-families. 21.7% of all households were made up of individuals, and 3.8% had someone living alone who was 65 years of age or older. The average household size was 2.63 and the average family size was 3.08.

In the CDP, the population was spread out, with 23.3% under the age of 18, 7.7% from 18 to 24, 34.9% from 25 to 44, 26.6% from 45 to 64, and 7.5% who were 65 years of age or older. The median age was 36 years. For every 100 females, there were 97.5 males. For every 100 females age 18 and over, there were 95.0 males.

According to the 2010 census estimate, the median income for a household in the CDP was $167,512, and the median income for a family was $188,308. Males had a median income of $111,856 versus $73,254 for females. The per capita income for the CDP was $65,934. About 3.9% of families and 4.7% of the population were below the poverty line, including 4.7% of those under age 18 and 6.7% of those age 65 or over.

Historical population
Census	Pop.	Note	%±
1990	24,610		—
2000	29,348		19.3%
2010	34,166		16.4%
2020	36,732		7.5%
* U.S. Decennial Census

== Notable people ==
- Jim Callis, baseball writer, MLB.com
- Bryan Caplan, economics professor, George Mason University
- Serena Deeb, professional wrestler, AEW
- John Doolittle, former member, U.S. House of Representatives
- Robert F. Dorr, author and former U.S. diplomat
- Mortimer L. Downey, former U.S. Deputy Secretary of Transportation
- Jacob Frey, mayor, Minneapolis, Minnesota
- Ira Noel Gabrielson, former naturalist
- Bud Grace, cartoonist
- Francis Greenlief, former major general and Chief of the National Guard Bureau, U.S. Army
- David E. Jeremiah, former admiral, U.S. Navy
- Thomas David Jones, author and former astronaut
- John D. Lavelle, former general and Seventh Air Force commander, U.S. Air Force
- Kigeli V Ndahindurwa, former King of Rwanda
- Fred Moosally, former captain, USS Iowa battleship during the 1989 USS Iowa turret explosion
- Daniel R. Pearson, former chairman, U.S. International Trade Commission
- Nancy Pfotenhauer, former spokesperson, 2008 John McCain presidential campaign
- Jennifer Rubin, former columnist, The Washington Post
- Romuald Spasowski, former Polish ambassador to the United States during the Cold War, who defected to the U.S. in 1981
- John Stertzer, former professional soccer player
- John H. Sununu, former White House aide and governor of New Hampshire
- Jared Taylor, founder, American Renaissance magazine, and white nationalist
- Philip Terzian, journalist and author, former literary editor of The Weekly Standard
- Alan S. Thompson, former vice admiral, U.S. Navy
- Zain, professional Super Smash Bros. Melee player

== Education ==
=== Primary and secondary schools ===
Fairfax County Public Schools operates the public schools. There are two public schools located in Oakton: Oakton Elementary School and Waples Mill Elementary School. Flint Hill School, a private school, is located in Oakton. The Northern Virginia Friends School and the Montessori School of Oakton are also in the CDP. Students may also attend Flint Hill Elementary School, Luther Jackson Middle School or Henry David Thoreau Middle School in Vienna. Local high schools are Oakton High School and James Madison High School. Both schools have Vienna mailing addresses.

=== Public libraries ===
Fairfax County Public Library operates the Oakton Library in Oakton.
