= Dean A. Pinkert =

American trade lawyer

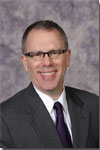

Member of the United States International Trade Commission
- In office February 26, 2007 - March 1, 2017
- President: George W. Bush; Barack Obama; Donald Trump
- Preceded by: Jennifer A. Hillman
- Succeeded by: Jason Kearns

Personal details
- Born: June 5, 1956 (age 68); Chicago, Illinois
- Political party: Democratic
- Spouse: Susan Paley
- Children: 2
- Education: University of Texas School of Law; London School of Economics and Political Science

Dean Arthur Pinkert (born June 5, 1956, in Chicago, Illinois) is an American trade lawyer.

== Education ==
Pinkert was graduated from New Trier High School - East in 1974. He holds a Bachelor of Arts degree with high honors from Oberlin College (1978), a Juris Doctor degree with honors from the University of Texas School of Law (1983), and a Master of Laws degree with merit from the London School of Economics and Political Science (1989). He did graduate work at Princeton University (1978–1979).

== International Trade Commissioner ==
Dean Arthur Pinkert was sworn in as a member of the International Trade Commission on February 26, 2007, for a term expiring in December 2015. He succeeded Jennifer Anne Hillman.

President George W. Bush nominated him on September 7, 2006, and again on January 9, 2007. The United States Senate confirmed him on February 1, 2007. Pinkert became vice chairman of the commission on June 17, 2014. His service ended February 28, 2017, leaving his seat vacant starting March 1, 2017.

== Career ==
- In July 2020 Mr. Pinkert became senior counsel at McDermott Will & Emery in Washington, D.C.
- Pinkert joined Hughes Hubbard as a partner in March 2017.
- Pinkert represented the United States in resolving the dispute over Canadian softwood lumber. He has also worked on international trade proceedings involving steel, apple juice, corn syrup, mushrooms, wheat, and Mexican cement.
- Pinkert was a senior attorney (2001–2006) in the Office of the Chief Counsel for Import Administration in the International Trade Administration of the Department of Commerce. In that position, his work included serving as liaison with U.S. Customs and Border Protection, counsel to the Foreign Trade Zone program, advisor to the U.S. Trade Representative in various trade negotiations, and litigation counsel in antidumping and countervailing duty matters before domestic and international tribunals.
- During 2001, Pinkert served as the Trade and Judiciary Counsel to Senator Robert Byrd (D-WV), who strongly endorsed Pinkert for the USITC, as did Senator Rockefeller (D-WV).
- From 1998 through 2000, Pinkert was a senior associate in the Litigation and Trade group in the Washington, D.C. office of King & Spalding, where he represented U.S. companies in antidumping and countervailing duty investigations. He also handled, and supervised, export control matters for the group.
- Pinkert was an Attorney-Advisor (1990–1998) in the Office of the Chief Counsel for Import Administration.
- Pinkert was an associate (1984–1988) and partner (1988) in the law firm Fickman and Van Os in Austin, Texas.
- Pinkert began his career (1983–1984) as an associate at Robins, Zelle, Larson, and Kaplan (now known as Robins, Kaplan, Miller & Ciresi) in Minneapolis, a law firm noted for representing victims of catastrophe.

== Personal life ==
Dean Pinkert was born to Norman and Jeanne Pinkert in Chicago and raised in Wilmette, Illinois. His family was in the scrap business. He resides in Alexandria, Virginia, with his wife Susan Paley and their children, Rose and Zeke.

== Works ==
- "The Concept of Specificity in the Bilateral Steel Agreements", The University of Ottawa Law Journal (1991)
- "Issues in Sampling", The Commerce Department Speaks, PLI (1992)
- "Target Dumping Methodology: Scattershot or Bull's-Eye", The Commerce Department Speaks, PLI (1998)
- Pinkert, Dean A.; Thomas D. Blanford (2001). "Judicial Review of Export Control Determinations". Brooklyn Journal of International Law. 26 (3). Brooklyn Law School: New York City. Archived from the original on July 17, 2011.

Preceded by Jennifer A. Hillman	member, United States International Trade Commission; 2007-2015	Succeeded by N/A
