= Daniel R. Pearson =

American government official

Daniel R. Pearson is a commissioner and former chairman of the United States International Trade Commission.

Pearson, a Republican from Minnesota, was nominated to the U.S. International Trade Commission by President George W. Bush and confirmed by the U.S. Senate on November 21, 2004 for the term ending June 16, 2011. He began serving as a commissioner on October 8, 2003, under a recess appointment. Bush designated him chairman from June 17, 2006 through June 16, 2008.

Prior to his appointment, Pearson was assistant vice president of public affairs for Cargill, in Wayzata, Minnesota. His work focused primarily on trade policy issues, including the World Trade Organization (WTO) agricultural negotiations, the efforts of China and other countries to join the WTO, the global “level playing field” initiative for the oilseed sector, the U.S.-Mexico sweetener dispute, and the effects of domestic agricultural policies on U.S. competitiveness. Before his appointment to assistant vice president, he served as a policy analyst in the public affairs department from 1987 to 1998.

From 1981 to 1987, Pearson was the agricultural legislative assistant to former Sen. Rudy Boschwitz in Washington, D.C., where he was responsible for legislative and regulatory issues under the jurisdiction of the Senate Agricultural Committee. He also served as staff of the Subcommittee on Foreign Agricultural Policy, chaired by Boschwitz.

From 1979 to 1980, Pearson farmed in a diversified 800-acre (3.2 km^{2}) operation with his father and brother in Ogilvie, Minnesota. He holds a bachelor of science degree and a master of science degree, both in agricultural economics, from the University of Minnesota. He resides in Oakton, Virginia with his wife, Cindy, and two children.
