= Jason Kearns =

American lawyer

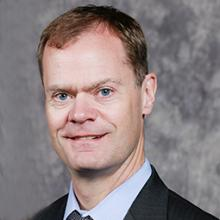

Member of the United States International Trade Commission
- Incumbent
- Assumed office April 2, 2018
- President: Donald Trump; Joe Biden; Donald Trump
- Preceded by: Dean A. Pinkert

Personal details
- Party: Democratic
- Spouse: Lindy Arn
- Children: 3
- Education: University of Denver; Harvard University; University of Pennsylvania Law School

Jason Kearns is an American lawyer and government official, currently serving as a commissioner for the United States International Trade Commission.

Before his appointment to the commission, Kearns served as chief international trade counsel to the United States House Committee on Ways and Means. Kearns previously served in the Office of the General Counsel to the U.S. Trade Representative and worked in the international trade group of the law firm WilmerHale.

Kearns was originally nominated to serve on the United States International Trade Commission by outgoing President Barack Obama in January 2017. After President Obama left office, Kearns' nomination was withdrawn and then resubmitted by President Trump. He was confirmed by the U.S. Senate in March 2018. He served as Chair of the Commission for a two-year term, from June 2020 to June 2022.

Kearns was accused of intimidation after internal divisions over the future of international trade policy devolved into a heated battle at the Commission. The accusation was made public just as President Joe Biden prepared to name a new chair of the ITC. Kearns was one of the contenders for the top job. After an investigation, the Commission's inspector general determined Kearns did not bully or harass any employee of the Commission.
