= Paula Stern =

American businesswoman (born 1945)

Chair of the United States International Trade Commission
- In office 1984–1986
- President: Ronald Reagan

Member of the United States International Trade Commission
- In office October 1978 – February 1987
- President: Jimmy Carter

Personal details
- Born: March 31, 1945 (age 81) Chicago, Illinois
- Party: Democratic
- Spouse: Paul London (m. 1972)
- Children: 2
- Education: Goucher College (B.A.); Harvard University (M.A.); Tufts University (M.A., Ph.D.)

Paula Stern (born March 31, 1945) is an American businesswoman and former chairwoman of the United States International Trade Commission. She was first named as a commissioner by President Jimmy Carter in 1978 and appointed as chair in 1984 by President Ronald Reagan, a position she served in until 1986. During her tenure, she was highly critical of U.S. trade policies under the Reagan administration.

== Early life, education, and career ==
Stern attended public schools in Memphis, Tennessee, and received her bachelor's degree from Goucher College in 1967. She went on to earn a master's degree from Harvard University in 1969 as well as two additional masters' and a doctorate from the Fletcher School of Law and Diplomacy at Tufts University. Her 1976 dissertation at Tufts was titled The Water's Edge: The Jackson Amendment as a Case Study of the Role Domestic Politics Plays in the Creation of American Foreign Policy. This thesis served as the basis for her first book, Water's Edge: Domestic Politics and the Making of American Foreign Policy, which focused on Congress's role in formulating U.S. foreign policy.

Stern entered government in the late 1970s as a Senate legislative aide to Gaylord Nelson. She was also a fellow for the Council on Foreign Relations from 1976 to 1977. In 1993, she served on President Bill Clinton's advisory committee on trade policy. From 1994 to 2000, she was a professor of international business at Hamline University. Stern later founded a consulting firm in Washington, D.C., the Stern Group.

== Board memberships ==
Stern has served on a number of corporate boards, including for CBS, Walmart, Duracell, Harcourt, Avaya, Neiman Marcus, Avon, and Hasbro. She is also a member of the Atlantic Council's board of directors. Stern is a member of the Inter-American Dialogue.

== Books ==
- Water's Edge: Domestic Politics and the Making of American Foreign Policy (Praeger, 1979)
