= Shara L. Aranoff =

Chairman of the U.S. International Trade Commission

- Education: Princeton University; Harvard Law School; Graduate Institute of International Studies
- Spouse: David Korn

Shara L. Aranoff is an American lawyer who was the Chairman of the U.S. International Trade Commission from 2005 to 2014.

== Government service ==
Aranoff was Senior International Trade Counsel on the Democratic staff of the U.S. Senate Committee on Finance, where she was responsible for legislative and policy issues on international trade and investment, including the Trade Act of 2002; negotiations involving the World Trade Organization, the Free Trade Area of the Americas, and numerous free trade agreements; trade remedy laws; Trade Adjustment Assistance; and trade-related environment and labor issues.

From June 1993 until her Senate Finance Committee appointment in January 2001, she served as an Attorney-Advisor in the Office of the General Counsel at the U.S. International Trade Commission. Earlier in her career, Shara Aranoff was an Associate at the Washington, D.C. law firm of Steptoe & Johnson, specializing in international trade and public international law. Prior to that, she served as a judicial clerk for Herbert P. Wilkins, Associate Justice, Massachusetts Supreme Judicial Court.

Aranoff was nominated to the commission by President George W. Bush on April 27, 2005, for the term ending December 16, 2012. Her nomination was confirmed by the U.S. Senate on July 29, 2005, and she was sworn in as a member of the Commission on September 6, 2005. President Bush designated her Vice Chairman of the ITC for the term June 17, 2006 through June 16, 2008. He subsequently named her chairman for the term June 17, 2008, through June 16, 2010.

== Early life and education ==
Originally from Framingham, Massachusetts, Aranoff is married to David Korn; they have two children and reside in Bethesda, Maryland.

Aranoff holds a bachelor of arts degree, from the Woodrow Wilson School of Public and International Affairs at Princeton University. She received her J.D. from Harvard Law School. He attended the Graduate Institute of International Studies, in Geneva, Switzerland as a Fulbright Scholar from 1984 to 1985.

== Selected writings ==
- Industrial Biotechnology
