= Lasercomb America, Inc. v. Reynolds =

Lasercomb Am., Inc. v. Reynolds
- Court: United States Court of Appeals for the Fourth Circuit
- Full case name: Lasercomb America, Inc. v. Job Reynolds; Larry Holliday and Holiday Steel Rule Die Corporation
- Argued: Jan. 8 1990
- Decided: Aug. 16 1990
- Citations: 911 F.2d 970; 15 U.S.P.Q.2d 1846; 59 USLW 2142; 1990-2 Trade Cases 69,145; 1990 Copr. L. Dec. (CCH) ¶ 26,619; 18 Fed.R.Serv.3d 130

Case history
- Prior history: Lasercomb Am. v. Holiday Steel Rule Die Corp., 656 F. Supp. 612, (M.D.N.C. 1987) (awarding summary judgment in favor of Lasercomb on copyright infringement claim).
- Subsequent history: Rehearing and Rehearing En Banc denied on Sep. 27, 1990.

Holding
- Court found the language in Lasercomb's licensing agreement to be anticompetitive and "egregious" and therefore amounted to copyright misuse, which barred it from suing for infringement of its copyright. District court's injunction and award of damages reversed.

Court membership
- Judge sitting: Hiram Emory Widener Austin B. Sprouse Walter E. Hoffman

Laws applied
- 17 U.S.C. § 102(b), 17 U.S.C. § 302(a), 17 U.S.C. § 505.

Lasercomb America, Inc. v. Reynolds, 911 F.2d 970 (4th Cir. 1990) is an appeal filed in the United States Court of Appeals for the Fourth Circuit. Initially, Lasercomb filed an action against Holiday Steel for breach of contract, copyright infringement, misappropriation of trade secrets, fraud, unfair competition, and false designation of origin. The United States District Court ruled in favor of Lasercomb, awarding them punitive damages and actual damages for fraud, rejecting the defense of copyright misuse. On appeal, based on a recognition of the similarity to patent misuse, the holding was reversed, deeming the language contained in the license agreement unreasonable.

== Background Information ==
Larry Holliday and Job Reynolds worked together at Holiday Steel Rule Die Corporation. Larry Holliday was the sole shareholder and president of Holiday Steel and Job Reynolds was a computer programmer for that company. Steel rule die is used in a number of applications including the creation of creases, perforations, slits, and to cut and score paper and cardboard to be folded into cartons or boxes.

Lasercomb America, Inc. was a competitor of Holiday Steel Rule Die Corporation and manufactured steel rule die for similar applications. The object of dispute was a software program developed solely by Lasercomb that eased the production of steel rule die.

Lasercomb developed Computer-Aided Design (CAD) and Computer-Aided Manufacturing (CAM) software known as Interact. The software allowed the user to design a template of a cardboard cutout for visualization on a computer screen. Interact effectively allowed a designer to create and coordinate the production of steel rule die.

Prior to the general release of Lasercomb's Interact program, Lasercomb licensed four pre-release copies to Holiday Steel. The contract stipulated the first licensed copy of Interact would cost $35,000, the second and third $17,500, and the fourth plus any subsequent copies $2,000. In addition, the terms of the license specified that for the ninety-nine year term of the agreement, and for one year thereafter, Holiday Steel "will not write, develop, produce or sell computer assisted die making software, directly or indirectly without Lasercomb's prior written consent."

Holiday Steel, after receiving the pre-release copies, circumvented the protective measures implemented by Lasercomb and made three unauthorized copies of the Interact software. Holiday Steel then proceeded to develop their own software called "PDS-1000," which was "almost entirely a direct copy of Interact, and marketed it as its own CAD/CAM die-making software." With the direction of Holliday, the infringing activities were accomplished by Reynolds.

Lasercomb, after consulting Holiday Steel, implemented "chronoguard" devices that prevented unauthorized access to Interact. Through manipulation and circumvention, Holiday Steel removed the chronoguards without authorization. In doing so, Holiday Steel misrepresented that the chronoguards were in use, even after removal. Once these actions were discovered by Lasercomb, it hastily copyrighted Interact and filed suit against Holiday Steel, Holliday, and Reynolds on March 7, 1986.

== Opinion of the Court ==
While there was no contention that Holliday and Reynolds copied Interact, they claimed that Lasercomb misused its copyright. Holliday and Reynolds asserted that the language in Lasercomb's standard license agreement "restricts licensees from creating any of their own CAD/CAM die-making software…." Specifically, section D of the license states "Licensee agrees during the term of this agreement that it will not permit or suffer its directors, officers and employees, directly or indirectly, to write, develop, produce or sell computer assisted die making software."

The "term of this Agreement," as specified by Lasercomb in the clauses of its license agreement, was ninety-nine years. Holliday and Reynolds could only be bound by the terms of Lasercomb's license agreement if they had assented to it. Lasercomb sent the applicable agreement to Holiday Steel to be signed and returned; however, Larry Holliday did not sign the license agreement. Lasercomb overlooked this fact and still issued the prereleased software to Holiday Steel. The District Court rejected the claim of copyright misuse because the contract clauses had not been explicitly agreed to, "such a clause is reasonable in light of the delicate and sensitive area of computer software," and questioned the existence of such a defense. The District Court granted a permanent injunction against Holiday and awarded collective damages of $120,000 for actual and punitive damages.

The foundational patent misuse case Morton Salt Co. v. G.S. Suppinger, 314 U.S. 488 (1942), involved an analogous situation involving the use of a patent in a manner that contradicted public policy. Such an exercise of contract constituted a misuse of one's patent by restraining an individual's constitutional privileges. At the time, the patent misuse analogy was not established and such a defense was limited to a single case; M. Witmark & Sons v. Jensen, 80 F. Supp. 843 (D.Minn. 1948). It was determined that "since copyright and patent law serve parallel public interests, a ‘misuse' defense should apply to infringement actions brought to vindicate either right." The granted monopoly power of both patent and copyright law does not extend to umbrella property not included in a patent or copyright.

On appeal, the court found that Lasercomb's anticompetitive clauses within its license agreement were a misuse of copyright. Based on the patent misuse analogy, the copyright misuse defense was available to the appellants despite the fact that they had not agreed to the standard license agreement. Therefore, it was determined that Lasercomb should have been restricted from suing for copyright infringement by copyright misuse. The clauses contained in Lasercomb's standard license agreement were a misuse of copyright when suing for infringement of copyright of the Interact program. For these reasons, the appellate court reversed the injunction and reversed the award of copyright infringement damages.

== Case significance ==
The Appellate Court found that the District Court had incorrectly inferred that a copyright misuse may not be a violation of antitrust law. Of more importance, the public policy of copyright laws were being violated by the exercise of Lasercomb's standard license agreement. This Appellate Court's reversal of this case recognizes copyright misuse as an equitable defense to an infringement claim. In doing so, the patent misuse defense in Morton Salt v. G.S. Suppiger was recognized as a legitimate analogy to a misuse of copyright.

== Scholarship ==
Jason Mazzone, Copyfraud, Social Science Research Network (Jun. 29, 2006).

Toshiko Takenaka, Extending the new patent misuse limitation to copyright: Lasercomb America, Inc. v. Reynolds, Center For Computer-Law (1992).

Copyright Misuse Doctrine, Copyright Law - Copyright Misuse.
