= Jennifer A. Hillman =

American lawyer, professor

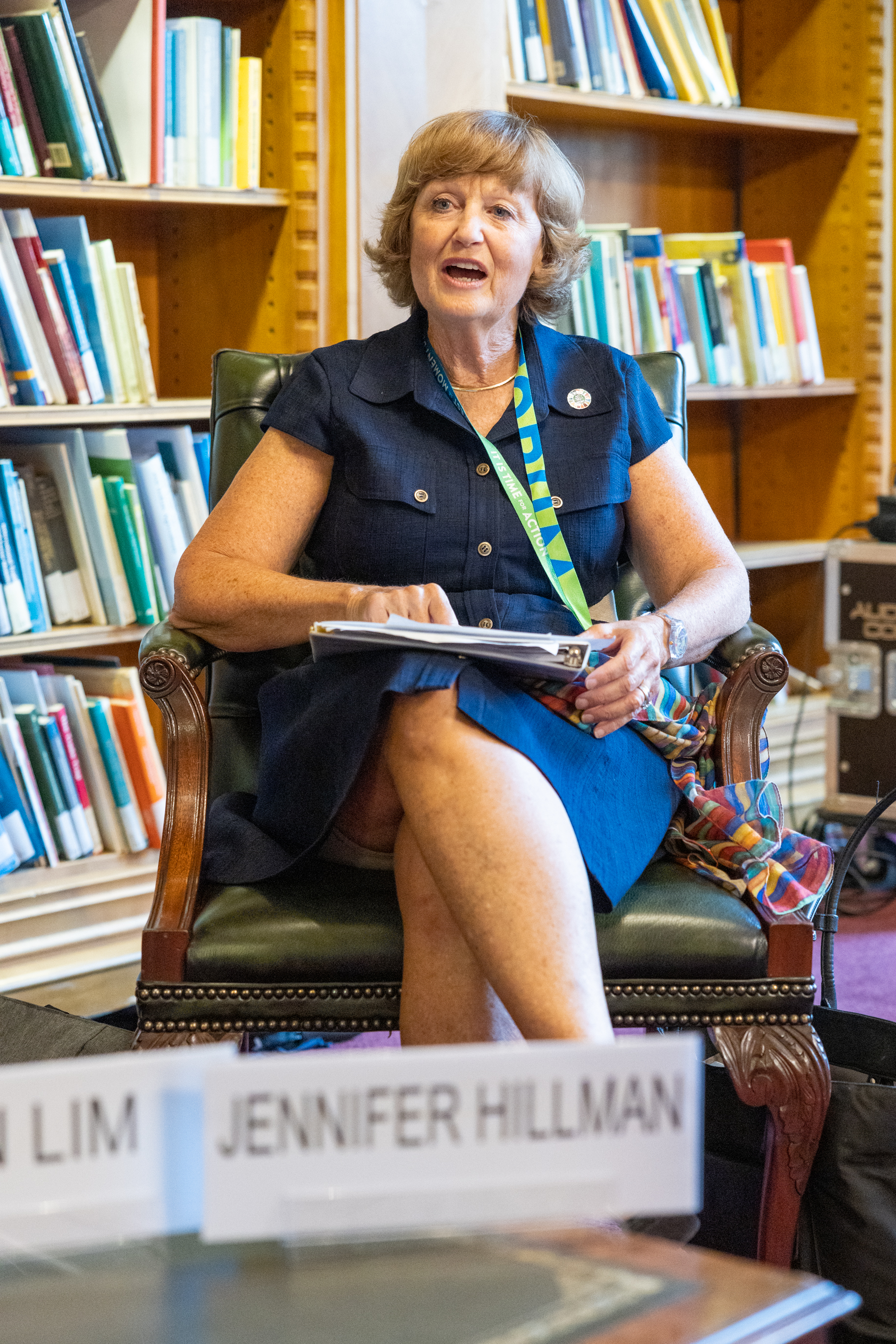
- Born: January 29, 1957 (age 69)
- Education: Duke University (BA, MEd); Harvard Law School (JD)
- Occupation: Law professor
- Employer: Georgetown University Law Center
- Organization: Council on Foreign Relations
- Political party: Democratic
- Spouse: Mitchell Berger
- Children: 2

Jennifer Anne Hillman (born January 29, 1957) is a professor of practice at Georgetown University Law Center. As of 2016 she was working on trade litigation for Cassidy Kent.

== Early career and education ==
She began her professional career as an associate attorney with the firm of Patton, Boggs LLP from 1983 to 1985. Originally from South Bend, Indiana, she earned her B.A. in political science in 1978 and a Master of Education degree in higher education administration in 1979 from Duke University. She earned her J.D. from Harvard Law School in 1983.

== Experience and fields of interest ==
Hillman's career focuses on international trade and investment, financial services and the adjudication of international economic disputes. She served 2007-2011 as one of seven judges from around the world on the World Trade Organization’s (WTO) highest court, its Appellate Body, where she helped adjudicate 20 disputes involving a wide variety of legal obligations, ranging from claims arising from subsidies to Airbus, Boeing and US cotton producers, to regulations over trade in agriculture products, to antidumping disputes, to claims regarding the nature and extent of China's WTO accession commitments.

Hillman has experience adjudicating antidumping, countervailing duty, patent and safeguards cases as a result of her nine-year service as a Commissioner at the United States International Trade Commission, from 1998 to 2007. She was vice-chair from 2002 to 2004. Through her work as the General Counsel at the Office of the United States Trade Representative from 1995 to 1997, Hillman was involved in all litigation matters in which the United States was a party or third party in disputes before panels of the NAFTA or the WTO. She negotiated mutually acceptable agreements with over 45 countries while serving as USTR's Ambassador and Chief Textiles Negotiator from 1993 to 1995. She had worked on the Clinton transition in 1992–1993.

Hillman served as Legislative Director and Counsel from 1988 to 1992 for U.S. Senator Terry Sanford, responsible for trade issues, as well as matters coming before the Committee on Banking, Housing and Urban Affairs. She worked on his campaigns in 1986 and 1992 and joined his staff in 1987.

She is a professor of practice at Georgetown University Law Center, teaching courses on international economic law, including international trade, investment and international business transactions. As of 2016, she was also a partner at Cassidy Levy Kent, working on trade litigation.

== Personal life ==
She resides in Washington, D.C., with her husband, Mitchell Berger, and their two sons.
