= Brulotte v. Thys Co. =

- Supreme Court of the United States

Argued October 20, 1964 Decided November 16, 1964
- Full case name: Brulotte, et al. v. Thys Co.
- Citations: 379 U.S. 29 (more) 85 S.Ct. 176; 13 L. Ed. 2d 99; 3 A.L.R.3d 761; 143 U.S.P.Q. 264

Case history
- Prior: Thys Co. v. Brulotte, 62 Wn.2d 284, 382 P.2d 271 (1963); cert. granted, 376 U.S. 905 (1964).

Court membership
- Chief Justice Earl Warren Associate Justices Hugo Black · William O. Douglas; Tom C. Clark · John M. Harlan II; William J. Brennan Jr. · Potter Stewart; Byron White · Arthur Goldberg

Case opinions
- Majority: Douglas, joined by Warren, Black, Clark, Brennan, Stewart, White, Goldberg
- Dissent: Harlan

Brulotte v. Thys Co., 379 U.S. 29 (1964), was a Supreme Court of the United States decision holding that a contract calling for payment of patent royalties after the expiration of the licensed patent was misuse of the patent right and unenforceable under the Supremacy Clause, state contract law notwithstanding. The decision was widely subjected to academic criticism but the Supreme Court has rejected that criticism and reaffirmed the Brulotte decision in Kimble v. Marvel Entertainment, LLC.

== Background ==
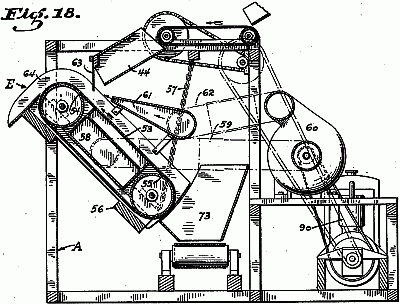
Patented hops-picking machine of Thys

Thys owned patents on hop-picking machinery. He sold a machine to Brulotte, a farmer in Washington, for $3000 and granted him a license to use the machine for a minimum royalty of $500 for each hop-picking season or $3.33 per 200 pounds of hops harvested by the machine, whichever was greater. The license had no termination date. Of the seven patents covering the machine, the last expired by 1957. Brulotte failed to pay the royalties and Thys sued him for breach of contract in Washington State court.

The trial court rendered judgment for Thys and the Supreme Court of Washington affirmed. The Supreme Court of Washington held that in the present case the period during which royalties were required, even though beyond the expiry of the patents, was only "a reasonable amount of time over which to spread the payments for the use of the patent[s]."

== Ruling of Supreme Court ==
The Supreme Court reversed (8-1) in an opinion written for the Court by Justice William O. Douglas. Justice John Marshall Harlan II dissented.

=== Majority opinion ===
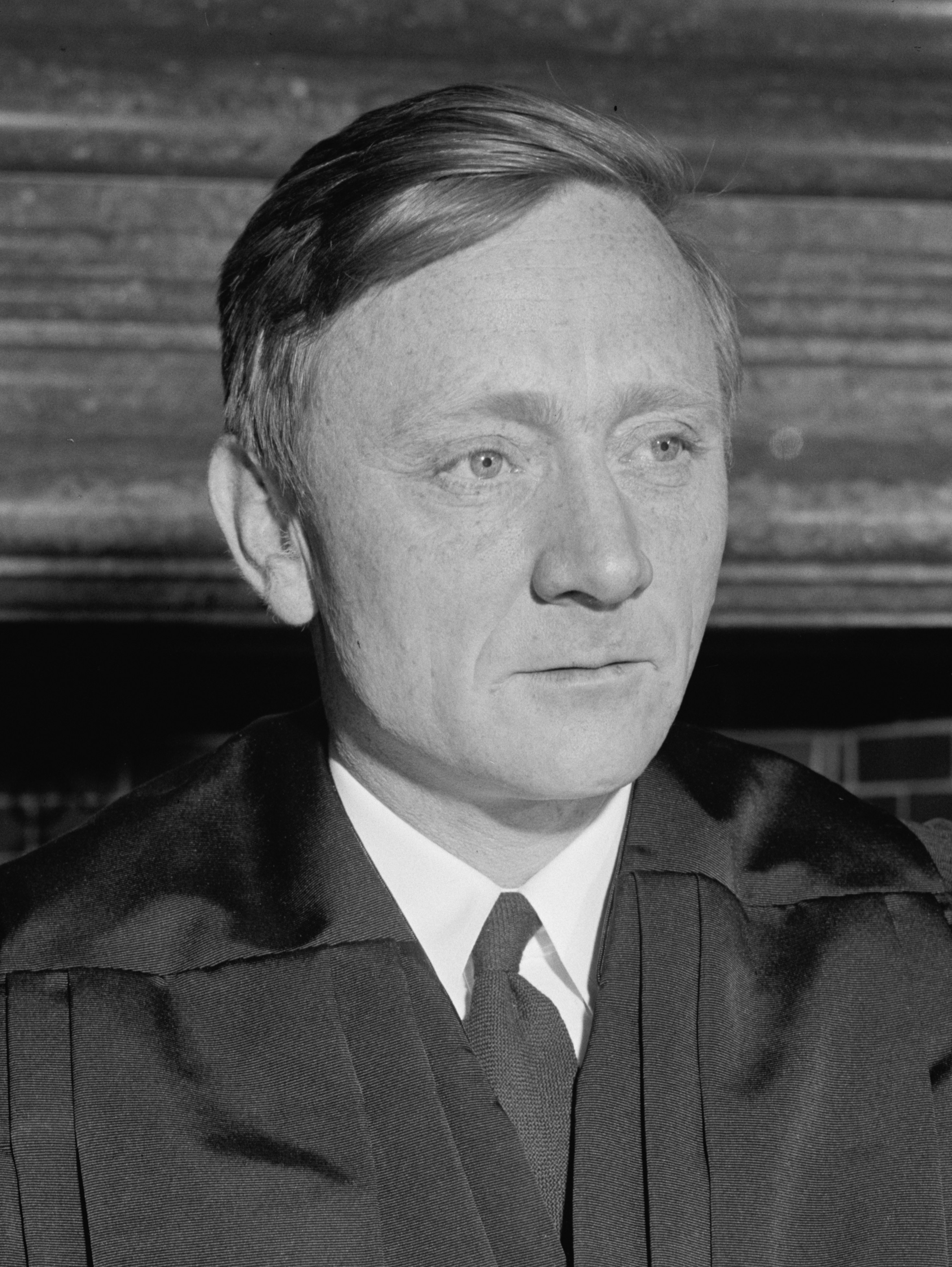
Justice William O. Douglas

Justice Douglas began the majority opinion by citing precedents holding that patent "rights become public property once the 17-year period expires." He then quoted Chief Justice Stone, speaking for the Court in Scott Paper Co. v. Marcalus Co.:

. . . any attempted reservation or continuation in the patentee or those claiming under him of the patent monopoly, after the patent expires, whatever the legal device employed, runs counter to the policy and purpose of the patent laws.

The Court rejected the claim that the contract merely spread the payment for using the patent over a longer period. The payments were clearly proportioned to the extent of use after the patents expired: "The royalty payments due for the post-expiration period are by their terms for use during that period, and are not deferred payments for use during the pre-expiration period." Thys "was using the licenses to project its monopoly beyond the patent period." Because the license made no distinction between the pre- and post-expiration period, the contracts were "on their face a bald attempt to exact the same terms and conditions for the period after the patents have expired as they do for the monopoly period," contrary to patent policy. That made them unenforceable.

The Court therefore ruled:

n light of those considerations, we conclude that a patentee's use of a royalty agreement that projects beyond the expiration date of the patent is unlawful per se. If that device were available to patentees, the free market visualized for the post-expiration period would be subject to monopoly influences that have no proper place there.

. . . A patent empowers the owner to exact royalties as high as he can negotiate with the leverage of that monopoly. But to use that leverage to project those royalty payments beyond the life of the patent is analogous to an effort to enlarge the monopoly of the patent by tieing the sale or use of the patented article to the purchase or use of unpatented ones. The exaction of royalties for use of a machine after the patent has expired is an assertion of monopoly power in the post-expiration period when, as we have seen, the patent has entered the public domain. . . . [A]fter expiration of the last of the patents incorporated in the machines "the grant of patent monopoly was spent" and . . . an attempt to project it into another term by continuation of the licensing agreement is unenforceable.

=== Dissent ===
Justice Harlan disagreed: " I think that more discriminating analysis than the Court has seen fit to give this case produces a different result." In his analysis, what Thys did was no more objectionable than restrictions on the machine rather than the patented idea that it embodied. "In fact Thys sells both a machine and the use of an idea. The company should be free to restrict the use of its machine."

== Subsequent developments ==
=== Reaffirmance ===
Despite criticism of Brulotte (see next section), the Supreme Court reaffirmed the decision in Kimble v. Marvel in 2015.

=== Criticism ===
The decision was widely criticized by academics and economic theorists. In a subsequent opinion, 50 years later, nonetheless affirming Brulotte, the Supreme Court listed some of the criticism suggesting that the case should be overruled:

- Scheiber v. Dolby Labs., Inc., 293 F. 3d 1014, 1017–1018 (CA7 2002) (Posner, J.) (Brulotte has been "severely, and as it seems to us, with all due respect, justly criticized . . . . However, we have no authority to overrule a Supreme Court decision no matter how dubious its reasoning strikes us, or even how out of touch with the Supreme Court’s current thinking the decision seems")
- Ayres & Klemperer, Limiting Patentees’ Market Power Without Reducing Innovation Incentives: The Perverse Benefits of Uncertainty and Non-Injunctive Remedies, 97 Mich. L. Rev. 985, 1027 (1999) ("Our analysis . . . suggests that Brulotte should be overruled").

Other criticism of Brulotte includes the following:

- Harold See and Frank M. Caprio, The Trouble with Brulotte: The Patent Royalty Term and Patent Monopoly Extension, 1990 Utah L. Rev. 813 (1990).
- Note, Patents: Supreme Court Holds Post-Expiration Royalty Agreements Unlawful Per Se, 1965 Duke L.J. 836, 841 (1965) ("Thus, the ambiguity in Brulotte, so long as it remains unresolved, may greatly limit marketing available to [patentees].").
- Paul Goldstein, Federal System Ordering of the Copyright Interest, 69 Colum. L. Rev. 49, 70 (1969) (" In the presence of only the most attenuated federal interest, and absent any generalized public concern, the Brulotte rule gives to the federal courts a broad and probably illegitimate supervisory power over state administration of private contracts.").
- Richard A. Posner. Transaction Costs and Antitrust Concerns in the Licensing of Intellectual Property, 4 J. Marshall Rev. Intell. Prop. L. 325, 332 (2005) ("Brulotte does not reflect the Supreme Court's current thinking about competition and monopoly, but it will continue to bind the lower courts until the Supreme Court decides to overrule it.").

Other commentators, however, have rejected adoption of an antitrust lens for analysis of patent misuse:

- Robin C. Feldman, The Insufficiency of Antitrust Analysis for Patent Misuse, 55 Hastings L.J. 399, 422 (2003) ("the antitrust rule of reason focuses on one particular issue: the impact on competition, rather than all possible equitable considerations" relevant to patent policy); id. at 448 ("A behavior that retards the progress of science would be of concern to patent policy" but antitrust tests are not attuned to this type of problem.")
- Marshall Leaffer, Patent Misuse and Innovation, 10 J. High Tech. L. 142, 148 (2010) ("patent misuse should transcend the contours of traditional antitrust law and should concern itself with policy of patent law and the effect on innovation").
