= Patent misuse =

Improper use of patent rights

In United States patent law, patent misuse is a patent holder's use of a patent to restrain trade beyond enforcing the exclusive rights that a lawfully obtained patent provides. If a court finds that a patent holder committed patent misuse, the court may rule that the patent holder has lost the right to enforce the patent. Patent misuse that restrains economic competition substantially can also violate United States antitrust law.

== Definition ==
Patent misuse is a patent owner's improper use of patent rights, speaking very generally, to expand the scope or term of the patent. Examples of such patent misuse include forcing customers to agree to pay royalties on unpatented products or to pay royalties on an expired patent. This particular type of patent misuse can take place without a violation of antitrust laws. But it violates such policies of US patent law as the monopoly of a patent is confined to what its claims cover and once a patent expires the public has an unlimited right to practice the formerly claimed subject matter.

Patent misuse may also occur when the patentee's conduct is a violation of antitrust laws. For example, a company buying all the patents in a given field (relevant market) to stall competition would be misusing patents, and (assuming other statutory requirements are met) also violating section 7 of the Clayton Act (15 U.S.C. § 18) and section 2 of the Sherman Act (15 U.S.C. § 2). Other antitrust patent misuse includes (again assuming that other statutory requirements are met) a licensor's exercising control over the price that several licensees charge for a product or service; attempting to enforce a patent that the patentee knows to be invalid or not infringed; and selling patented goods on the condition, agreement, or understanding that the buyer will not deal in the goods of a competitor of the seller.

== History ==
In the early 20th century, patent misuse was not yet a well recognized defense to patent infringement, although it had been recognized in Adams v. Burke in 1873. Courts at that time recognized relatively few limitations to patentees' rights. In 1912, the Supreme Court did not recognize a doctrine of patent misuse in Henry v. A.B. Dick Co., a case in which a patent license was tied to a purchase of another product. According to the Court, because a patent owner had the greater right to withhold its patented product from market entirely, it had the inherent lesser right to selectively withhold it from people who did not purchase other products.

This inherent-right doctrine was expressly rejected a few years later, however, in Motion Picture Patents Co. v. Universal Film Mfg. Co. In that case, Justice Holmes (who had been in the majority in the A.B. Dick case), now in dissent, argued that because the owner of a patented teapot "may keep his device wholly out of use . . . I cannot understand why he may not keep it out of use unless the licensee, or, for the matter of that, the buyer" will agree to buy his tea from the patent owner. But the majority rejected this doctrine of patentees' "inherent rights." It explained:

[T]he argument [is] that, since the patentee may withhold his patent altogether from public use, he must logically and necessarily be permitted to impose any conditions which he chooses upon any use which he may allow of it. The defect in this thinking springs from the substituting of inference and argument for the language of the statute, and from failure to distinguish between the rights which are given to the inventor by the patent law and which he may assert against all the world through an infringement proceeding, and rights which he may create for himself by private contract, which, however, are subject to the rules of general, as distinguished from those of the patent, law. While it is true that, under the statutes as they were (and now are), a patentee might withhold his patented machine from public use, yet, if he consented to use it himself or through others, such use immediately fell within the terms of the statute, and, as we have seen, he is thereby restricted to the use of the invention as it is described in the claims of his patent, and not as it may be expanded by limitations as to materials and supplies necessary to the operation of it, imposed by mere notice to the public.

A year after the A.B. Dick case, in Bauer & Cie. v. O'Donnell, the Supreme Court began to shift its perspective by holding that, although patentees could control manufacturing, use, and sale of patented products with license agreements, they could not use license agreements to control the resale price of patented products the patentee sold. After the Motion Picture Patents case, the tide began to run more strongly against restrictive patent practices.

== Case law ==
=== Origins and development ===
In 1917, the Supreme Court reversed the four-year-old Henry v. A.B. Dick Co. decision and established patent misuse as an affirmative defense to copyright infringement. In Motion Picture Patents Co. v. Universal Film Mfg. Co., the Supreme Court held that requiring a patented film projector only be used for screening films authorized by the patent holder was unenforceable and constituted patent misuse. The Court concluded that the patentee's attempt to extend its monopoly power beyond the rights that the patent statute conferred on it was inequitable, and because of the patentee's "unclean hands", the court, as a court of equity, would not grant it relief. In explaining its ruling, the Court said:

[W]e are convinced that the exclusive right granted in every patent must be limited to the invention described in the claims of the patent, and that it is not competent for the owner of a patent, by notice attached to its machine, to in effect extend the scope of its patent monopoly by restricting the use of it to materials necessary in its operation, but which are no part of the patented invention, or to send its machines forth into the channels of trade of the country subject to conditions as to use or royalty to be paid, to be imposed thereafter at the discretion of such patent owner. The patent law furnishes no warrant for such a practice, and the cost, inconvenience, and annoyance to the public which the opposite conclusion would occasion forbid it.

Carbice Corp. v. American Patents Development Corp., clarified that requiring patent licensees to buy other products as a condition of a patent license ("product tying") was misuse. American Patents Development Corp. held a patent for a dry ice transport enclosure. It required its customers only use their enclosure to transport dry ice from their exclusive distributor. The Supreme Court held that using patents to control an enclosure purchaser's other product purchases was patent misuse. (In a separate case a few months later, the Supreme Court held that Carbice's patent was invalid.)

The Supreme Court held that patent misuse made the patent unenforceable regarding monetary relief in Morton Salt Co. v. G.S. Suppiger Co. Suppiger Co. owned a patent on salt-tablet dispensing machines that it manufactured. The sales agreement for the machines required customers to purchase salt tablets exclusively from Suppiger. Morton Salt Co., a competitor that also sold salt tablets, manufactured and leased dispensing machines that infringed Suppiger's patent. The Supreme Court denied Suppiger Co. compensation for Morton Salt's infringement, holding that Suppiger's patent was unenforceable because it was using it to restrain competition in unpatented salt. The Court said its ruling would not be different if Morton Salt were not Suppiger's competitor. The Court added that misuse could be found in conduct falling short of an antitrust violation.

Brulotte v Thys Co., established that attempting to collect royalties after a patent expired was misuse. Mr. Brulotte purchased a hop-harvesting machine from Thys Co. Upon purchase, Brulotte accepted a licensing agreement which required annual royalty payments beyond the duration of the Thys patent. When Brulotte realized that the terms of the contract exceeded the duration of the patent, he stopped paying the royalties. The Supreme Court held that the contract between Brulotte and Thys was not enforceable once the last licensed patent expired, because the license extended the term of patent protection beyond the duration of the patent. In June 2015, the Supreme Court reaffirmed the Brulotte case.

In Zenith Radio Corp. v. Hazeltine Research, Inc. the Supreme Court established that demanding a percentage of a licensees patented and non-patented product sales in exchange for a license was misuse. Hazeltine Research required Zenith pay a total percentage of all its sales to license Hazeltine's patents. The court ruled that this license requirement was patent misuse, even though it might not be an antitrust violation because the anticompetive impact may have been too slight. This holding reaffirmed a line of Supreme Court patent misuse decisions holding that the competitive impact of a restrictive practice might fall short of an antitrust violation and nonetheless be misuse.

Other forms of patent misuse recognized by courts of appeals decisions but not addressed in detail as yet by the Supreme Court include:

- Tying the purchase of unpatented materials as a condition of a patent license, where the effect is substantially anticompetitive in a relevant market over which the patent has market power.
- Tying one patent license to another, where the tying patent has market power.
- Requiring a licensee not to make a competitive product as a condition of a patent license.
- Requiring a licensee to assign back or exclusively license back subsequent related patents, where the effect is substantially anticompetitive.
- Licensor's giving licensees veto power over additional licenses.

=== Recent changes ===
Windsurfing v. AMF held that a patent misuse defense must show that the patentee's behavior hurts competition. This case also clarified that if the Supreme Court had already held a particular licensing arrangement was misuse, the infringer did not have to establish that it was anticompetitive. However, if the Supreme Court had not spoken on the licensing agreement, the infringer has to establish the agreement hurts competition. A few months later, however, the Federal Circuit retreated from Windsurfing in Senza-Gel Corp. v. Seiffhart. In response to a certified question, the court recognized that "as the Supreme Court has said, the patentee's act may constitute patent misuse without rising to the level of an antitrust violation." Citing the contrary suggestion in Windsurfing, the court explained:

Commentators and courts have questioned the rationale appearing in Supreme Court opinions dealing with misuse in view of recent economic theory and Supreme Court decisions in non-misuse contexts. We are bound, however, to adhere to existing Supreme Court guidance in the area until otherwise directed by Congress or by the Supreme Court.

In Princo Corp. v. International Trade Commission, the Federal Circuit held that violations of antitrust law involving patents are not always patent misuse. Philips, Sony and other manufacturers developed patented technology to create CDs that could be rewritten multiple times (CD-RWs). Philips licensed these patents to CD player and reader manufacturers (so they could develop CD players and readers that worked with CD-RWs). Princo Corp., one of the licensees, stopped paying royalty fees to Philips, but continued to manufacture readable discs using Phillips technology. Phillips filed a complaint with the International Trade Commission and Princo responded claiming that Sony and Phillips were using their patents to suppress competition. On appeal, an en banc the Federal Circuit Court of Appeals held that Sony and Phillips had not expanded the scope of their patent in a way prohibited by previous Supreme Court cases. Namely, the violation allegedly did not "leverage" the patent at hand. According to one commentator, patent scholars have speculated that this opinion will significantly narrow the scope of misuse.

In Kimble v. Marvel Entertainment, LLC, on June 22, 2015, the Supreme Court refused to overrule Brulotte v. Thys Co., because of stare decisis. The Court pointed out that "Congress has spurned multiple opportunities to reverse Brulotte," and "Congress has rebuffed bills that would have replaced Brulotte's per se rule with the same antitrust-style analysis Kimble now urges." Moreover, the Court maintained, there was not a good reason to overrule Brulotte: "Brulotte's statutory and doctrinal underpinnings have not eroded over time." The patent statute at issue in Brulotte is essentially unchanged. The precedents on which the Brulotte Court relied, like other decisions enforcing a patent's cutoff date, remain good law. And Brulotte's "close relation to a whole web of [other] precedents means that reversing it could threaten others."

In addition, the Court rejected Kimble's arguments that the Brulotte doctrine should be overturned because the practice it outlaws is not anticompetive and it does not violate the antitrust laws. The Court found this argument beside the point: "But Brulotte is a patent rather than an antitrust case," it insisted. Under the Court's legal analysis, "[P]atent (not antitrust) policy gave rise to the Court's conclusion that post-patent royalty contracts are unenforceable—utterly 'regardless of a demonstrable effect on competition.'" Earlier in its opinion, the Court explained that it was well-settled that it was "patent law's policy [to] establish[] a 'post-expiration . . . public domain' in which every person can make free use of a formerly patented product." The majority opinion is thus a strong rebuke to those analysts that seek to make the misuse doctrine a kind of petty antitrust law, in which antitrust principles of analysis dominate over policies unique to patent law; Kimble reaffirms many prior Supreme Court decisions that hold that misuse may be found in conduct that does not violate the antitrust laws.

== Congressional limits to patent misuse ==
Congress limited the patent misuse affirmative defense in both 1952 and 1998, resulting in 35 U.S.C. § 271(d) of the Patent Act.

=== Overhaul of the Patent Act in 1952 ===
In 1952, Congress added provisions to the Patent Act explicitly exempting from patent misuse merely charging royalties, licensing, and suing to enforce patents against contributory infringement. These provisions are in 35 U.S.C. § 271(d).

=== Patent Misuse Reform Act of 1988 ===
In 1988, Congress enacted legislation that narrowed the scope of the patent misuse by creating safe harbors for patent holders in 35 U.S.C. § 271(d). It clarified that patentees did not misuse their patents by suing people creating products which could be used to infringement patents (contributory infringement). Requiring people to buy another license or product to obtain a patented product is also not misuse, unless the patentee holds "market power."

== Remedy ==
Most types of misuse can be erased (or "purged") so the patent is valid again by abandoning the misusing practice and causing its effects to fully dissipate. Fraud or inequitable conduct in acquiring patents, however, is not purgeable.

== Criticisms and support ==
Critics of the patent misuse defense argue it is anachronistic, that it should be limited by the antitrust rule of reason, and that it has been narrowed to oblivion since 1988 by court rulings like Princo Corp. v. International Trade Commission. Proponents of the patent misuse defense suggest it could be a defense against litigation brought by patent trolls. Use of this doctrine to contest patent infringement suits by non-practicing entities may require the courts to challenge precedent set in Continental Paper Bag Co. v. Eastern Paper Bag Co. The Supreme Court rejected some of this criticism in Kimble v. Marvel, which reaffirmed Brulotte v. Thys Co. and asserted that misuse is governed by patent policy rather than antitrust policy.

=== The "Nine No-No's" Controversy ===
In November 1970. Bruce Wilson, then a Deputy Assistant Attorney General in the Justice Department's Antitrust Division, gave a speech in Boston that came to be known as the "Nine No-No's." Wilson repeated the "No-No's" speech several more times, and an impression was created that it reflected the Antitrust Division's litigation policy. It has been debated whether the No-No's "reflected actual Department of Justice antitrust policy," despite Wilson's assertion that the so-called No-No's are restraints "which in virtually all cases are going to lead to antitrust trouble because of their adverse effect upon competition." Two other former Deputy Assistant Attorneys General from the Antitrust Division commented:

In actuality, of the sixteen cases filed by the division's Intellectual Property Section between the late 1960s and the late 1970s, only half specifically addressed any of the nine practices. Moreover, almost all of these cases were litigated under a rule of reason rather than per se illegality.

Although it therefore appears that the No-No's were never more than an informal antitrust prosecutors' check-list, and were not advanced much less pressed in litigation as a proposed rule of antitrust law, they were widely denounced. For example, during the Bush administration, government officials distanced themselves from them. Thus, in 2003 the official then heading the Antitrust Division spoke out strongly against the No-No's as valid enforcement guidelines. He then spoke of how the "No-No" practices actually often benefited competition; for example:

- Tie-ins of unpatented supplies "could minimize the risks associated with the uncertainty that a patent owner may have regarding the value of his/her patented technology."
- "Compulsory payment of royalties in amounts not reasonably related to sales of the patented product . . . might be far more efficient, for example, to [use to] base royalties upon the total units produced by the licensee."
- "Licensee veto power over the licensor's grant of further licenses . . . may have a net procompetitive effect."

Another commentator during this period said with approval, "The Agencies have come a long way since the days of the Nine No-Nos."

In retrospect, the Nine No-No's controversy appears to have been overblown, and the aims of its proponents exaggerated. The Antitrust Division's retreat from it and emphasis on whether the restrictive No-No actually had any anticompetitive effects in the marketplace, may properly be considered in light of the Zenith and Kimble cases' distinctions between antitrust and patent misuse based on their different respective policies. Considered in that light, the No-No's may properly state patent misuse policy. But in large part they did not state a viable antitrust enforcement policy. That appears to be the conclusion drawn in recent papers by Professor Hovenkamp. Thus, the Nine No-No's controversy informs us more about patent misuse than it does about antitrust policy, for Wilson's assertions that the No-No's likely spell antitrust trouble have proven not supported by events.

== See also ==
- Copyright misuse
- Evergreening
- Inequitable conduct
- Patent ambush
- Patent troll
- Submarine patent
- Qualcomm#Apple
