= Kimble v. Marvel Entertainment, LLC =

- Supreme Court of the United States

Argued March 31, 2015 Decided June 22, 2015
- Full case name: Kimble et al. v. Marvel Entertainment, LLC, successor to Marvel Enterprises, Inc.
- Docket no.: 13-720
- Citations: 576 U.S. 446 (more) 135 S. Ct. 2401; 192 L. Ed. 2d 463; 2015 U.S. LEXIS 4067; 83 U.S.L.W. 4531; 114 U.S.P.Q.2d 1941

Holding
- Contracts that restrict free public access to formerly patented, as well as unpatentable, inventions are unenforceable. Earlier decision in Brulotte v Thys Co. affirmed.

Court membership
- Chief Justice John Roberts Associate Justices Antonin Scalia · Anthony Kennedy; Clarence Thomas · Ruth Bader Ginsburg; Stephen Breyer · Samuel Alito; Sonia Sotomayor · Elena Kagan

Case opinions
- Majority: Kagan, joined by Scalia, Kennedy, Ginsburg, Breyer, Sotomayor
- Dissent: Alito, joined by Roberts, Thomas

Kimble v. Marvel Entertainment, LLC, 576 U.S. 446 (2015), is a significant decision of the United States Supreme Court for several reasons. One is that the Court turned back a considerable amount of academic criticism of both the patent misuse doctrine as developed by the Supreme Court and the particular legal principle at issue in the case. Another is that the Court firmly rejected efforts to assimilate the patent misuse doctrine to antitrust law and explained in some detail the different policies at work in the two bodies of law. Finally, the majority and dissenting opinions informatively articulate two opposing views of the proper role of the doctrine of stare decisis in US law.

The narrow issue in Kimble v. Marvel was whether the Court should overrule the 50-year-old proposition in Brulotte v. Thys Co., 379 U.S. 29 (1964), that a patent license agreement requiring royalties for the period beyond the life of the licensed patent was unenforceable under the Supremacy Clause, state contract law notwithstanding, because it involved a misuse of patent rights. The Supreme Court in the Kimble case refused to overrule Brulotte and its doctrine against post-expiry royalties.

== Criticism of Brulotte ==
In 1964 the Supreme Court decided Brulotte v. Thys Co., in which it held that a contract to pay patent royalties beyond the expiration of the patent was unenforceable. The decision was widely criticized in academic circles and by the patent bar, as well as in lower court decisions. The thrust of the criticism was that the patent misuse doctrine should be based on antitrust law principles, and that conduct without a significant anticompetitive effect should not be proscribed.

In its opinion in the Kimble case, the Supreme Court listed some of the criticism suggesting that the Brulotte decision was wrong and should be overruled:

- Scheiber v. Dolby Labs., Inc., 293 F. 3d 1014, 1017–1018 (CA7 2002) (Posner, J.) (Brulotte has been "severely, and as it seems to us, with all due respect, justly criticized . . . However, we have no authority to overrule a Supreme Court decision no matter how dubious its reasoning strikes us, or even how out of touch with the Supreme Court's current thinking the decision seems")
- Ayres & Klemperer, Limiting Patentees' Market Power Without Reducing Innovation Incentives: The Perverse Benefits of Uncertainty and Non-Injunctive Remedies, 97 Mich. L. Rev. 985, 1027 (1999) ("Our analysis . . . suggests that Brulotte should be overruled").

Other criticism of Brulotte includes the following:

- Harold See and Frank M. Caprio, The Trouble with Brulotte: The Patent Royalty Term and Patent Monopoly Extension, 1990 Utah L. Rev. 813 (1990).
- Note, Patents: Supreme Court Holds Post-Expiration Royalty Agreements Unlawful Per Se, 1965 Duke L.J. 836, 841 (1965) ("Thus, the ambiguity in Brulotte, so long as it remains unresolved, may greatly limit marketing available to [patentees].").
- Paul Goldstein, Federal System Ordering of the Copyright Interest, 69 Colum. L. Rev. 49, 70 (1969) (" In the presence of only the most attenuated federal interest, and absent any generalized public concern, the Brulotte rule gives to the federal courts a broad and probably illegitimate supervisory power over state administration of private contracts.").
- Richard A. Posner. Transaction Costs and Antitrust Concerns in the Licensing of Intellectual Property, 4 J. Marshall Rev. Intell. Prop. L. 325, 332 (2005) ("Brulotte does not reflect the Supreme Court's current thinking about competition and monopoly, but it will continue to bind the lower courts until the Supreme Court decides to overrule it.").
- In addition, decisions of the Federal Circuit have held that a patent cannot be held to have been misused without a showing of substantial anticompetitive effects, except where the Supreme Court has expressly ruled otherwise.

Other commentators, however, have rejected adoption of an antitrust lens for analysis of patent misuse:

- Robin C. Feldman, The Insufficiency of Antitrust Analysis for Patent Misuse, 55 Hastings L.J. 399, 422 (2003) ("the antitrust rule of reason focuses on one particular issue: the impact on competition, rather than all possible equitable considerations" relevant to patent policy); id. at 448 ("A behavior that retards the progress of science would be of concern to patent policy" but antitrust tests are not attuned to this type of problem.")
- Marshall Leaffer, Patent Misuse and Innovation, 10 J. High Tech. L. 142, 148 (2010) ("patent misuse should transcend the contours of traditional antitrust law and should concern itself with policy of patent law and the effect on innovation").

== Background ==
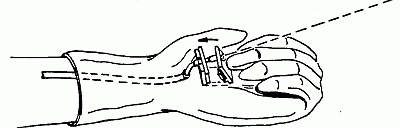
Drawing of patented device in patent

In 1990, plaintiff Stephen Kimble obtained U.S. Patent No. 5,072,856 on a toy that allows children and other persons interested in role-playing as "Spider-Man" to shoot a spider web—really, pressurized foam string—"from the palm of [the] hand."

Defendant Marvel Entertainment, LLC makes and markets products featuring Spider-Man. Kimble sought to sell or license his patent to Marvel's corporate predecessor and met with its president to negotiate a contract. But the company instead began marketing the "Web Blaster"—a toy that, like Kimble's patented invention, enables users to mimic Spider-Man by shooting foam string. Kimble sued Marvel in 1997, alleging breach of contract and patent infringement. The parties settled that litigation and Marvel agreed to purchase Kimble's patent in exchange for a lump sum (of about a half-million dollars) and a 3% running royalty on Marvel's future sales of the Web Blaster and similar products. The parties set no end date for royalties, apparently contemplating that they would continue for as long as customers wanted to buy the product.

Marvel subsequently learned of the Brulotte decision and realized that under the Brulotte doctrine it was not obliged to pay royalties after the patent expired. Kimble sued Marvel for breach of contract and Marvel counterclaimed for a declaration that it was no longer obligated to pay Kimble after the patent expired. Marvel prevailed in the litigation.

The Ninth Circuit reluctantly affirmed. It said:

The . . . criticism [of Brulotte] is particularly apt in this case. The patent leverage in this case was vastly overshadowed by what were likely non-patent rights, and Kimble may have been able to obtain a higher royalty rate had the parties understood that the royalty payments would stop when the patent expired. Nonetheless, Brulotte and its progeny are controlling. We are bound to follow Brulotte and cannot deny that it applies here.

== Supreme Court ruling ==
The Supreme Court affirmed the judgment below, 6-3, largely on stare decisis grounds, but in the course of its ruling the Court explained why the Brulotte decision was correct and its critics wrong, as to the substantive law.

=== Majority opinion ===
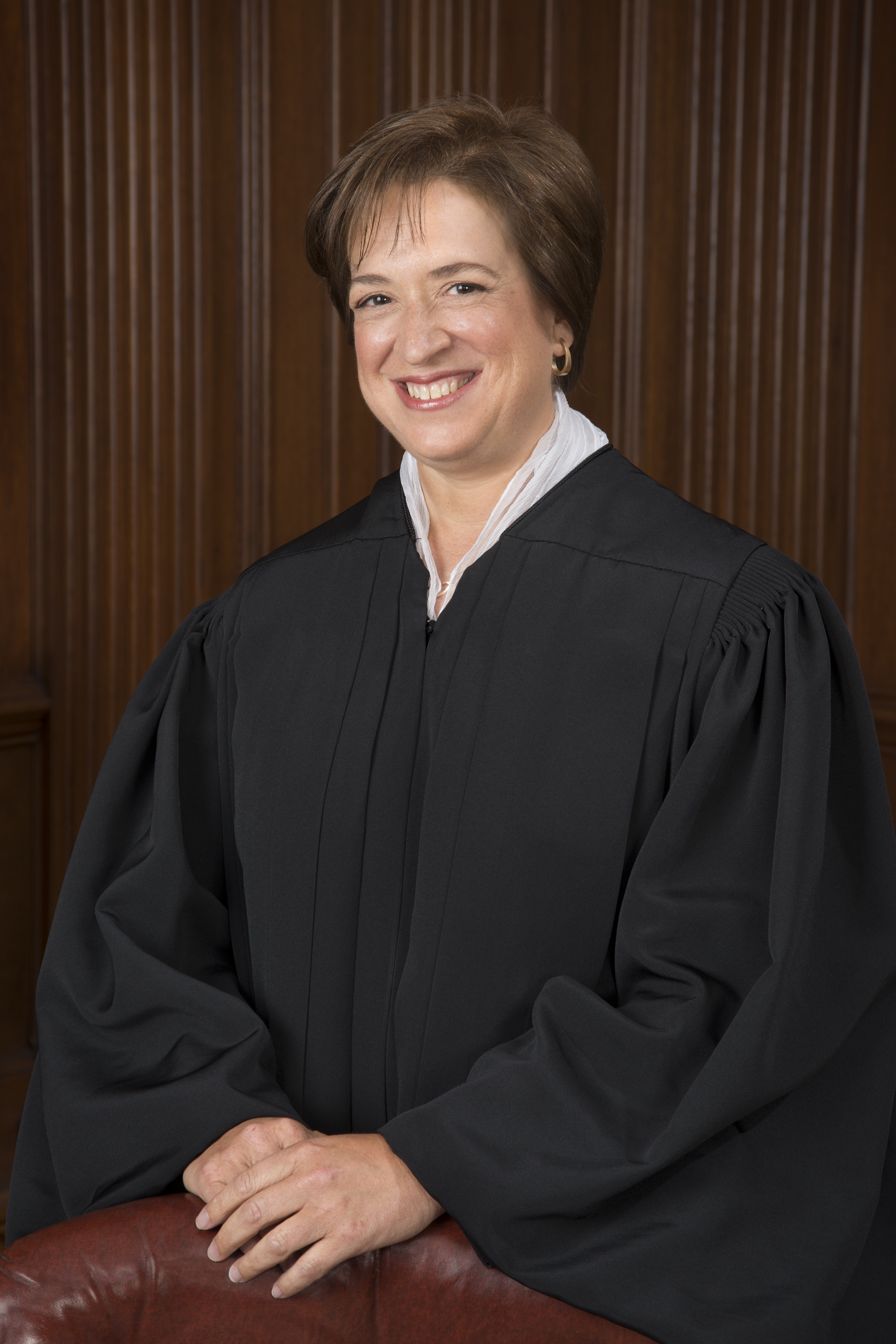
Justice Kagan

The majority opinion by Justice Elena Kagan began by explaining how the US patent system reflects a congressional "balance between fostering innovation and ensuring public access to discoveries." Consequently, once the statutory term of the patent monopoly ends, "the right to make or use the article, free from all restriction, passes to the public."

The Court elaborated the point:

In case after case, the Court has construed those laws to preclude measures that restrict free access to formerly patented, as well as unpatentable, inventions. In one line of cases, we have struck down state statutes with that consequence. By virtue of federal law, we reasoned, "an article on which the patent has expired," like an unpatentable article, "is in the public domain and may be made and sold by whoever chooses to do so." In a related line of decisions, we have deemed unenforceable private contract provisions limiting free use of such inventions. . . .[F]or example, we determined that a manufacturer could not agree to refrain from challenging a patent's validity. Allowing even a single company to restrict its use of an expired or invalid patent, we explained, "would deprive ... the consuming public of the advantage to be derived" from free exploitation of the discovery. And to permit such a result, whether or not authorized "by express contract," would impermissibly undermine the patent laws.

"Brulotte was brewed in the same barrel," the Court said. Agreements under which patent royalties must be paid after the patent expires "conflict with patent law's policy of establishing a 'post-expiration . . . public domain' in which every person can make free use of a formerly patented product."

Brulotte is no bar to business arrangements to defer payment or create joint enterprises, the Court observed. Nonetheless, "Kimble asks us to abandon Brulotte in favor of 'flexible, case-by-case analysis' of post-expiration royalty clauses 'under the rule of reason,' " as under the antitrust laws. But the antitrust approach requires courts to undertake a complex analysis "taking into account a variety of factors, including specific information about the relevant business, its condition before and after the [practice] was imposed, and the [practice's] history, nature, and effect. . . a full-fledged economic inquiry into the definition of the market, barriers to entry, and the like."

Putting aside for the moment the merits and demerits of taking an antitrust approach to the issue, the court turned to the role of stare decisis, acknowledging that sometimes it "means sticking to some wrong decisions." The reason for that is that usually it is "more important that the applicable rule of law be settled than that it be settled right." Moreover:

Overruling precedent is never a small matter. Stare decisis—in English, the idea that today's Court should stand by yesterday's decisions—is a foundation stone of the rule of law. Application of that doctrine, although not an inexorable command, is the preferred course because it promotes the evenhanded, predictable, and consistent development of legal principles, fosters reliance on judicial decisions, and contributes to the actual and perceived integrity of the judicial process. It also reduces incentives for challenging settled precedents, saving parties and courts the expense of endless relitigation.

Therefore, for the courts to reverse course there must be a "special, justification" over and beyond just a belief that the precedent was wrongly decided. This is especially true for statutes, as in this case: For "critics of our ruling can take their objections across the street, and Congress can correct any mistake it sees." Moreover, in this case, "Congress has spurned multiple opportunities to reverse Brulotte"—50 years or more during which Congress repeatedly amended the patent laws without disturbing Brulotte and it even "rebuffed bills that would have replaced Brulotte 's per se rule with the same antitrust-style analysis Kimble now urges."

The Court then returned to the patent policy issues it had described earlier. They reinforced the reasons for following stare decisis here and not disturbing the Brulotte precedent.

"First, Brulotte's statutory and doctrinal underpinnings have not eroded over time." There was no change in the law, by judicial or congressional action. "[T]he core feature of the patent laws on which Brulotte relied remains just the same. . . .Brulotte, then, is not the kind of doctrinal dinosaur or legal last-man-standing for which we sometimes depart from stare decisis." To the contrary, overruling Brulotte could undermine other case law and thus "unsettle stable law."

Second, contrary to the critics, "nothing about Brulotte has proved unworkable." The ease of determining whether a license call for royalty payments after patent expiration "appears in still sharper relief when compared to Kimble's proposed alternative. Recall that he wants courts to employ antitrust law's rule of reason to identify and invalidate those post-expiration royalty clauses with anti-competitive consequences." That procedure requires an "elaborate inquiry" that "produces notoriously high litigation costs and unpredictable results." For that reason, "trading in Brulotte for the rule of reason would make the law less, not more, workable than it is now."

According to Kimble, the Court states, post-expiration royalties are not anticompetitive; they are procompetitive. They lead to lower royalty rates during the patent term, which leads to lower consumer prices. Also, more companies can afford the cheaper licenses, fostering competition among the licensees. Even assuming that this is true, the Court responded, it misconceives the basis for Brulotte. "If Brulotte were an antitrust rather than a patent case, we might [decide] as Kimble would like." But this is a patent case—a patent misuse case. It rests on patent policy. "Congress had made a judgment: that the day after a patent lapses, the formerly protected invention must be available to all for free." The "choice of what patent policy should be" lies with Congress.

Finally, the Court insisted: "In adhering to our precedent as against such complaints, we promote the rule-of-law values to which courts must attend while leaving matters of public policy to Congress." The Court concluded with a literary flourish, by quoting from Amazing Fantasy #15, the source of one of the most famous themes of Spider-Man—with great power comes great responsibility.

=== Dissent ===
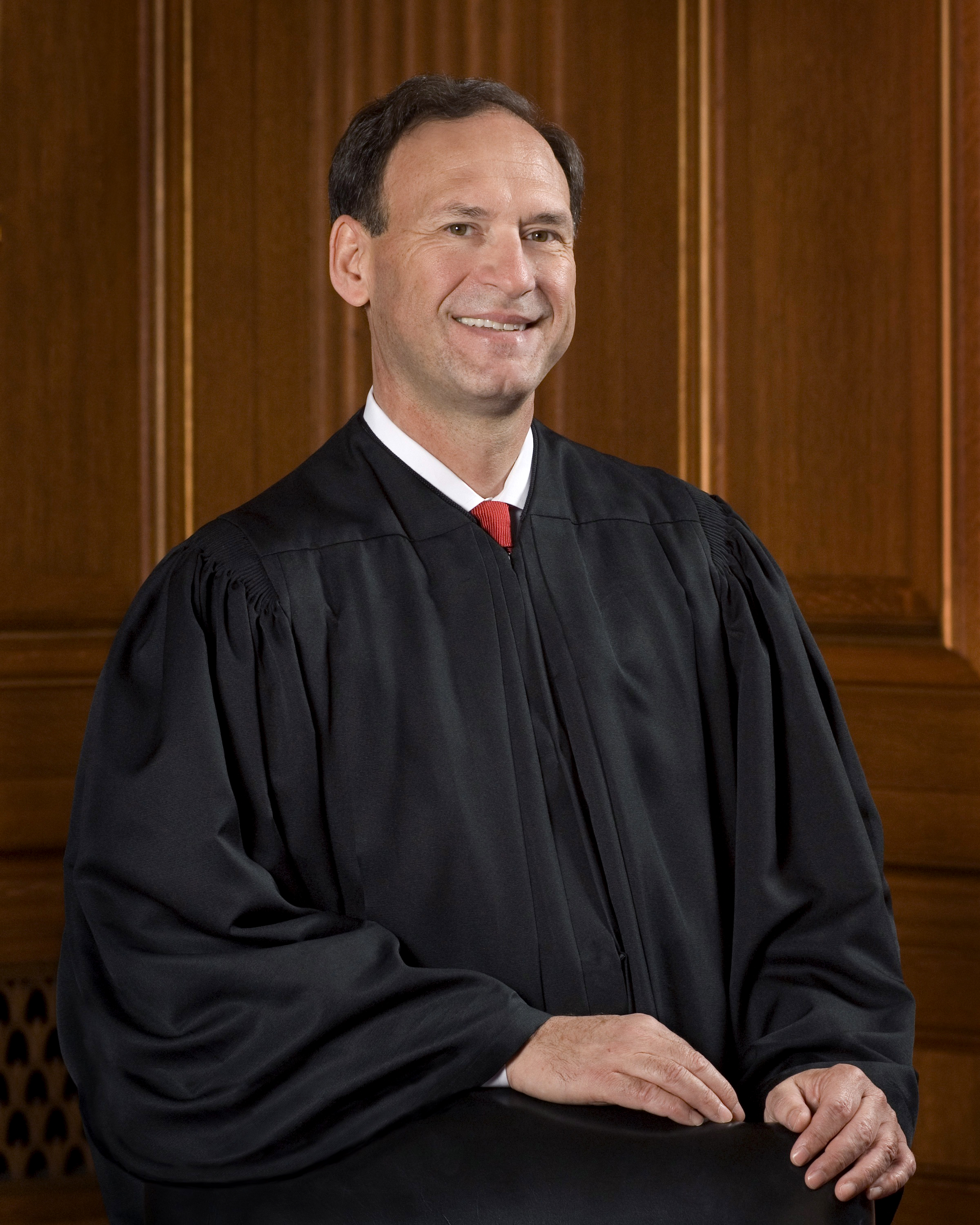
Justice Alito

Speaking for himself and Justices Roberts and Thomas, Justice Samuel Alito dissented, asserting that the Court "employs stare decisis, normally a tool of [judicial] restraint, to reaffirm a clear case of judicial overreach." He insisted that Brulotte:

was not based on anything that can plausibly be regarded as an interpretation of the terms of the Patent Act. It was based instead on an economic theory—and one that has been debunked. The decision interferes with the ability of parties to negotiate licensing agreements that reflect the true value of a patent, and it disrupts contractual expectations. Stare decisis does not require us to retain this baseless and damaging precedent. . . . Brulotte was thus a bald act of policy making. It was not simply a case of incorrect statutory interpretation. It was not really statutory interpretation at all.

He denied that the principle that stare decisis applies particularly to decisions based on statutes was relevant here. "When a precedent is based on a judge-made rule and is not grounded in anything that Congress has enacted, we cannot 'properly place on the shoulders of Congress' the entire burden of correcting 'the Court's own error.' "

Justice Alito also rejected the antitrust-patent misuse distinction that the majority made: "Brulotte was an antitrust decision masquerading as a patent case."

Finally, he disagreed about its being Congress's responsibility rather than the Court's to undo Brulotte:

Passing legislation is no easy task. . . .Within that onerous process, there are additional practical hurdles. A law must be taken up for discussion and not passed over in favor of more pressing matters, and Senate rules require 60 votes to end debate on most legislation. And even if the House and Senate agree on a general policy, the details of the measure usually must be hammered out in a conference committee and repassed by both Houses.

== Commentary ==
- Herbert Hovencamp disagreed with the Court's refusal to interpret patent misuse law through an antitrust lens. He favored widespread use of the antitrust rule of reason to judge the legality (and therefore enforceability) of all commercial transactions in this country. The effect, he said, would be to make arrangements like those in Brulotte "join the general run of agreements that are nearly always legal." He explained:

In other words, using antitrust rather than patent law to address post-expiration royalties would not create nearly the tempest of uncertainty that the Court feared. Nearly all of the situations applying it would simply be lawful. A tiny number of cases involving both market power and plausible anticompetitive exclusion or restraint on trade might be addressable under the antitrust laws. Such an approach would give the parties a better set of tools for managing innovation risk in sensible ways.

- Kevin Noonan in the Patent Docs blog lamented the decision, predicting that it will become "another justification for the legitimate scope of patent rights to be constricted to the point that patents no longer are able to promote progress."
- Neil Wilkof in the IP Kat blog puzzled over the "strange judicial bedfellows" making up the six-justice majority: "the four so-called liberal Justices, Breyer, Ginsburg, Sotomayor and Kagan, joined by arch-conservative Justice Scalia and perennial swing vote Justice Kennedy." The four liberal justices "can be understood as giving expression to the longstanding liberal fear of 'over-extending' IP rights, especially patents, given the anticompetitive effects that in their view lurk in the exercise of patent rights." As for Justice Scalia:

[T]he impetus seems to derive from Justice Scalia's deeply rooted judicial conservatism rather than any concern with the scope of IP rights and their exploitation (or how the Brulotte rule has worked in practice). What is interesting is how he split ranks from the other three so-called conservative justices, Chief Justice Roberts, and Justices Thomas and Alito, who focused on what they viewed as the deeply flawed and anachronistic foundations that undergird the Brulotte decision. Justice Scalia seems to ignore these factors in favour of doctrinal considerations, which brought him to the same result as his liberal colleagues.

- Gene Quinn, in the IP Watchdog, marveled at the role of stare decisis in this case: "If you were going to write a ridiculous piece of fiction that no one in the industry would believe the plot would start with the United States Supreme Court citing stare decisis in a patent case." He compared the approach in Kimble with that in recent patent-eligibility decisions such as Alice v. CLS Bank, which he argued took an opposite view of stare decisis.
- Richard H. Stern, in the European Intellectual Property Review, views Kimble favorably, and sees it as reaffirming a line of previous Supreme Court precedents holding that the misuse doctrine is based on patent policy, not antitrust policy:

The effect of the Kimble decision would seem to be to roll back the line of Federal Circuit decisions culminating in Princo, which had made a showing of substantial anti-competitive effect in the relevant market an essential element of proof in most misuse cases. Kimble reaffirms the doctrine of [those Supreme Court] cases holding that misuse is not antitrust and does not need a showing of actual anticompetitive effect.

He wonders, however, whether determining what is patent policy will prove elusive, and points to areas where courts have differed—in particular, whether all types of misuse should result in unenforceability of the misused patent until the misuse is purged, rather than in just a requirement that the misuse must stop. He therefore predicts further litigation because "the Kimble decision will not make those who think the present US patent misuse doctrine is too harsh creep away and vanish into mouse holes."

== See also ==
- List of United States Supreme Court cases, volume 576
- Patent misuse
