= United States International Trade Commission =

Government agency

International Trade Commission
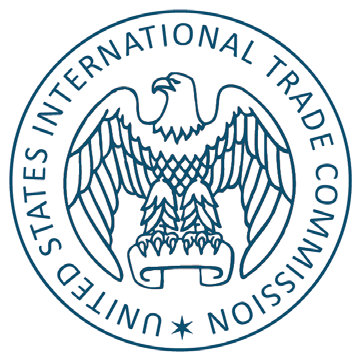

Agency overview
- Formed: September 8, 1916
- Preceding agency: U.S. Tariff Commission
- Jurisdiction: International Trade Issues
- Headquarters: Washington, D.C., U.S.
- Employees: 402 (civilian career employees as of September 30, 2017)
- Agency executive: Brett W. Doyle, Chairman
- Website: www.usitc.gov

The United States International Trade Commission (USITC or ITC) is an agency of the United States federal government that advises the legislative and executive branches on matters of trade. It was created by Congress in 1916 as the U.S. Tariff Commission. It changed to its current name in 1974. It is an independent, bipartisan entity that analyzes trade issues such as tariffs and competitiveness and publishes reports. As a quasi-judicial entity, the USITC investigates the impact of imports on U.S. industries, and directs actions against unfair trade practices, such as subsidies; dumping; and intellectual property infringement, including copyright infringement.

== Background and statutory authority ==
The USITC was established by the U.S. Congress on September 8, 1916, as the U.S. Tariff Commission. In 1974, the name was changed to the U.S. International Trade Commission by section 171 of the Trade Act of 1974. Statutory authority for the USITC's responsibilities is provided by the following legislation:

- Tariff Act of 1930
- Agricultural Adjustment Act of 1933
- Trade Expansion Act of 1962
- Trade Act of 1974
- Trade Agreements Act of 1979
- Trade and Tariff Act of 1984
- Omnibus Trade and Competitiveness Act of 1988
- Uruguay Round Agreements Act of 1994

== Mission ==
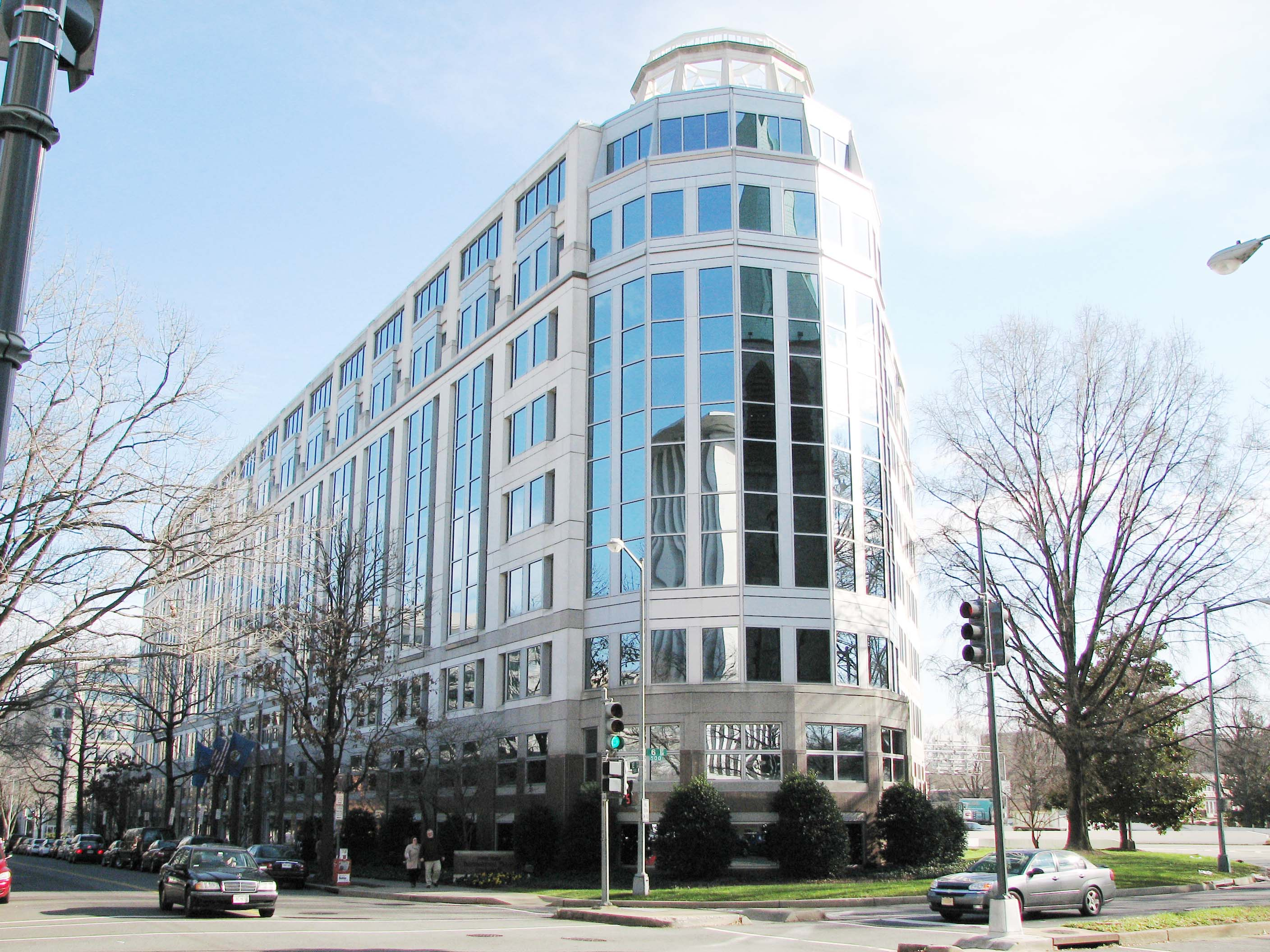
USITC, Washington, DC

The U.S. International Trade Commission seeks to:

1. Administer U.S. trade remedy laws within its mandate in a fair and objective manner;
2. Provide the President, Office of the United States Trade Representative, and Congress with independent, quality analysis, information, and support on matters of tariffs and international trade and competitiveness; and
3. Maintain the Harmonized Tariff Schedule of the United States.

In so doing, the Commission serves the public by implementing U.S. law and contributing to the development and implementation of sound and informed U.S. trade policy.

The USITC's five operations are:

1. Import Injury Investigations
2. Intellectual Property-Based Import Investigations
3. Research Program
4. Trade Information Services
5. Trade Policy Support

== Commissioners ==
The president nominates and the U.S. Senate confirms the six commissioners who make up the USITC. The president and the secretary of state sign the formal commission.

Commissioners' terms are nine years, or, when filling a vacated seat, for the remainder of a term. Their terms are staggered to end 18 months apart. Commissioners may not be reappointed at the start of a new term unless they have served less than five years, although commissioners stay on past the end of their term until their successor is appointed and confirmed. No more than three of the commissioners may be of the same political party.

The chairman's term is for two years, and successive chairmen may not be of the same political party. Only a commissioner with more than one year of service may be designated chairman.

=== Current commissioners ===
The current commissioners as of September 10, 2026:

Position	Name	State	Entered office	Term expires	Party	Originally appointed by
Chairman	Brett W. Doyle	Connecticut	July 17, 2026	December 16, 2030	Republican	Donald Trump
Commissioner	Jason Kearns	Colorado	April 2, 2018	December 16, 2024	Democratic	Donald Trump
Commissioner	Peter-Anthony Pappas	New Jersey	August 3, 2026	June 16, 2035	Republican	Donald Trump
Commissioner	Bartholomew Thanhauser	New York	August 17, 2026	December 16, 2027	Democratic	Donald Trump
Commissioner	David Foley Jr.	Virginia	August 17, 2026	June 16, 2032	Republican	Donald Trump
Commissioner	Samuel Negatu	Washington, D.C.	September 10, 2026	June 16, 2029	Democratic	Donald Trump

== Hearings ==
Although the USITC is not a court, its administrative law judges conduct trial-type official administrative hearings. If a Section 337 Tariff Act complaint has at least three votes from its six Commissioners, an official investigative hearing will be assigned to an administrative law judge. Several dozen new USITC investigations are filed every year. Judicial review is normally exercised by the United States Court of Appeals for the Federal Circuit. After the parties have had the opportunity to conduct fact and expert discovery to develop their respective legal positions, the ALJ (administrative law judge) holds a formal, evidentiary hearing, or trial. There is no jury. About three months after considering the arguments of the parties, the ALJ renders an initial determination (ID). The full ITC reviews and may adopt, modify or reverse the ALJ's initial determination. The ITC's final determination is usually issued about four months after the ALJ's ID. The USITC can impose exclusion orders that keep violating products from entering the United States. Exclusion orders are those which disallow products from entering the United States for sale. While the Administrative Law Judges make determinations, the final decision of relief (i.e. exclusion from import) is made by the President of the United States. Should a party disagree with the decision, appeals may be made to the U.S. Court of Appeals for the Federal Circuit.

== History ==
As part of a large group of legislation passed during the Progressive Era in the early 1900s, U.S. Congress established the United States Tariff Commission in 1916, which had a purpose to apply scientific principles to the study of tariffs and to assist in recommending appropriate tariff levels. Frank Taussig, then an Economics professor at Harvard University, was named the U.S. Tariff Commission's very first chairman. The first offices of the U.S. Tariff Commission were located at 1322 New York Avenue, Washington D.C. Also in 1921, the U.S. Tariff Commission moved to the Old Post Office Building at 7th and E Street NW.

Effective January 1, 1975, the U.S. Tariff Commission was renamed the U.S. International Trade Commission. The USITC had a number of new responsibilities under the Trade Act of 1974, and commission procedures under Section 337 of Tariff Act of 1930 were greatly changed, and Section 337 proceedings brought before Administrative Law Judges had to now conform with the Administrative Procedure Act. Section 337 decisions were also made final, instead of advisory (although subject to presidential disapproval due to policy reasons), and the USITC was also authorized to issue cease and desist orders in addition to exclusion orders.

In 1988, the USITC moved its quarters from the Old Post Office Building to the building it remains in to this day, 500 E Street SW.

Past commissioners of the USITC include:

- Paula Stern (D-TN, sworn in October, 1978, for a term expiring in February 1987)
- Daniel R. Pearson (R–MN; sworn on August 8, 2003, for a term expiring on June 16, 2011)
- Shara L. Aranoff (D–MD; sworn on September 6, 2005, for a term expiring on December 16, 2012)
- Dean A. Pinkert (D–VA; sworn on February 26, 2007, for a term expiring on December 16, 2015)

On January 4, 1985, a USITC decision in favor of Duracell was overturned by President Ronald Reagan. The case involved the import of alkaline batteries in competition with Duracell, the American manufacturer that developed them.

On August 3, 2013, President Barack Obama overturned the commission's decision in investigation No. 337-TA-794 that would have banned Apple Inc. from importing several of its older products.

In January 2015, details from the Sony Pictures Entertainment hack revealed the MPAA's lobbying of the USITC to mandate US Internet service providers either at the internet transit level or consumer level internet service provider, implement IP address blocking against pirate websites as well as linking websites.

In January 2016, it became known that the commission was charged with investigating the likely impact of the TPP on the U.S. economy and specific industries. It will calculate the estimated impact on gross domestic product, exports and imports, employment opportunities, and U.S. consumers.

In January 2018, in a surprise decision, the commission unanimously overturned a 292% trade tariff that had been imposed on the aircraft manufacturer Bombardier Aerospace.

== See also ==
- Agreement on Trade-Related Aspects of Intellectual Property Rights
- Doha Round
- Federal Trade Commission
- Generalized System of Preferences
- International Trade Administration
- Office of the United States Trade Representative
- Title 19 of the Code of Federal Regulations
- United States Commercial Service
- Tariffs in the second Trump administration
