= Dawson Chemical Co. v. Rohm & Haas Co. =

- Supreme Court of the United States

Argued April 21, 1980 Decided June 27, 1980
- Full case name: Dawson Chemical Co. v. Rohm & Haas Co.
- Citations: 448 U.S. 176 (more) 100 S. Ct. 2601; 65 L. Ed. 2d 696; 1980 U.S. LEXIS 7; 206 U.S.P.Q. 385, 1980-2 Trade Cases ¶ 63,494

Case history
- Prior: Rohm & Haas Co. v. Dawson Chem. Co., 1976 U.S. Dist. LEXIS 13707 (S.D. Tex. 1976); 599 F.2d 685 (5th Cir. 1979); cert. granted, 444 U.S. 1012 (1980).
- Subsequent: Rehearing denied, 448 U.S. 917 (1980).

Holding
- The Rohm and Haas Company has not engaged in patent misuse, either by its method of selling propanil or by its refusal to license others to sell that commodity.

Court membership
- Chief Justice Warren E. Burger Associate Justices William J. Brennan Jr. · Potter Stewart; Byron White · Thurgood Marshall; Harry Blackmun · Lewis F. Powell Jr. William Rehnquist · John P. Stevens

Case opinions
- Majority: Blackmun, joined by Burger, Stewart, Powell, Rehnquist
- Dissent: White, joined by Brennan, Marshall, Stevens
- Dissent: Stevens

Laws applied
- 35 U.S.C. § 271(d)

Dawson Chemical Co. v. Rohm & Haas Co., 448 U.S. 176 (1980), is a 1980 5–4 decision of the United States Supreme Court limiting the patent misuse doctrine and explaining the scope of the 1952 amendment of the patent laws that resurrected the contributory infringement doctrine in the wake of the Mercoid cases. The Mercoid cases and a few predecessor cases had denied relief against patent infringement to patentees who were deriving revenue from the sale of unpatented products used as supplies for patented combinations or as components of patented combinations, even when the unpatented products were specially adapted for use with the patented combinations and even when they lacked any utility other than that use. The patentees used contributory infringement suits or threats of such suits to enforce their business model, which the Mercoid cases outlawed.

In the Mercoid cases the Court had stated: "The result of this decision, together with those which have preceded it, is to limit substantially the doctrine of contributory infringement. What residuum may be left we need not stop to consider." This caused "some consternation among patent lawyers," and some "segments of the patent bar eventually decided to ask Congress for corrective legislation that would restore some scope to the contributory infringement doctrine. With great perseverance, they advanced their proposal in three successive Congresses before it eventually was enacted in 1952." Dawson interpreted the 1952 amendments to re-establish contributory infringement as a possible claim for relief and held that supplying an unpatented product especially adapted for use in practicing a patented process and without any substantial non-infringing use was unlawful contributory infringement.

== Background ==
=== Factual setting ===
This case is part of the aftermath of Monsanto Co. v. Rohm & Haas Co., in which Rohm & Haas succeeded in invalidating Monsanto's patent on propanil, a selective herbicide, by showing that Monsanto deceived the Patent Office in procuring the patent. Propanil thus became an unpatented product. With an estimated use of about 8 million pounds in 2001, propanil was one of the more widely used herbicides in the United States.

Although Monsanto had obtained the product patent on propanil on the basis of its selective herbicidal property, Rohm & Haas was able in 1974 to obtain U.S. Patent No. 3,816,092 (the Wilson patent) on a process for applying propanil to inhibit the growth of undesirable plants in areas containing established crops. Claims 1 and 2 are illustrative for purposes of this case:

1. A method for selectively inhibiting growth of undesirable plants in an area containing growing undesirable plants in an established crop, which comprises applying to said area [propanil] at a rate of application which inhibits growth of said undesirable plants and which does not adversely affect the growth of said established crop.
2. The method according to claim 1 wherein the [propanil] is applied in a composition comprising [propanil] and an inert dilutent therefor at a rate of between 0.5 and 6 pounds of [propanil] per acre.

The claims describe the only substantial use for propanil.

Rohm & Haas exploits the process patent by manufacturing propanil and selling it to farmers. Rohm & Haas does not license the patent to the farmers but they acquire an implied license to practice the process by operation of law when they buy propanil from Rohm & Haas, the owner of the process patent. Rohm & Haas does not license the patent to other manufacturers of agricultural chemicals, such as Dawson, which had been making and selling propanil for herbicidal use before Rohm & Haas received its patent. Dawson did not stop engaging in this business after the patent issued, and it sold propanil in packages labeled with instructions to use it as described in the patent. Accordingly, Rohm & Haas sued Dawson for contributory infringement and active inducement of infringement under 35 U.S.C. § 271(c)–(d). Dawson then requested a patent license but Rohm & Haas refused.

=== Proceedings in district court ===
When Rohm & Haas refused to grant it a license, Dawson raised a defense of patent misuse and counterclaimed for alleged antitrust violations. The parties stipulated the facts and Dawson moved for summary judgment of patent misuse, on the grounds that Rohm & Haas misused its patent by allowing the use of the patented method only to purchasers of its own propanil. The district court agreed and dismissed the complaint. In concluding that patent misuse occurred the district court stressed several points. First, Rohm & Haas refused to grant licenses when requested, which Mercoid had offered to do in the Mercoid cases. Therefore, Rohm & Haas "by seeking to monopolize the sale of an unpatented component of its protected method without even attempting to license other manufacturers, is exploiting its patent in a manner which is less legitimate than the exploitation condemned by the Supreme Court in Mercoid." Further, the court pointed to the court of appeals opinion in B.B. Chemical Co. v. Ellis, in which the misuse was based on the patentee's selling "unpatented component products specially made for use in a patented process for reinforcing shoe insoles; [and] the component had no other substantial commercial use." Finally, the facts of Mercoid involved a non-staple switch specially designed for use to practice the patent. The court concluded that the enactment of § 271(d) was intended to overrule the dicta in Mercoid against there being any residuum of contributory infringement but was not intended to overturn the ruling as to the specific facts, which the court considered equivalent to those of the case before it.

=== Ruling of Fifth Circuit ===
Rohm & Haas appealed to the Fifth Circuit, which reversed. It concluded that § 271(d) was intended to "provide for a patentee's right to exclude others and reserve to itself, if it chooses, the right to sell nonstaples used substantially only in its invention."

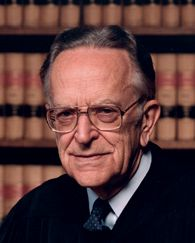
Justice Harry A. Blackmun

== Ruling of Supreme Court ==
Justice Harry Blackmun delivered the opinion of a 5-4 Court in which Chief Justice Warren Burger and Justices Potter Stewart, Lewis Powell, and William Rehnquist joined. Justice Byron R. White filed a dissenting opinion in which Justices William J. Brennan, Thurgood Marshall, and John Paul Stevens joined. Justice Stevens also filed a separate dissent.

=== Majority opinion ===
==== Importance of case ====
Justice Blackmun began by describing the case and its importance:

[This case] presents an important question of statutory interpretation arising under the patent laws. The issue before us is whether the owner of a patent on a chemical process is guilty of patent misuse, and therefore is barred from seeking relief against contributory infringement of its patent rights, if it exploits the patent only in conjunction with the sale of an unpatented article that constitutes a material part of the invention and is not suited for commercial use outside the scope of the patent claims.

The answer will determine whether respondent, the owner of a process patent on a chemical herbicide, may maintain an action for contributory infringement against other manufacturers of the chemical used in the process.

To resolve this issue, we must construe the various provisions of 35 U.S.C. § 271, which Congress enacted in 1952 to codify certain aspects of the doctrines of contributory infringement and patent misuse that previously had been developed by the judiciary.

==== Contributory infringement versus patent misuse ====
The Court traced the doctrines of contributory infringement and patent misuse back respectively to Wallace v. Holmes, and Motion Picture Patents Co. v. Universal Film Mfg. Co. "Both doctrines originally were developed by the courts" and "both concern the relationship between a patented invention and unpatented articles or elements that are needed for the invention to be practiced." But since 1952 when Congress enacted 35 U.S.C. § 271, they are governed by statute rather than judge-made rules.

"Of particular import to the present controversy are subsections (c) and (d). The former defines conduct that constitutes contributory infringement; the latter specifies conduct of the patentee that is not to be deemed misuse." They provide:

(c) Whoever sells a component of a patented machine, manufacture, combination or composition, or a material or apparatus for use in practicing a patented process, constituting a material part of the invention, knowing the same to be especially made or especially adapted for use in an infringement of such patent, and not a staple article or commodity of commerce suitable for substantial noninfringing use, shall be liable as a contributory infringer. (d) No patent owner otherwise entitled to relief for infringement or contributory infringement of a patent shall be denied relief or deemed guilty of misuse or illegal extension of the patent right by reason of his having done one or more of the following: (1) derived revenue from acts which if performed by another without his consent would constitute contributory infringement of the patent; (2) licensed or authorized another to perform acts which if performed without his consent would constitute contributory infringement of the patent; (3) sought to enforce his patent rights against infringement or contributory infringement.

The Court explained the reason for the doctrine of contributory infringement:

It exists to protect patent rights from subversion by those who, without directly infringing the patent themselves, engage in acts designed to facilitate infringement by others. This protection is of particular importance in situations . . . where enforcement against direct infringers would be difficult, and where the technicalities of patent law make it relatively easy to profit from another's invention without risking a charge of direct infringement.

But the doctrine has encountered difficulties because of "concern for potential anticompetitive tendencies inherent in actions for contributory infringement." Thus, the "judicial history of contributory infringement thus may be said to be marked by a period of ascendancy, in which the doctrine was expanded to the point where it became subject to abuse, followed by a somewhat longer period of decline, in which the concept of patent misuse was developed as an increasingly stringent antidote to the perceived excesses of the earlier period."

An example of ascendency was the decision in Leeds & Catlin Co. v. Victor Talking Machine Co., in which the Court upheld an injunction against contributory infringement by a manufacturer of phonograph discs specially designed for use in a patented disc-and-stylus phonograph-player combination. Although the disc itself was not patented, the Court noted that it was essential to the functioning of the patented combination, and that its method of interaction with the stylus was what "mark[ed] the advance upon the prior art." Also, the disc was useful only when used with the stylus of the patent. The contributory infringement doctrine then "achieved its high-water mark with the decision in Henry v. A.B. Dick Co. In that case, a divided Court extended contributory infringement principles to permit a post-sale restriction by which a manufacturer of a patented mimeograph machine required purchasers to buy from the patentee all supplies used in connection with the patented machine (for example, such staple items as paper and ink). The Court reasoned that the market for these supplies was created by the invention, and that sale of a license to use them could be therefore properly be limited by whatever conditions the patent owner wished to impose. The A.B. Dick decision and its progeny in the lower courts led to a vast expansion in tie-in conditions in the licensing of patented goods and processes, and control of markets for staple and nonstaple goods alike.

This led to "an inevitable judicial reaction" and the overruling of the A.B. Dick case. In Motion Picture Patents Co. v. Universal Film Mfg. Co., the Court "signalled a new trend that was to continue for years thereafter." In that case, the owner of a patent on film projection equipment attempted to prevent competitors from selling film for use in the patented equipment by attaching to the projectors it sold a notice purporting to condition use of the machine on exclusive use of its unpatented film. Relying upon the rule that the scope of a patent "must be limited to the invention described in the claims,Motion Picture Patents, the Court held that the attempted restriction on use of unpatented supplies was improper because it expanded the patent monopoly beyond the scope of the claims and the patent law.

A series of cases followed in which the Court condemned various tie-ins. In Carbice Corp. v. American Patents Dev. Corp., the Court denied relief to a patentee that tied use of a patented shipping package to the purchase of unpatented, staple dry ice. Leitch Manufacturing Co. v. Barber Co., found patent misuse in an attempt to exploit a process patent for the curing of cement through tying to the use of the process the purchase of bituminous emulsion, an unpatented staple article of commerce used in the process. The Leitch Court refused to limit the rule of Carbice and Motion Picture Patents to cases involving explicit tie-in agreements extending the patent monopoly, and it stated the broad proposition that "every use of a patent as a means of obtaining a limited monopoly of unpatented material is prohibited."Leitch, Morton Salt Co. v. G.S. Suppiger Co., involved an attempt by tie-in to control the market for salt tablets used in a patented dispenser; the Court explicitly linked the doctrine of patent misuse to the "unclean hands" doctrine traditionally applied by courts of equity. Its companion case, B.B. Chemical Co. v. Ellis, held that patent misuse barred relief even where infringement had been actively induced, and that practical difficulties in profitably marketing a patented invention could not justify patent misuse.

None of the Court's decisions up to this point had explicitly addressed how the doctrines of contributory infringement and patent misuse applied in the case of a tie-in restriction on a nonstaple article capable of use only for infringing a patent. "[S]ome courts and commentators apparently took the view that control of nonstaple items capable only of infringing use might not bar patent protection against contributory infringement. This view soon received a serious, if not fatal, blow from the Court's controversial decisions" in The Mercoid Cases. In these cases, "the Court definitely held that any attempt to control the market for unpatented goods would constitute patent misuse, even if those goods had no use outside a patented invention."

==== Court's analysis of the Mercoid cases ====
Both Mercoid cases involved a single patent that claimed a combination of elements for a furnace heating system. Mid-Continent was the owner of the patent, and Honeywell was its only licensee. Although neither company made or installed the furnace system, Honeywell manufactured and sold stoker switches especially made for and essential to the system's operation, and the switches had no other substantial use. The right to build and use the patented furnace system was granted to purchasers of the stoker switches, and royalties owed the patentee were calculated on the number of stoker switches sold. Mercoid manufactured and marketed a competing stoker switch that was designed to be used only in the patented combination. Mercoid had been offered a sublicense but had refused to take one. Mid-Continent and Honeywell separately sued Mercoid for contributory infringement and it raised tie-in patent misuse as a defense.

In Mercoid I, the Court held the licensing arrangement to be an unlawful attempt to extend the patent monopoly. The Dawson Court said that the Mercoid I opinion "painted with a very broad brush." Prior patent misuse decisions had involved attempts "to secure a partial monopoly in supplies consumed . . . or unpatented materials employed" in connection with the practice of the invention. None of them, however, had involved an integral component necessary to the functioning of the patented system. Yet, the Mercoid Court refused to infer any "difference in principle" from this distinction in the facts. Instead, it stated an expansive legal rule that apparently admitted no exception:

The necessities or convenience of the patentee do not justify any use of the monopoly of the patent to create another monopoly. The fact that the patentee has the power to refuse a license does not enable him to enlarge the monopoly of the patent by the expedient of attaching conditions to its use. . . . The method by which the monopoly is sought to be extended is immaterial. . . . When the patentee ties something else to his invention, he acts only by virtue of his right as the owner of property to make contracts concerning it, and not otherwise. He then is subject to all the limitations upon that right which the general law imposes upon such contracts. The contract is not saved by anything in the patent laws because it relates to the invention. If it were, the mere act of the patentee could make the distinctive claim of the patent attach to something which does not possess the quality of invention. Then the patent would be diverted from its statutory purpose and become a ready instrument for economic control in domains where the anti-trust acts or other laws, not the patent statutes, define the public policy.

The Mercoid Court "recognized that its reasoning directly conflicted with Leeds & Catlin Co. v. Victor Talking Machine Co." and it "registered disapproval, if not outright rejection, of that case." It also recognized that "[t]he result of this decision, together with those which have preceded it, is to limit substantially the doctrine of contributory infringement." Then the Mercoid "Court commented, rather cryptically, that it would not 'stop to consider' what 'residuum' of the contributory infringement doctrine 'may be left.'"

As for Mercoid II the Dawson Court said that it "did not add much to the breathtaking sweep of its companion decision," but it nonetheless commented: "However worthy it may be, however essential to the patent, an unpatented part of a combination patent is no more entitled to monopolistic protection than any other unpatented device."

==== Court's conclusions about caselaw ====
The Court drew two principal conclusions from its review of the case law up to the Mercoid cases. It saw "a fairly complicated picture in which the rights and obligations of patentees as against contributory infringers have varied over time." It drew these inferences pertinent to the case before it:

First, we agree with the Court of Appeals that the concepts of contributory infringement and patent misuse "rest on antithetical underpinnings." . . . And an inevitable concomitant of the right to enjoin another from contributory infringement is the capacity to suppress competition in an unpatented article of commerce. Proponents of contributory infringement defend this result on the grounds that it is necessary for the protection of the patent right, and that the market for the unpatented article flows from the patentee's invention. . . . Yet suppression of competition in unpatented goods is precisely what the opponents of patent misuse decry. If both the patent misuse and contributory infringement doctrines are to coexist, then each must have some separate sphere of operation with which the other does not interfere. Second, we find that the majority of cases in which the patent misuse doctrine was developed involved undoing the damage thought to have been done by A.B. Dick. The desire to extend patent protection to control of staple articles of commerce died slowly, and the ghost of the expansive contributory infringement era continued to haunt the courts. As a result, among the historical precedents in this Court, only the Leeds & Catlin and Mercoid cases bear significant factual similarity to the present controversy. Those cases involved questions of control over unpatented articles that were essential to the patented inventions, and that were unsuited for any commercial noninfringing use. In this case, we face similar questions in connection with a chemical propanil, the herbicidal properties of which are essential to the advance on prior art disclosed by respondent's patented process. Like the record disc in Leeds & Catlin or the stoker switch in the Mercoid cases, and unlike the dry ice in Carbice or the bituminous emulsion in Leitch, propanil is a nonstaple commodity which has no use except through practice of the patented method. Accordingly, had the present case arisen prior to Mercoid, we believe it fair to say that it would have fallen close to the wavering line between legitimate protection against contributory infringement and illegitimate patent misuse.

==== How § 271 affected Mercoid ====
"The Mercoid decisions left in their wake some consternation among patent lawyers [Footnote 15] and a degree of confusion in the lower courts. As a result: "Certain segments of the patent bar eventually decided to ask Congress for corrective legislation that would restore some scope to the contributory infringement doctrine. With great perseverance, they advanced their proposal in three successive Congresses before it eventually was enacted in 1952 as 35 U.S.C. § 271."

The majority agreed with Rohm & Hass that "§ 271(d) immunizes its conduct from the charge of patent misuse," and therefore "it should not be barred from seeking relief." In summary:

The approach that Congress took toward the codification of contributory infringement and patent misuse reveals a compromise between those two doctrines and their competing policies that permits patentees to exercise control over non-staple articles used in their inventions. Section 271(c) identifies the basic dividing line between contributory infringement and patent misuse. It adopts a restrictive definition of contributory infringement that distinguishes between staple and nonstaple articles of commerce... As a result, it is no longer necessary to resort to the doctrine of patent misuse in order to deny patentees control over staple goods used in their inventions.

Also, § 271(d) rolled back Mercoid 's expansion of misuse to nonstaples:

In our view, the provisions of § 271(d) effectively confer upon the patentee, as a lawful adjunct of his patent rights, a limited power to exclude others from competition in nonstaple goods. A patentee may sell a nonstaple article himself while enjoining others from marketing that same good without his authorization. By doing so, he is able to eliminate competitors, and thereby to control the market for that product. Moreover, his power to demand royalties from others for the privilege of selling the nonstaple item itself implies that the patentee may control the market for the nonstaple good; otherwise, his "right" to sell licenses for the marketing of the nonstaple good would be meaningless, since no one would be willing to pay him for a superfluous authorization. 271(d) effectively confer upon the patentee, as a lawful adjunct of his patent rights, a limited power to exclude others from competition in nonstaple goods. A patentee may sell a nonstaple article himself while enjoining others from marketing that same good without his authorization. By doing so, he is able to eliminate competitors, and thereby to control the market for that product. Moreover, his power to demand royalties from others for the privilege of selling the nonstaple item itself implies that the patentee may control the market for the nonstaple good; otherwise, his "right" to sell licenses for the marketing of the nonstaple good would be meaningless, since no one would be willing to pay him for a superfluous authorization.

Since all of what Rohm & Hass did here is immunized under § 271(d), it is entitled to prevail against Dawson in its contributory infringement suit.

The majority found that the legislative history confirmed its view. Even though Senator McCarran, a spokesman for the legislation, commented on the floor of the Senate that the Act just "codif[ies] the patent laws," he also submitted a statement "which explained that, although the general purpose of the Act was to clarify existing law, it also included several changes taken '[i]n view of decisions of the Supreme Court and others.' " The legislative reports also said that § 271 was intended "to codify in statutory form the principles of contributory infringement and, at the same time, [to] eliminate... doubt and confusion" that had resulted from "decisions of the courts in recent years."

In addition, there was testimony in the 1948 hearings on the legislation from the "New York Patent Law Association, which had supervised drafting of the legislation... that candidly declared that the purpose of the proposal was to reverse the trend of Supreme Court decisions that indirectly had cut back on the contributory infringement doctrine." This group "criticized several decisions, including Leitch and Carbice as well as the two Mercoids... [and] went on to explain that the proposed legislation was designed to counteract this effect by providing that... enforcement of the right to be protected against contributory infringement... shall not be regarded as misuse of the patent." Giles Rich, then a prominent New York patent lawyer, testified that the proper distinction was that between the Carbice and Mercoid cases, stressing the staple-nonstaple distinction between dry ice and the special stoker switch without any noninfringing use was critical. Because proposed § 271 "incorporated a staple-nonstaple distinction in the definition of contributory infringement," Rich argued, the bill would "correct [the] situation left by Mercoid without giving sanction to practices such as those in the Carbice case."

Rich spoke out similarly in the 1949 hearings, the majority noted. "To restore the doctrine of contributory infringement where it was most needed, Rich argued, it was essential to restrict pro tanto the judicially created doctrine of patent misuse":

[W]e are dealing with a problem which involves a conflict between two doctrines, contributory infringement and misuse... [T]he only way you can make contributory infringement operative again as a doctrine is to make some exceptions to the misuse doctrine and say that certain acts shall not be misuse... Contributory infringement has been destroyed by the misuse doctrine...

The majority opinion summarized the meaning of § 271(d) as disclosed by the hearings as follows:

It is the consistent theme of the legislative history that the statute was designed to accomplish a good deal more than mere clarification. It significantly changed existing law, and the change moved in the direction of expanding the statutory protection enjoyed by patentees. The responsible congressional Committees were told again and again that contributory infringement would wither away if the misuse rationale of the Mercoid decisions remained as a barrier to enforcement of the patentee's rights. They were told that this was an undesirable result that would deprive many patent holders of effective protection for their patent rights. They were told that Congress could strike a sensible compromise between the competing doctrines of contributory infringement and patent misuse if it eliminated the result of the Mercoid decisions, yet preserved the result in Carbice. And they were told that the proposed legislation would achieve this effect by restricting contributory infringement to the sphere of nonstaple goods, while exempting the control of such goods from the scope of patent misuse. These signals cannot be ignored. They fully support the conclusion that, by enacting §§ 271(c) and (d), Congress granted to patent holders a statutory right to control nonstaple goods that are capable only of infringing use in a patented invention, and that are essential to that invention's advance over prior art.

==== Post-1952 Supreme Court decisions ====
Dawson argued that post-1952 decisions of the Supreme Court such as the two Aro decisions, continued to follow Mercoid and rejected the majority's interpretation of § 271(d). In Aro Mfg. Co. v. Convertible Top Replacement Co. (Aro I), the Court had considered whether Aro's supplying to GM car owners a piece of common fabric cut to fit the contours of a patented convertible top combination, where the owners wanted to replace a worn top, was contributory infringement. Because contributory infringement cannot exist without underlying direct infringement, and the car owners had a right to keep their cars in good repair, there was no direct infringement and thus no contributory infringement. In so ruling, the Aro Court had quoted passages in Mercoid that said no part of a patented combination, such as the unpatented fabric top of the convertible top combination. was essential or the heart or gist of the invention and therefore separately protectable. The Dawson majority said this ruling was not inconsistent with its interpretation of § 271(d). In Aro Mfg. Co. v. Convertible Top Replacement Co. (Aro II), the same controversy turned to Ford cars that used the convertible top invention but had not been licensed. This time the Aro II majority held that repairing unlicensed cars by supplying new fabric tops was contributory infringement under § 271(c). That, too, the Dawson majority said, was consistent with its interpretation of § 271. Moreover, the Court said, the Aro II majority rejected attempted reliance on Mercoid because "§ 271 was enacted for the express purpose . . . of overruling any blanket invalidation of the [contributory infringement] doctrine that could be found in the Mercoid opinions." Finally, the Court said, the Aro cases involved repair versus reconstruction, for which the staple-nonstaple distinction is not relevant, the case at bar involved "the primary-use market for a chemical process," in which the staple-nonstaple distinction "supplies the controlling benchmark."

=== Dissenting opinion by Justice White ===
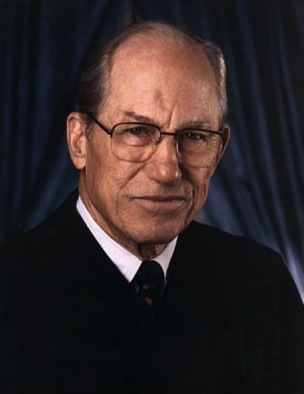
Justice Byron White

Writing for a four-justice minority, Justice White strongly criticized the majority because it "recognizes, as it must, that § 271 does not, on its face, exempt the broad category of nonstaple materials from the misuse doctrine, yet construes it to do so based on what it has gleaned from the testimony of private patent lawyers given in hearings before congressional Committees and from the testimony of Department of Justice attorneys opposing the bill." Despite the fact that nothing in support of the Court's construction could be "found in the Committee Reports or in the statements of those Congressmen or Senators sponsoring the bill," he added, the majority chose to rely "only on the opposing positions of nonlegislators . . . to extend the patent monopoly beyond preexisting standards."

White reviewed the prior patent misuse cases from Motion Picture Patents to Mercoid and found they uniformly prohibited "every use of a patent as a means of obtaining a limited monopoly of unpatented material," and did so regardless of "the nature of the device by which the owner of a patent seeks to effect such unauthorized extension of the monopoly." He pointed out that the lower courts in the B.B. Chemical case "had rejected the patent owner's attempt to distinguish previous patent misuse cases as involving efforts to control the use of staple materials with substantial noninfringing uses." The Supreme Court then unanimously affirmed them, which White said "necessarily reject[ed]ing petitioner's position that patent misuse was limited to staple products, and did not apply when the alleged infringer went beyond selling an unpatented staple material and manufactured and sold materials useful only in the patented construct."

According to White, the line of cases since Motion Picture Patents "established, even before this Court's decisions in the Mercoid cases, . . . that the patent misuse doctrine would bar recovery by a patent holder who refused to license others to use a patented process unless they purchased from him an unpatented product for use in the process." He argued that Rohm & Haas's "conduct in this clearly constitutes patent misuse under these pre-Mercoid decisions because [it] refuses to license others to use its patented process unless they purchase from it unpatented propanil." He dismissed as irrelevant the fact that propanil was a non-staple. Indeed, the fact that propanil lacked non-infringing use further made the conduct misuse:

Moreover, the fact that propanil is a nonstaple product having no substantial use except in the patented process has been without significance at least since B.B. Chemical, and only serves to reinforce the conclusion that respondent is attempting to extend the patent monopoly to unpatented materials. Because propanil has no substantial noninfringing use, it cannot be sold without incurring liability for contributory infringement unless the vendor has a license to sell propanil or its vendee has an unconditional license to use the patented process. Respondent's refusal to license those who do not purchase propanil from it thus effectively subjects all competing sellers of propanil to liability for contributory infringement.

Section 271(d) should not be interpreted to immunize this conduct without a clear signal from Congress that it desires that result, he said, and that signal is lacking. 271(d) "does not state that respondent may exclude all competitors from the propanil market by refusing to license all those who do not purchase propanil from it. This is the very conduct that constitutes patent misuse under the traditional doctrine."

He turned to the opinion of the court of appeals, which chose to give Rohm & Haas a monopoly over unpatented propanil because "the rights to license another to sell [nonstaple] unpatented items would be rendered worthless if the only right conferred by (d)(1) were the right to sell the item as one competitor among many freely competing." That was wrong for two reasons. First, Rohm & Haas could collect royalties from its licensed competitors, who would need licenses to avoid contributory infringement liability. Second, "it also is fundamentally inconsistent with the congressional policy 'to preserve and foster competition' in the sale of unpatented materials, a policy that, as we have recognized, survived enactment of § 271."

The majority "acknowledges that respondent refused to license others to sell propanil, but it observes that 'nothing on the face of the statute requires it to do so.' " White says that is so, but that does not "absolve" Rohm & Haas from misuse: "Section 271(d) does not define conduct that constitutes patent misuse; rather, it simply outlines certain conduct that is not patent misuse. Because the terms of the statute are terms of exception, the absence of any express mention of a licensing requirement does not indicate that respondent's refusal to license others is protected by § 271(d). This much seems elementary." The legislative history indicates only an intention by Congress "of reinstating the doctrine of contributory infringement as it had been developed by decisions prior to Mercoid, and of overruling any blanket invalidation of the doctrine that could be found in the Mercoid opinions." The majority can find nothing in the debates or Committee Reports to support its position, or anything said by legislators, so it turns to "the opinions of private patent attorneys as to the meaning of the proposed legislation." White then says it is contrary to precedent to do that. Moreover, not even the patent attorneys went as far as the majority in overturning misuse law. The patent attorneys only argued that knowingly selling a non-staple specially adapted for infringement should be made unlawful, as it was in § 271(c). That testimony does "not support the Court's broad holding that Congress intended to give patent holders complete control over nonstaple materials that otherwise would be in the public domain." The majority, White protested, was extending contributory infringement "far beyond what the Committees were told § 271(d) would effect. Indeed, the representations were that, aside from the exemptions spelled out in § 271(d), a patentee's control of nonstaples would be subject to the doctrine of patent misuse."

=== Dissent by Justice Stevens ===
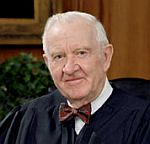
Justice John Paul Stevens

Justice Stevens joined in the White dissent but added further remarks to criticize the majority's approach. He called Rohm & Haas's conduct "a classic case of patent misuse" that "nothing in 35 U.S.C. § 271(d) excludes . . . from the well-established misuse doctrine." He observed that the majority was led into reaching its result by the fact that it would not have been "profitable to exploit this patent by granting express licenses for fixed terms to users of propanil or by granting licenses to competing sellers." and that the patent would have little value "unless the patentee is permitted to engage in patent misuse." That was not a sound basis for the majority's decision: "For the logic of the Court's holding would seem to justify the extension of the patent monopoly to unpatented nonstaples even in cases in which the patent could be profitably exploited without misuse."

== Commentary ==
=== Hodgeman ===
Roger Hodgeman sees the problems encountered in Dawson Chemical as "engendered by conflict between lawmaking authorities." Law occurs in legislation and in judicial opinions dealing with the subject matter of the legislation. " Ideally, these two sources of law should not be at odds with each other and should reflect the same policies on subject matter governed by federal law." But in the case of §§ 271(c) and (d) that did not happen, largely because the legislative history was ambiguous.

The issue presented in Dawson Chemical was "whether Rohm & Haas' method of selling unpatented propanil, coupled with a refusal to license competitors to sell that item, constituted patent misuse," and therefore "that Rohm & Haas should have been required to grant express licenses to competing producers of propanil before it could claim and recover for contributory infringement. Both parties and the majority and dissent made strong arguments for their respective positions. Hodgeman maintains that the majority correctly rejected the proposal to impose compulsory licensing:

If the Court had required that Rohm & Haas grant licenses to its competitors before suing for infringement under section 271(c), especially in light of the differing interpretations of pre-Mercoid case law, then the Court necessarily would have engaged in a great deal of judicial legislation reaching far into uncharted waters that cannot be reached by interpretation of existing law. Without a clear signal from Congress and with no clear reconciliation of the pre-Mercoid contributory infringement and patent misuse decisions, the Court was wise not to read any additional requirement into section 271.

He sees the result of the decision "not as inherently unjustifiable as the dissent suggests." To be sure, Rohm & Haas may choose to monopolize the sale of all propanil in the United States for the life of the patent, but propanil is not in widespread noninfringing use—it has no noninfringing use. Unless someone discovers another use, the monopoly and commercial value will coincide with the patented invention. Before the invention, propanil was worthless nec it had no commercial use. On the other hand, Hodgeman says the compromise made here may give Rohm & Haas too long an exclusive right:

Congress might consider enacting legislation that would limit a patent owner's right to sue contributory infringers to a period of seven years, when the patent owner (1) sells the patented invention's material, nonpatented, nonstaple component, which has no substantial noninfringing use, and at the same time (2) expressly refuses to license any competitors to sell the component.

=== Kobak ===
James Kobak observes, "Watershed event though it was, the Rohm and Haas case does not appear to have led to many changes in patent licensing practices or to extensive practical reliance on Sections 271(c) and (d)." He attributes this to the risks of a misstep, which "have clearly counseled caution and conservatism in interpreting five to four Supreme Court decisions," and the fact that "fundamentally, a licensor could not at the time of licensing necessarily know with assurance whether an item would be held to be a non-staple – or whether it would remain that way for the life of the patent."

The 1988 passage of § 271(d), however, may have significantly changed things by establishing that "a patentee may explicitly tie in either a license or sale transaction without being found guilty of misuse as long as its patent does not confer 'market power.' " Moreover, patentees are free to do this irrespective of "whether what is tied is ultimately determined to be a staple or non-staple." Accordingly, "if the patentee is confident that a non-staple is involved," then it can "also license (but not sell) under Section 271(d)(3) with a tie-in condition even if it fears that the patent may be found to confer market power."

=== Sherry ===
Stephen Sherry argues that the majority should have "balanced the policy objectives embodied in the contributory infringement and patent misuse doctrines" against one another rather than expanding patent monopoly privileges. He states, "A balanced approach to the decision would have protected the patentee's privilege to derive economic benefit from the patent by permitting the use of tying arrangements" while preserving competition among suppliers of nonstaples and not imposing extra costs on consumers.

Since Congress had not spoken one way or the other about tying nonstaples, Sherry argues, the Court should have looked to the patent law policy that disfavors contributory infringement, to the misuse policy disfavoring tie-ins, and considered each. Had it done so, "it might have opted for a more cautious and reasonable resolution to the Dawson conflict." Sherry maintains:

A tying scheme can enhance the economic reward received by a patent owner making the legal monopoly more profitable to the inventor. Increasing the remunerative aspects of the patent monopoly promotes the policy objectives of the patent law. Conversely, requiring the patent owner to license competitors that supply the tied product fosters competition favored by the antitrust laws. Permitting the use of a tying arrangement only when competition in the unpatented nonstaple component is maintained represents a balanced approach toward resolving the policy conflict present in Dawson.

Sherry insists that "Congress did not intend section 271(d) to endorse or reject tying arrangements per se." Rather, "Congress was apparently trying to modify the [Mercoid] Court's view that some conduct was patent misuse per se irrespective of the actual effect it might have had on competition." Therefore, the Dawson Court should have effectuated this compromise to realize that "the logical result would have been to permit the use of tying arrangements only under circumstances where competition in the market supplying the nonstaple component would not be eliminated." The Court should not have ignored the testimony by some proponents of the amendment who "characterized section 271(d) as a remedial measure aimed at protecting those patent owners, like the one in Mercoid, who were willing to license others to supply the unpatented nonstaple components of the invention."

=== Morris ===
Ann Morris finds the majority's interpretation of §§ 271(c) and (d) correct – "The statutory language seems capable of no other interpretation." She finds the Dawson Court's position "consistent with its recent willingness to allow flexibility in matters concerning protection for intellectual property," as shown in such then recent pro-IP cases as Diamond v. Chakrabarty, Aronson v. Quick Point Pencil Co., Zacchini v. Scripps-Howard Broadcasting Co., Kewanee Oil v. Bicron Corp., and Goldstein v. California,

Morris insists:

A patentee of a combination or process [should] retain the rights of his patent monopoly, without relinquishing any of the control inherent in the right, even though part of his complex invention is not patentable. The Court has seen that in today's industrial world, a nonstaple item (as defined by section 271(c)) should not dictate any narrowing of the patent privilege, for by definition it is used solely with the patented invention. More importantly, infringers of the patent should not be permitted to rely on thequirks of patentability to escape liability for their acts.
