= Mercoid cases =

The Mercoid cases—Mercoid Corp. v. Mid-Continent Investment Co., 320 U.S. 661 (1944), and Mercoid Corp. v. Minneapolis-Honeywell Regulator Co., 320 U.S. 680 (1944)—are 1944 patent tie-in misuse and antitrust decisions of the United States Supreme Court. These companion cases are said to have reached the "high-water mark of the patent misuse doctrine." The Court substantially limited the contributory infringement doctrine by holding unlawful tie-ins of "non-staple" unpatented articles that were specially adapted only for use in practicing a patent, and the Court observed: "The result of this decision, together with those which have preceded it, is to limit substantially the doctrine of contributory infringement. What residuum may be left we need not stop to consider." The Court also suggested that an attempt to extend the reach of a patent beyond its claims could or would violate the antitrust laws: "The legality of any attempt to bring unpatented goods within the protection of the patent is measured by the antitrust laws, not by the patent law."

In response to the Mercoid cases, the patent bar eventually persuaded Congress to limit the sweep of these rulings by enacting sections 271(c) and (d) of the patent code in 1952. Those provisions rolled back to some extent the law on contributory infringement and tie-ins. Subsection (c) defined unlawful contributory infringement as the knowing sale of a non-staple product that is a material part of the invention and is specially adapted for the infringement of the patent—essentially, products without any use except infringement. Subsection (d) made it not misuse or illegal extension of patent rights for a patentee to derive revenue from what would be contributory infringement. The Supreme Court in 1980 characterized this legislation limiting Mercoid as a compromise between the doctrines of misuse and contributory infringement.

== Background ==
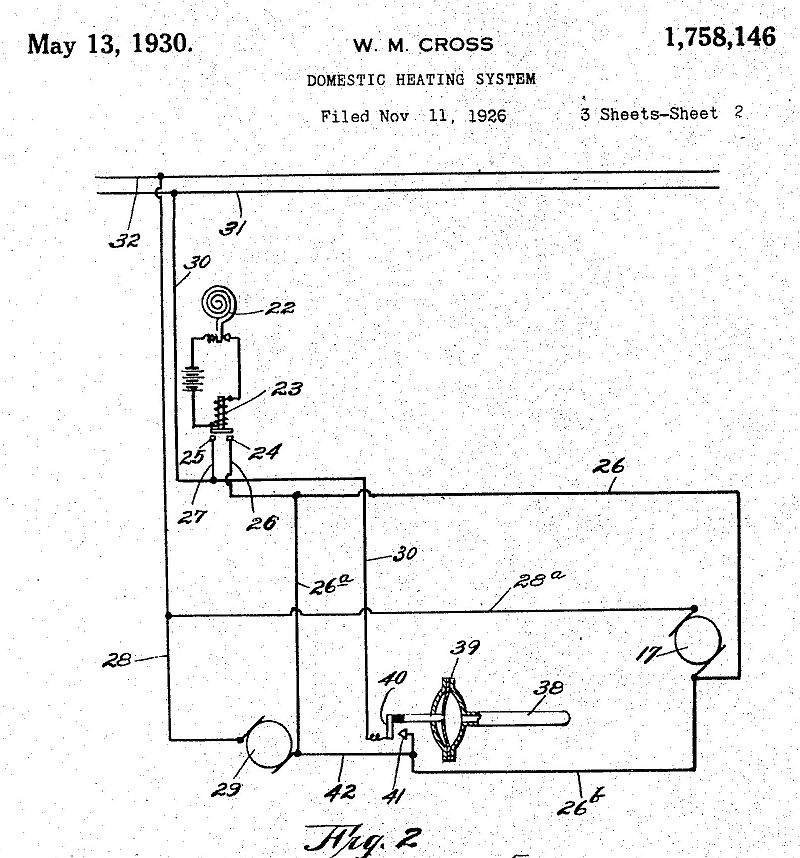
The Cross Furnace Control System

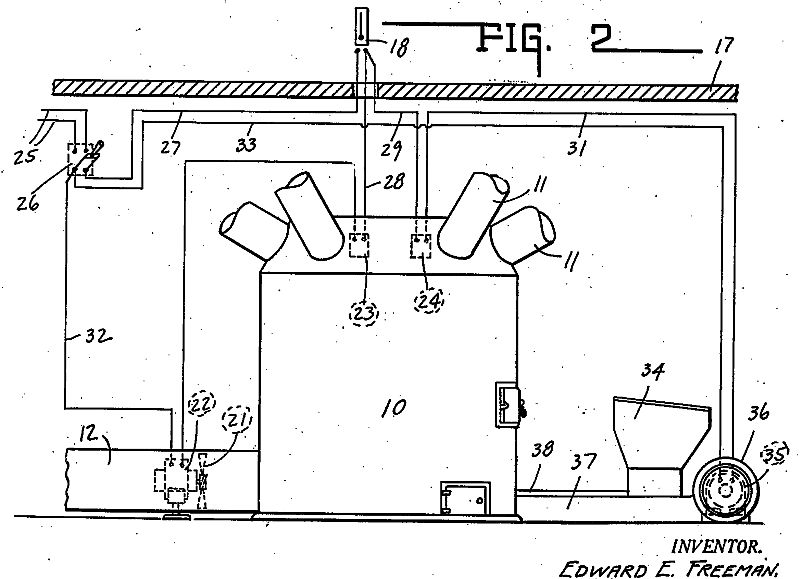
The Freeman Furnace System

=== The inventions ===
Walter M. Cross invented a hot-air furnace system with three main elements: (1) a motor driven stoker for feeding fuel to the combustion chamber of a furnace, (2) a room thermostatic switch for controlling the feeding of fuel, and (3) a combustion stoker switch to prevent the fire's going out in warm weather not requiring domestic heating. The room thermostat the supply of heat, or discontinues its supply, by closing or opening the circuit to the stoker motor at the required temperatures. The combustion stoker switch, or holdfire control, responds to a low temperature in the furnace by causing the stoker to feed fuel so as to prevent the furnace fire from going out. The control of the combustion stoker switch is effective in mild weather when the room thermostat may not call for heat for a considerable period.

Edward E. Freeman invented a system to control a hot air furnace that uses three thermostatic switches for its operation. A room thermostat starts the stoker. Another thermostat (or limit switch) opens the stoker circuit when the air in the furnace reaches a predetermined temperature, irrespective of the fact that the room thermostat may still call for heat. This second thermostat operates to prevent unsafe conditions due to overheating. The third thermostat is also in the furnace. It controls a fan which forces hot air from the furnace to the rooms. It does not permit the fan to start until the air in the furnace reaches a specified degree of heat. But, at that point, it starts the fan, which continues to run, even though the limit switch has stopped the stoker, so long as the furnace is hot and the room thermostat calls for heat. The patent was on the combination patent of three thermostatic switches, not on any of the switches alone and not on the combination of the fan switch and the limit switch.

=== Exploitation of patents ===
The Cross patent was assigned to Mid-Continent, subject to a prior exclusive license to Minneapolis-Honeywell Regulator Company (Honeywell) in the field of coal stokers. It was agreed that the patent royalty Honeywell would pay would be based on its sales of a combustion stoker control unit: an automatic electric switch responsive to temperatures of combustion gases or boiler water produced by an automatic coal fed stoker. Honeywell granted a sub-license to Detroit Lubricator Co. to make and sell combustion stoker switches and related apparatus for practicing the Cross invention. Mid-Continent, the patent owner, made no heating equipment but derived its revenue from royalties on the combustion stoker switch devices that Honeywell and Detroit Lubricator. Honeywell sent a letter to the trade advising it of the exclusive license, explaining that the patent rights cover a system involving the controls and the stoker in combination and not the controls alone, and offering a license on the entire system to purchasers of one of Honeywell's control units. Later, Mid-Continent sent a letter to the trade advising that it owned the patent rights and that the sale of equipment for practicing the patented invention was infringement unless licensed. Mid-Continent wrote a customer of Mercoid that it had learned that the customer was purchasing controls from a company (i.e., Mercoid) not licensed by Mid-Continent to sell controls; and that Mid-Continent wished to make this a formal notification that it considered the sale and use of controls for this purpose an infringement of its patent.

The Freeman patent was assigned to Honeywell, which licensed five of its manufacturing competitors. The licenses grant a nonexclusive right to make, use, and sell a "combination furnace control" which is defined as a thermostatic switch usable for a Freeman installation and designed in one unit to control the fan and limit circuits. Royalty payments to Honeywell are based on the sales of the combination furnace controls, which are not patented as such (the system that includes them is patented) but have no use except in practicing the patent. The court of appeals said that the combination furnace control provides "the sequence of operations which is the precise essence of Freeman's advance in the art," in that it "accomplish[es] the sequence of operations of the Freeman patent" and "distinguish[ed] the invention" from the prior art. Each licensee was required to provide a notice to the effect that purchasing the control confers a license for one installation of the Freeman heating system. Minneapolis-Honeywell tried on several occasions to induce Mercoid to take a license but was unsuccessful.

=== Proceedings in lower courts ===
==== Trial courts ====
===== Cross patent =====
In November 1932, Mid-Continent mailed Mercoid a formal notice of infringement of the Cross patent. In August 1935, Mid-Continent brought suit against E.O. Smith of Carthage, Missouri, for infringement of the Cross patent by installing in his home a heating system including controls manufactured by Mercoid. Mercoid provided the defense of Smith but was not made a party to the suit. Mid-Continent prevailed against Smith. In September 1940, Mid-Continent sued Mercoid in Chicago federal district court for contributory infringement of the Cross patent. Mercoid, Mid-Continent, and Honeywell did not make heating systems; they sold thermostatic switches and related products. On Mercoid's motion, the court made Honeywell an involuntary co-plaintiff.

The district court found that Honeywell and Mid-Continent "have in collusion conspired with each other in an attempt to monopolize the sale of combustion stoker switches, stoker controls or low limit controls, not covered by the Cross [patent]." It also held that the eight-year delay between the 1932 notice and the 1940 suit constituted laches precluding the action. The court concluded that the method of doing business was "the practical equivalent of granting a written license with the condition that the patented system may be practiced only with combustion stoker switches purchased from" licensees, thus running afoul of Carbice and Leitch. In addition to being patent misuse, the plaintiffs' conduct violated the antitrust law and made Mercoid entitled to an injunction against it.

The court ordered that the complaint should be dismissed, and enjoined each plaintiff from bringing suit for contributory infringement of the patent against Mercoid's customers, and from directly or indirectly threatening its customers with suit for such infringement of the patent, or in any manner interfering with Mercoid's business by use of the patent. On the antitrust claim, the court denied damages but ordered a perpetual injunction against both plaintiffs, their officers and agents, both individually and collectively, from doing the following things:

1. From further engaging in or carrying out said conspiracy or any other conspiracy having a similar purpose or effect;
2. From doing any act or thing having the same purpose or effect as the acts done in pursuance of such controversy, or promoting, or tending to promote the purpose or effect thereof involving the patent in suit; and
3. From enforcing or carrying out, directly or indirectly, any of the provisions of the Honeywell license or its sub-licenses, or any similar licenses of the same tenor or effect, which involve the patent.

===== Freeman patent =====
In June 1940 Mercoid sued Honeywell and Mid-Continent in Chicago federal district court for a declaratory judgment that its fan and limit controls did not infringe or contribute to the infringement of Honeywell's Freeman patent, that the patent was invalid, and that Honeywell was restraining trade in violation of the antitrust laws. Honeywell counterclaimed and sued for patent infringement. The district court held the patent not shown invalid but misused. The court explained the misuse:

[I]t must be held that Minneapolis-Honeywell has been so using its patent as to tend to create a monopoly in an unpatented device. Minneapolis-Honeywell has been licensing others and has offered to license Mercoid to manufacture, use and sell a single device which embodies within itself two elements of the Freeman patent, namely, the two thermostats which are placed in the furnace hood, one being the fan switch and the other being the limit switch. This device, embodying these two elements, is . . . an unpatented device. The Freeman patent is not a patent on either the fan switch or the limit switch or both of them. It is a patent on a system of furnace control, which requires three thermostats for its operation. It happens that two of those thermostats are a fan switch and a limit switch. The court is of the opinion that it follows, from what has been said, that both complaints, that of Mercoid and that of Minneapolis-Honeywell, must be dismissed for want of equity.

==== Rulings of Seventh Circuit ====
Appeals were taken to the Seventh Circuit, which overturned the district courts' judgments.

===== Cross patent =====
In one case, involving the Cross patent, the court of appeals reversed the rulings as to laches and contributory infringement. It held that Mercoid's conduct in making and selling a device that had no use except in practicing the Cross patent, and providing instructions on how to use the device to carry out the invention, was contributory infringement. By the same token, the court said, "We see nothing here that would violate the antitrust laws or that would constitute unfair competition," and it reversed the district court's ruling.

===== Freeman patent =====
In the other case, involving the Freeman patent, the court of appeals held that the principle of Morton Salt Co. v. G.S. Suppiger Co. did not apply and the district court erroneously based its ruling on that case. The Morton case involved a patented mechanism for depositing salt tablets:

The patent was on the mechanism, not on the salt nor on its configuration. Salt is an article of commerce, quite generally used from time immemorial. It is unpatented and is not an element of the patent upon which Morton relied. However, Morton sought to compel the purchasers of its patented mechanism to use only the salt purchased from it, which was in no sense a part of the patent.

In contrast, the Freeman patent covers a furnace control system having a combustion control apparatus as an element of the claimed system. The court said these facts were critical:

[The accused device] provides for the sequence of operations which is the precise essence of Freeman's advance in the art. With each [device], Mercoid provides certain wiring diagrams for installation. The accused device has no other use than for accomplishing the sequence of operations of the Freeman patent.

The court concluded, "The patent laws permit such conduct and the Anti-Trust laws do not forbid it."

== Rulings of Supreme Court ==
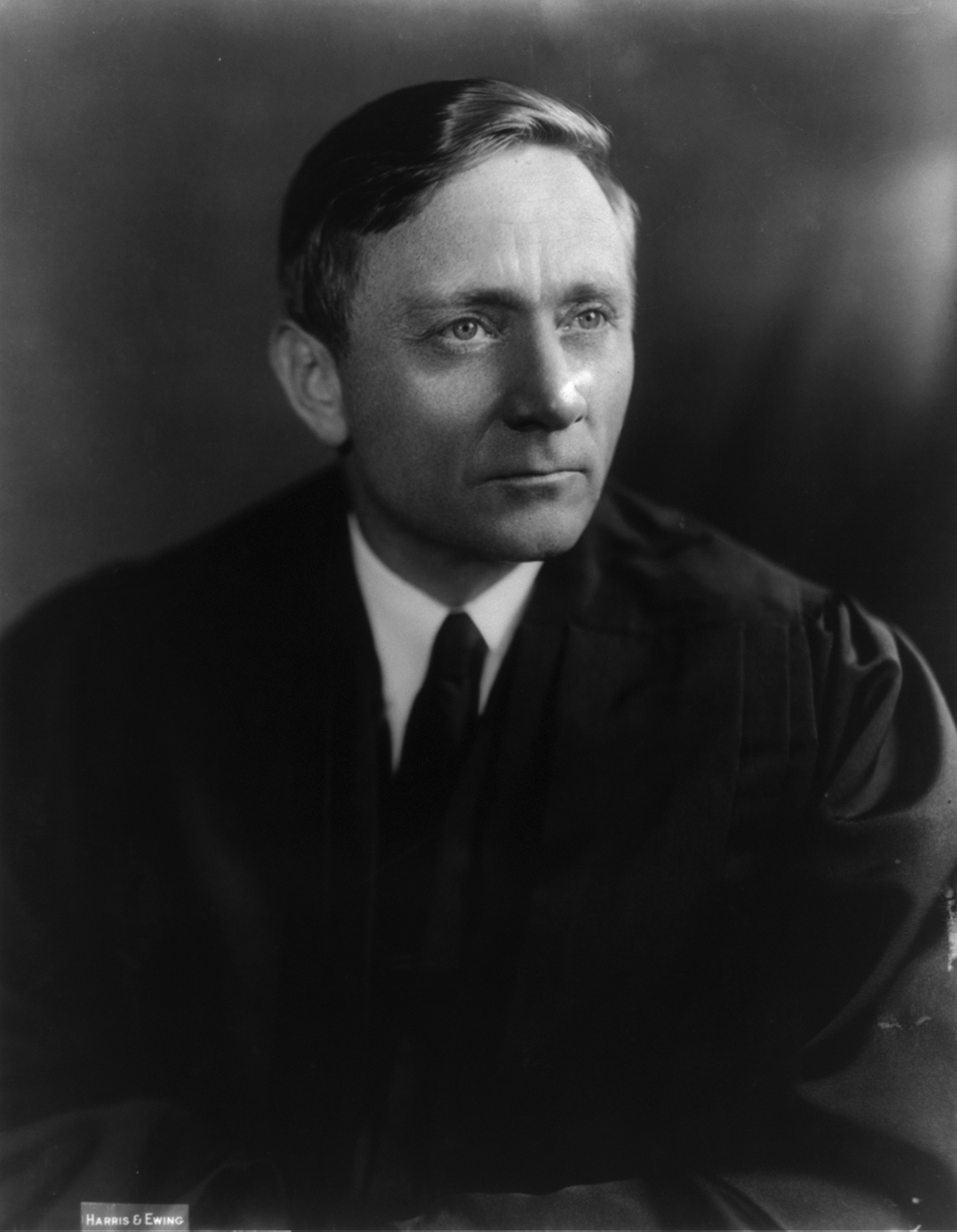
Justice Douglas around 1940

=== Cross patent ===
Justice William O. Douglas delivered the opinion of the majority of the Court. Justice Owen J. Roberts, joined by Justice Stanley Forman Reed, dissented. Justice Felix Frankfurter dissented separately, as did Justice Robert H. Jackson. Justice Hugo Black, joined by Justice Frank Murphy wrote a concurring opinion taking issue with the opinion that Justice Frankfurter filed.

==== Majority opinion ====
Justice Douglas began the majority opinion with the assumptions that the Cross patent was valid and that Mercoid knowingly sold combustion stoker switches for use in practicing the invention claimed in the Cross combination patent.

But ever since the Court in Motion Picture Patents Co. v. Universal Film Mfg. Co. overruled Henry v. A.B. Dick Co., "this Court has consistently held that the owner of a patent may not employ it to secure a limited monopoly of an unpatented material used in applying the invention." For example: Carbice Corp. v. American Patents Development Corp., Leitch Manufacturing Co. v. Barber Co., Morton Salt Co. v. G.S. Suppiger Co., and B.B. Chemical Co. v. Ellis. The reason that the Court has repeatedly so held is that "to allow such suits would be to extend the aid of a court of equity in expanding the patent beyond the legitimate scope of its monopoly."

While those cases all involved tie-ins on supplies used in practicing the patented invention, the Court could "see no difference in principle" when the tied item was a component of the patented structure (a claimed element of a patented combination):

The grant of a patent is the grant of a special privilege "to promote the Progress of Science and useful Arts." Const., Art. I, § 8. It carries, of course, a right to be free from competition in the practice of the invention. But the limits of the patent are narrowly and strictly confined to the precise terms of the grant. It is the public interest which is dominant in the patent system. It is the protection of the public in a system of free enterprise which , , , denies to the patentee after issuance [of the patent] the power to use it in such a way as to acquire a monopoly which is not plainly within the terms of the grant. The necessities or convenience of the patentee do not justify any use of the monopoly of the patent to create another monopoly. The fact that the patentee has the power to refuse a license does not enable him to enlarge the monopoly of the patent by the expedient of attaching conditions to its use. The method by which the monopoly is sought to be extended is immaterial. The patent is a privilege. But it is a privilege which is conditioned by a public purpose. It results from invention, and is limited to the invention which it defines. When the patentee ties something else to his invention, he acts only by virtue of his right as the owner of property to make contracts concerning it and not otherwise. He then is subject to all the limitations upon that right which the general law imposes upon such contracts. . . . [If patent ownership could justify tie-ins] the patent would be diverted from its statutory purpose and become a ready instrument for economic control in domains where the antitrust acts or other laws not the patent statutes define the public policy.

Returning to the patentee's argument that the stoker switch was central to the invention, the Court insisted that it did not matter:

That result may not be obviated in the present case by calling the combustion stoker switch the "heart of the invention" or the "advance in the art." The patent is for a combination only. Since none of the separate elements of the combination is claimed as the invention, none of them when dealt with separately is protected by the patent monopoly. Whether the parts are new or old, the combination is the invention and it is distinct from any of them. If a limited monopoly over the combustion stoker switch were allowed, it would not be a monopoly accorded inventive genius by the patent laws, but a monopoly born of a commercial desire to avoid the rigors of competition fostered by the antitrust laws. If such an expansion of the patent monopoly could be effected by contract, the integrity of the patent system would be seriously compromised.

The Court acknowledged that the 1909 decision in Leeds & Catlin v. Victor Talking Machine Co. (No. 2) was authority for the conclusion that "he who sells an unpatented part of a combination patent for use in the assembled machine may be guilty of contributory infringement." In that case involving a phonograph record and record player, the Court extended patent protection to the unpatented phonograph record, which was an unpatented part of the patented combination. But that ruling "is in substance inconsistent with the view which we have expressed in this case." Accordingly, the rule in that case "must no longer prevail against the defense that a combination patent is being used to protect an unpatented part from competition." To be sure, Honeywell and Mid-Continent could have prevailed against Mercoid on a charge of contributory infringement and secured an injunction "had they not misused the patent for the purpose of monopolizing unpatented material." But they did, and "[w]here there is a collision between the principle of the Carbice case and the conventional rules governing either direct or contributory infringement, the former prevails."

The Court then announced the controversial summary of it holding that later raised a storm of opposition that led to an amendment (see below) of the patent laws limiting the Mercoid ruling:

The result of this decision, together with those which have preceded it, is to limit substantially the doctrine of contributory infringement. What residuum may be left we need not stop to consider. It is sufficient to say that, in whatever posture the issue may be tendered, courts of equity will withhold relief where the patentee and those claiming under him are using the patent privilege contrary to the public interest.

Finally, the Court turned to the issues ofres judicata and Mercoid's antitrust counterclaim, on which several justices dissented.

Mercoid knew of Mid-Continent's actions and the license agreement prior to 1935 when the earlier Smith suit involving the validity of the Cross patent occurred, and in which Mercoid defended its customer Smith. The contention therefore was that the doctrine of res judicata "binds Mercoid as respects issues which were actually litigated and all issues which might have been raised in that earlier suit." As to res judicata, the Court said that Honeywell and Mid-Continent:

ask the equity court for an injunction against infringement by petitioner of the patent in question, and for an accounting. Should such a decree be entered, the Court would be placing its imprimatur on a scheme which involves a misuse of the patent privilege and a violation of the antitrust laws. It would aid in the consummation of a conspiracy to expand a patent beyond its legitimate scope. But patentees and licensees cannot secure aid from the court to bring such an event to pass, "unless it is in accordance with policy to grant that help." And the determination of that policy is not "at the mercy" of the parties nor dependent on the usual rules governing the settlement of private litigation. Courts of equity may, and frequently do, go much farther both to give and withhold relief in furtherance of the public interest than they are accustomed to go when only private interests are involved. . . . The parties cannot foreclose the courts from the exercise of that discretion by the failure to interpose the same defense in an earlier litigation.

The antitrust counterclaim was "more than a defense; it is a separate statutory cause of action." Therefore, the antitrust case is governed by the principle that, "where the second cause of action between the parties is upon a different claim, the prior judgment is res judicata not as to issues which might have been tendered, but "only as to those matters in issue or points controverted upon the determination of which the finding or verdict was rendered." That relief should be considered on the remand.

==== Dissenting opinions ====
Justice Roberts, joined by Justice Reed, took the position that the Leeds & Catlin case should be considered good law, so that there was no misuse here. He also believed that the case did not call for an exception to the usual rukes of res judicata: "We are now told that a misconstruction of the patent law by a licensor is so violent and flagrant a flouting of the public interest that a court of equity must hold its hand for the benefit of a defendant whenever he chooses to invoke that interest for his private benefit, though he has failed to make the defense in an earlier litigation and stands of record an infringer." If a wrong against the public has been perpetrated, he said, let the Government sue.

Justice Frankfurter agreed with the Court's extension of the Carbice rule to cases in which "the unpatented appliance was not for common use, but was . . . adapted for the practice of the invention," but only so long as it was not shown that the item (such as the stoker switch) was not "made for the purpose, and with the intent, of their being combined by a party having no right to combine them." The doctrine of contributory infringement, thus understood, is a proper "expression both of law and morals." He then said that the majority opinion would by its unnecessary dicta embarrass litigants and lower courts "by gratuitous innuendos against a principle of the law which, within its proper bounds, is accredited by legal history as well as ethics." He also agreed with Justice Roberts that res judicata calls for affirmance.

Justice Jackson agreed with the other dissenters about res judicata but he agreed with the majority as to contributory infringement and misuse. This patent, he said, "covers a combination—a system—a sequence—which is said to be new, although every element and factor in it is old and unpatentable. Thus, we have an abstract right in an abstruse relationship between things in which individually there is no right—a legal concept which either is very profound or almost unintelligible, I cannot be quite sure which." He recognized that "[i]f the patentee may not exclude competitors from making and vending strategic unpatented elements, such as the thermostat, adapted to use in the combination, the patented system is so vulnerable to competition as to be almost worthless. On the other hand, if he may prohibit such competition, his system patent gathers up into its monopoly devices long known to the art, and hence not themselves subject to any patent." He then referred to Justice Frankfurter's proposals:

It is suggested that such a patent should protect the patentee at least against one who knowingly and intentionally builds a device for use in the combination and vends it for that purpose. That is what appears to have been done here. As to ethics, the parties seem to me as much on a parity as the pot and the kettle. But want of knowledge or innocent intent is not ordinarily available to diminish patent protection. I do not see how intent can make infringement of what otherwise is not. The less legal rights depend on someone's state of mind, the better.

He concluded:

The practical issue is whether we will leave such a combination patent with little value indeed, or whether we will give it value by projecting its economic effects to elements not by themselves a part of its legal monopoly. In these circumstances, I think we should protect the patent owner in the enjoyment of just what he has been granted—an abstract right in an abstruse combination—worth whatever such a totality may be worth. I see no constitutional or statutory authority for giving it additional value by bringing into its monopoly all or any of the unpatentable parts.

==== Concurring opinion ====
Justice Black, joined by Justice Murphy, concurred specially "to add a few remarks in order that silence may not be understood as acquiescence in the views expressed in the dissenting opinion" of Justice Frankfurter. First, he said, the Court's ruling involved no dicta; what was said was necessary to resolve the case. More important, he condemned the dissent's "error of interpreting legislative enactments on the basis of a court's preconceived views on 'morals' and 'ethics.' " Nothing in the federal patent statute refers to contributory infringement. The basis of the dissent's arguments is "the writer's personal views on 'morals' and 'ethics.' ":

[None of that] throws enough light on the patent statutes to justify its use in construing these statutes as creating, in addition to a right of recovery for infringement, a more expansive right judicially characterized as a "formula" of "contributory infringement." And for judges to rest their interpretation of statutes on nothing but their own conceptions of "morals" and "ethics" is, to say the least, dangerous business.

If the present case compelled consideration of the morals and ethics of contributory infringement, I should be most reluctant to conclude that the scales of moral value are weighted against the right of producers to sell their unpatented goods in a free market. At least since Adam Smith wrote, unhampered competition has not generally been considered immoral. While there have been objections to the Sherman Anti-Trust Act, few if any of the objectors have questioned its morality.

It has long been recognized that a socially undesirable practice may seek acceptance under the guise of conventional moral symbols. And repeated judicial assertion that a bad practice is hallowed by morals may, if unchallenged, help it to receive the acceptance which it seeks. With this in mind, I wish to make explicit my protest against talking about the judicial doctrine of "contributory infringement" as though it were entitled to the same respect as a universally recognized moral truth.

=== Freeman patent ===
As in the preceding case, Justice Douglas delivered the opinion of the Court. Justices Roberts, Reed, Frankfurter, and Jackson concurred in the result on the authority of Morton Salt Co. v. G.S. Suppiger Co.

The Court took issue with the Seventh Circuit's basing its reversal of the district court because the combustion control switch as the heart of the invention. The Court stated:

The fact that an unpatented part of a combination patent may distinguish the invention does not draw to it the privileges of a patent. That may be done only in the manner provided by law. However worthy it may be, however essential to the patent, an unpatented part of a combination patent is no more entitled to monopolistic protection than any other unpatented device. For, as we pointed out in Mercoid Corp. v. Mid-Continent Investment Co., a patent on a combination is a patent on the assembled or functioning whole, not on the separate parts. The legality of any attempt to bring unpatented goods within the protection of the patent is measured by the antitrust laws, not by the patent law.

Accordingly, the "effort here made to control competition in this unpatented device plainly violates the antitrust laws," Mercoid is entitled to antitrust relief, and Honeywell "may not obtain from a court of equity any decree which directly or indirectly helps it to subvert the public policy which underlies the grant of its patent."

== Subsequent developments ==
It was said that the Mercoid cases "effectively eliminated a patent holder's ability to prevent a competitor from making and selling a component that had no use other than as part of a patented invention," and that as a result, "Congress stepped in to breathe new life into the doctrine of contributory infringement and to push back the borders of the patent misuse doctrine."

The Supreme Court, in Dawson Chemical Co. v. Rohm & Haas Co., analyzed the legislative history of the 1952 amendment that addressed this issue in the new sections 271(c) and (d) of the patent law. Referring to the Mercoid cases, the Court said that they "definitely held that any attempt to control the market for unpatented goods would constitute patent misuse, even if those goods had no use outside a patented invention." The Dawson Court observed that the series of decisions leading up to the Mercoid cases "involved undoing the damage thought to have been done by A.B. Dick." Moreover, "The desire to extend patent protection to control of staple articles of commerce died slowly, and the ghost of the expansive contributory infringement era continued to haunt the courts."

The result was:

The Mercoid decisions left in their wake some consternation among patent lawyers and a degree of confusion in the lower courts. Although some courts treated the Mercoid pronouncements as limited in effect to the specific kind of licensing arrangement at issue in those cases, others took a much more expansive view of the decision. Among the latter group, some courts held that even the filing of an action for contributory infringement, by threatening to deter competition in unpatented materials, could supply evidence of patent misuse.

This consternation led to lobbying efforts before Congress:

Certain segments of the patent bar eventually decided to ask Congress for corrective legislation that would restore some scope to the contributory infringement doctrine. With great perseverance, they advanced their proposal in three successive Congresses before it eventually was enacted in 1952.

The Dawson Court said that the resulting amendment was a compromise. The "codification of contributory infringement and patent misuse reveals a compromise between those two doctrines and their competing policies that permits patentees to exercise control over non-staple articles used in their inventions." This undid the specific holding in the Mercoid cases, for:

§ 271(d) effectively confer[s] upon the patentee, as a lawful adjunct of his patent rights, a limited power to exclude others from competition in nonstaple goods. A patentee may sell a nonstaple article himself while enjoining others from marketing that same good without his authorization. By doing so, he is able to eliminate competitors, and thereby to control the market for that product. Moreover, his power to demand royalties from others for the privilege of selling the nonstaple item itself implies that the patentee may control the market for the nonstaple.
