= B.B. Chemical Co. v. Ellis =

- Supreme Court of the United States

Argued December 10, 1941 Decided January 5, 1942
- Full case name: B.B. Chemical Co. v. Ellis
- Citations: 314 U.S. 495 (more) 62 S. Ct. 406; 86 L. Ed. 367; 1942 U.S. LEXIS 1243; 52 U.S.P.Q. (BNA) 33

Case history
- Prior: 32 F. Supp. 690 (D. Mass. 1940); 117 F.2d 829 (1st Cir. 1941)

Court membership
- Chief Justice Harlan F. Stone Associate Justices Owen Roberts · Hugo Black; Stanley F. Reed · Felix Frankfurter; William O. Douglas · Frank Murphy; James F. Byrnes · Robert H. Jackson

Case opinion
- Majority: Stone, joined by Black, Reed, Frankfurter, Douglas, Murphy, Byrnes, Jackson
- Roberts took no part in the consideration or decision of the case.

B.B. Chemical Co. v. Ellis, 314 U.S. 495 (1942), is a United States Supreme Court decision involving the patent misuse doctrine and the extent of remedies a court should award after finding a misuse that the patentee alleges it has now discontinued. The Court ruled that to be able to enforce the patent against infringement the patentee must show that it has fully abandoned its unlawful practice and that the consequences of that practice have been fully dissipated. This was a companion case to Morton Salt Co. v. G.S. Suppiger Co. decided on the same day.

== Background ==
=== The invention ===
Elmer Ellis invented a method of improving the coating of fabrics for shoe insoles, and received U.S. Pat. No. 1,830,428, which he assigned to plaintiff B.B. Chemical Co. for $8000. Before Ellis's invention, it was the practice in the manufacture of shoes to reinforce insoles by cementing a layer of textile fabric material shaped to the "lip" (edge) of the insole, to reinforce the lip, thus forming a more secure anchorage for the inseam stitches. The usual practice had been to employ a strip of fabric of approximately the width of the insole, having coats of thermoplastic material which had to be heated just prior to its application to the insole in order to secure proper adhesion. The degree of heat required was dangerously high, and considerable skill on the part of the operator was required in order to produce uniform results. This was commonly known as the "hot process." There was also, a process known as the "cold process", but it was considered unsatisfactory in the trade.

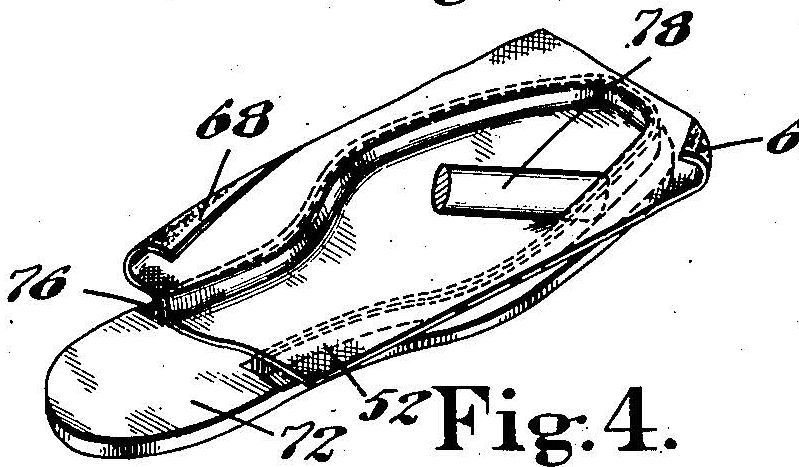
Ellis's insole fabric reinforcement

Ellis invented a method in which he coated a fabric with a rubber composition. After heating and drying, the non-tacky web was then cut into strips and wound into rolls. The next step in the process was to apply a coating of rubber cement to the pre-coated material just before the strip was applied to the insole. This application is made by the shoe manufacturer. The fabric thus coated is then at once applied to the insole and "formed in" around the lip, usually with a hand tool. This process does not require heat when it is inserted into the shoe.

The relevant claim of the patent is claim 4:

[An] improvement in methods of reinforcing insoles which comprises:

applying, at room temperature, to a strip of reinforcing material provided with a dry coating of a cement having a substantial rubber content, a coating of adhesive containing a relatively large amount of rubber and of such a character that it will be effective even when freshly applied to cause quick adhesion of the reinforcing material and the material of the insole, and
applying to each other, still at room temperature, a portion of the coated strip and the insole to be reinforced.

=== B.B. Chemical's business plan ===
B.B. Chemical supplied shoe manufacturers, for use in reinforcing insoles, pre-coated fabric that it had slit into strips of suitable width. If the manufacturer desired, B.B. Chemical supplied the fabric, pre-coated it, and slit it. B.B. Chemical also supplied adhesive, to be applied to the pre-coated fabric at the shoe factory immediately prior to the application of the reinforcing material to the insole, and also provided machines suitable for use in applying the adhesive to the strips, the machines being and remaining the property of B.B. Chemical. These machines were covered by patents that B.B. Chemical owned. B.B. Chemical, in addition, gave instructions to operators, serviced the machines and advised and assisted in the reinforcing operation. As compensation for the foregoing, B.B. Chemical made a single charge to the shoe manufacturers at a rate per web yard of fabric supplied. If the manufacturer did not furnish the fabric, the price of that material was added to the charge. The adhesives used by B.B. Chemical in pre-coating the fabric have all had a large rubber content but were made according to different formulae, developed from time to time by B.B. Chemical with special reference to the patent. B.B. Chemical did not grant written licenses to shoe manufacturers, nor was any such license ever requested. Neither by notice or by agreement in any form with its customers did it require them to use only B.B. Chemical's material.

Ellis subsequently developed a similar process and became a competitor of B.B. Chemical, which sued for contributory infringement of the patent.

=== District court ruling ===
The district court found that the process Ellis used was equivalent to the patented process, leaving the only issue whether B.B. Chemical misused the patent and therefore was not entitled to relief.

The district court found that B.B. Chemical's method of doing business brought it within the prohibition of Carbice Corp. v. American Patents Development Corp. and Leitch Mfg. Co. v. Barber Co. B.B. Chemical stressed that it did not require its customers to agree to buy the pre-coated fabric from it or grant licenses on that condition. It also stressed that the pre-coated fabric, although unpatented, was not a staple but was specially adapted for use in practicing the patented process. Moreover, as the court agreed, B.B. Chemical could not practicably practice the patent in its own factory. The district court dismissed these arguments. The Leitch case held that a "method of doing business which leads to such suppression of competition in unpatented commodities will be enough" to "prevent success in a suit against a competitor for contributory infringement." Also, "the rule was not to be limited to efforts of a patentee to control the use of staple materials." Finally: "The fact that plaintiff's method of conducting its business is the most practical method is not a controlling factor. The question cannot be decided as a matter of convenience to either plaintiff or defendant."

=== First Circuit ruling ===
B.B. Chemical appealed to the First Circuit, which affirmed the dismissal. That court said: "The plaintiff's course of business is precisely that of the patentee in Leitch Mfg. Co. v. Barber Co." The First Circuit turned to the staple versus non-staple argument that B.B. Chemical made:

The plaintiff seeks to prevent the application of this rule [Leitch] to this case by limiting the doctrine to those situations in which the alleged contributory infringer supplies staple articles of commerce. It insists that where the articles supplied are specially manufactured for use in this particular process, relief is not to be denied the patentee no matter what his course of business. It points to dry ice, bituminous emulsion, and lecithin as such staple articles. . . . The language of those cases is extremely comprehensive and is by no means restricted to staple articles. . . . There is every indication that the Carbice and Leitch cases apply to specially designed non-patented articles.

== Ruling of Supreme Court ==
Chief Justice Harlan Stone delivered an opinion for a unanimous Court, affirming the judgment below.

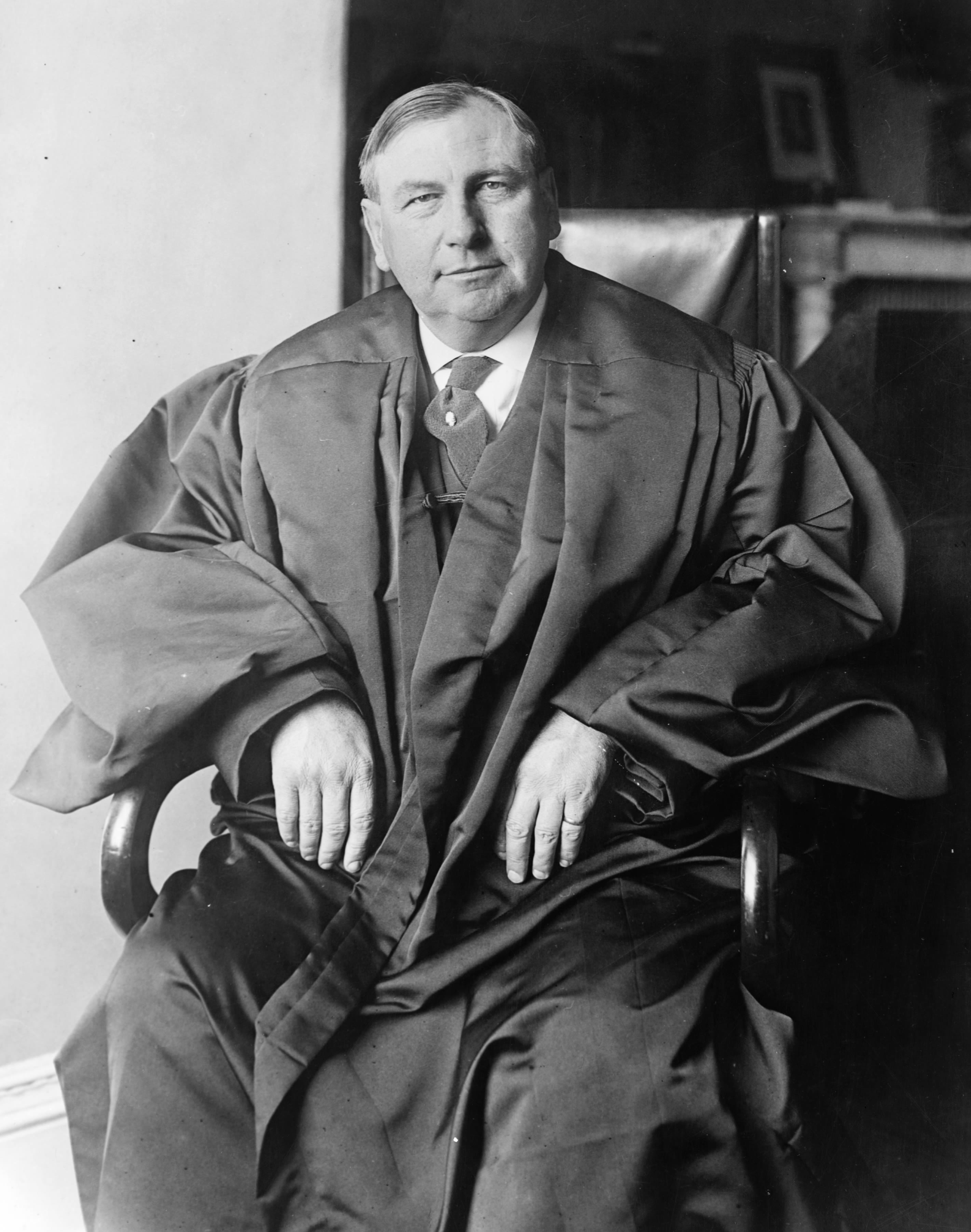
Chief Justice Harlan Fiske Stone

B.B. Chemical argued that the conduct of defendant Ellis went beyond that of the defendants in the Carbice and Leitch cases. Ellis's conduct "amounted to active inducement of infringement by the shoe manufacturers and to cooperation with their infringing acts." B.B. Chemical insisted that "even though, under the Carbice and Leitch cases, it has 'no right to be free from competition in the sale' of the materials, it has the right under the patent law to restrain infringement in any manner other than by the competitive sale of the unpatented materials."

The Court responded that "the maintenance of this suit to restrain any form of infringement is contrary to public policy, and that the district court rightly dismissed it." Furthermore:

It is without significance that, as petitioner contends, it is not practicable to exploit the patent rights by granting licenses because of the preferences of manufacturers and of the methods by which petitioner has found it convenient to conduct its business. The patent monopoly is not enlarged by reason of the fact that it would be more convenient to the patentee to have it so, or because he cannot avail himself of its benefits within the limits of the grant. It will be appropriate to consider petitioner's right to relief when it is able to show that it has fully abandoned its present method of restraining competition in the sale of unpatented articles, and that the consequences of that practice have been fully dissipated.

=== Purgation ===
B.B. Chemical then asked for an exception to the misuse rule "because it is now willing to give unconditional licenses to manufacturers on a royalty basis, which it offers to do." The Court replied: "It will be appropriate to consider petitioner's right to relief when it is able to show that it has fully abandoned its present method of restraining competition in the sale of unpatented articles, and that the consequences of that practice have been fully dissipated." This rule is known as the "purging" doctrine in patent misuse law.
