= Lisenba v. California =

Lisenba v. People of State of California
- Supreme Court of the United States

Reargued October 14–15, 1941 Decided December 8, 1941
- Full case name: Raymond Lisenba v. The People of the State of California
- Citations: 314 U.S. 219 (more) 62 S. Ct. 280; 86 L. Ed. 166; 1941 U.S. LEXIS 36

Case history
- Prior: People v. Lisenba, 14 Cal. 2d 403, 94 P.2d 569 (1939); affirmed, 313 U.S. 537 (1941); rehearing granted, 313 U.S. 597 (1941)
- Subsequent: 315 U.S. 826

Holding
- The Court affirmed the Supreme Court of California's decision to deny the petitioner a writ of habeas corpus based on the methods used by law enforcement officials to procure his confession to murder.

Court membership
- Chief Justice Harlan F. Stone Associate Justices Owen Roberts · Hugo Black; Stanley F. Reed · Felix Frankfurter; William O. Douglas · Frank Murphy; James F. Byrnes · Robert H. Jackson

Case opinions
- Majority: Roberts, joined by Stone, Reed, Frankfurter, Murphy, Byrnes, Jackson
- Dissent: Black, joined by Douglas

Laws applied
- U.S. Const.

Lisenba v. California, 314 U.S. 219 (1941), was a case in which the United States Supreme Court upheld the criminal conviction and death sentence imposed upon a man who confessed to murder after being detained for more than 24 hours, slapped and deprived of sleep and food. The petitioner argued that the confession was coerced, and that it violated his due process rights under the Fourteenth Amendment to the U.S. Constitution.

== Facts ==
=== Murder of Mary Busch ===
Major Raymond Lisenba (a.k.a. "Robert S. James") worked as a barber in La Cañada Flintridge, California in the 1930s. His wife was a manicurist named Mary Busch. In 1935, Lisenba purchased a life insurance policy on his wife. A few months later, he purchased several rattlesnakes, which were used in an unsuccessful attempt to murder his wife. Hours later, Mary was found dead by drowning. Investigators from the insurance company discovered that Lisenba had been married several times previously and that one of his prior wives had died under similar circumstances.

=== Decision ===
The majority of the Supreme Court found that the police officers violated state law when they illegally detained Lisenba for two days, assaulted him, and denied him access to counsel. However, the court found that these illegal acts did not themselves constitute a due process violation, asserting that Lisenba had confessed of his own free will after being confronted with the testimony of an accomplice, not directly after the interrogation.

Justice Owen J. Roberts' opinion reads, in part:

Counsel had been afforded full opportunity to see [Lisenba] and had advised him. He exhibited a self-possession, a coolness, and an acumen throughout his questioning, and at his trial, which negatives the view that he had so lost his freedom of action that the statements made were not his but were the result of the deprivation of his free choice to admit, to deny, or to refuse to answer.

=== Dissent ===
Justice Hugo Black, joined by Justice William O. Douglas, used the facts of the case to decide in favor of the petitioner, noting the case's factual similarities to Chambers v. Florida, a landmark 1940 case (argued before the court by future Justice Thurgood Marshall on behalf of the petitioner) in which the court ruled that confessions compelled by police through duress are inadmissible at trial.

Black's dissenting opinion describes the circumstances of Lisenba's confession:

Suspecting the defendant of murder they entered his home on Sunday, April 19, 1936, at 9 a.m. He was taken to a furnished house next door, in which the State's Attorney's office had installed a dictaphone. For the next forty-eight hours, or a little longer, the State's Attorney, his assistants, and investigators held James as their prisoner. He was so held not under indictment or warrant of arrest but by force. At about 4 a.m. Monday, one Southard, an investigator, 'slapped' the defendant, whose left ear became red and swollen. James was apparently kept at the State's Attorney's office during the daylight hours; the full extent to which he was questioned there is not clear. But on Monday and Tuesday nights, at the furnished house, with no one present but James and the officers, he was subjected to constant interrogation. The questioning officers divided themselves into squads, so that some could sleep while the others continued the questioning. The defendant got no sleep during the first forty-two hours after the officers seized him. And about 3:30 or 4 a.m. Tuesday morning, while sitting in the chair he occupied while being interrogated, at the very moment a question was being asked him, the defendant fell asleep. There he remained asleep until about 7 or 8 a.m. At about 11 a.m. the officers took him to jail and booked him on a charge of incest. During the entire forty- two hours defendant was held, he repeatedly denied any complicity in or knowledge of the murder of his wife.

== Aftermath ==
On May 1, 1942, Lisenba was executed by hanging at San Quentin State Prison in California.

== See also ==
- Rattlesnake James
- Death penalty
