= Edwards v. California =

- Supreme Court of the United States

Argued April 28–29, 1941 Reargued October 21, 1941 Decided November 24, 1941
- Full case name: Edwards v. People of State of California
- Citations: 314 U.S. 160 (more) 62 S. Ct. 164; 86 L. Ed. 119; 1941 U.S. LEXIS 1143

Case history
- Prior: Probable jurisdiction noted, 61 S. Ct. 395 (1941); reargument ordered, 313 U.S. 545 (1941).

Holding
- A state cannot prohibit indigent people from moving into it.

Court membership
- Chief Justice Harlan F. Stone Associate Justices Owen Roberts · Hugo Black; Stanley F. Reed · Felix Frankfurter; William O. Douglas · Frank Murphy; James F. Byrnes · Robert H. Jackson

Case opinions
- Majority: Byrnes, joined by Stone, Roberts, Reed, Frankfurter
- Concurrence: Douglas, joined by Black, Murphy
- Concurrence: Jackson

Edwards v. People of State of California, 314 U.S. 160 (1941), is a landmark United States Supreme Court case where a California law prohibiting the bringing of a non-resident "indigent person" into the state was struck down as unconstitutional.

The so-called anti-Okie law made it a misdemeanor to bring into California "any indigent person who is not a resident of the State, knowing him to be an indigent person." Edwards was a Californian who had driven to Texas and returned with his unemployed brother-in-law. He was tried, convicted and given a six-month suspended sentence.

On appeal from the Superior Court of Yuba County, the Supreme Court unanimously vacated the verdict and declared the law unconstitutional, as violating the Constitution's Commerce Clause. Justice Byrnes wrote the majority opinion. In concurring opinions, Justices Douglas joined by Justices Black and Murphy, and Justice Jackson held that the law violated the Privileges or Immunities clause of the Fourteenth Amendment.

== Background ==
Edwards was a citizen of the United States and a Californian resident. In December 1939, he left his home in Marysville for Spur, Texas, with the intent of picking up his brother-in-law, Frank Duncan, a citizen of the US and of Texas, and returning home to California with Duncan. During the course of his trip, Edwards was made aware of the fact that Duncan was unemployed and had little money and few personal possessions.

As such, Duncan was classified as an indigent individual under California state law, the transportation of which into the state was strictly prohibited under Section 2615 of the Welfare and Institutions Code of California: "Every person, firm or corporation, or officer or agent thereof that brings or assists in bringing into the State any indigent person who is not a resident of the State, knowing him to be an indigent person, is guilty of a misdemeanor."

A complaint was subsequently filed against Edwards in Justice Court, where he was convicted and sentenced to six months imprisonment in the county jail. Edwards appealed to the Superior Court of Yuba County and later to the Supreme Court of the United States, on the argument that his sentence was unconstitutional on the basis that the California law violated the Commerce Clause.

== Holding ==
The Court found that Section 2615 of the Welfare and Institutions Code of California violated Article 1, Section 8 of the Constitution.

== Concurrences ==
In writing their concurring opinions, the additional justices chose to forgo the explanation that California had violated Article 1, Section 8 of the Constitution, arguing that defining the transportation of human beings as “commerce” raises a number of troubling moral questions which undermine individual rights and devalue the original intent of the Commerce Clause. Instead, they propose the idea that the impairment of one's ability to freely traverse interstate borders is a violation of the implied rights of US citizenship, and thereby violates the 14th Amendment and the individual's right to equal protection.

== See also ==
- List of United States Supreme Court cases, volume 314
- Shapiro v. Thompson (1969)
- Saenz v. Roe (1999)
