= Rattlesnake James =

Convicted murderer (1894–1942)

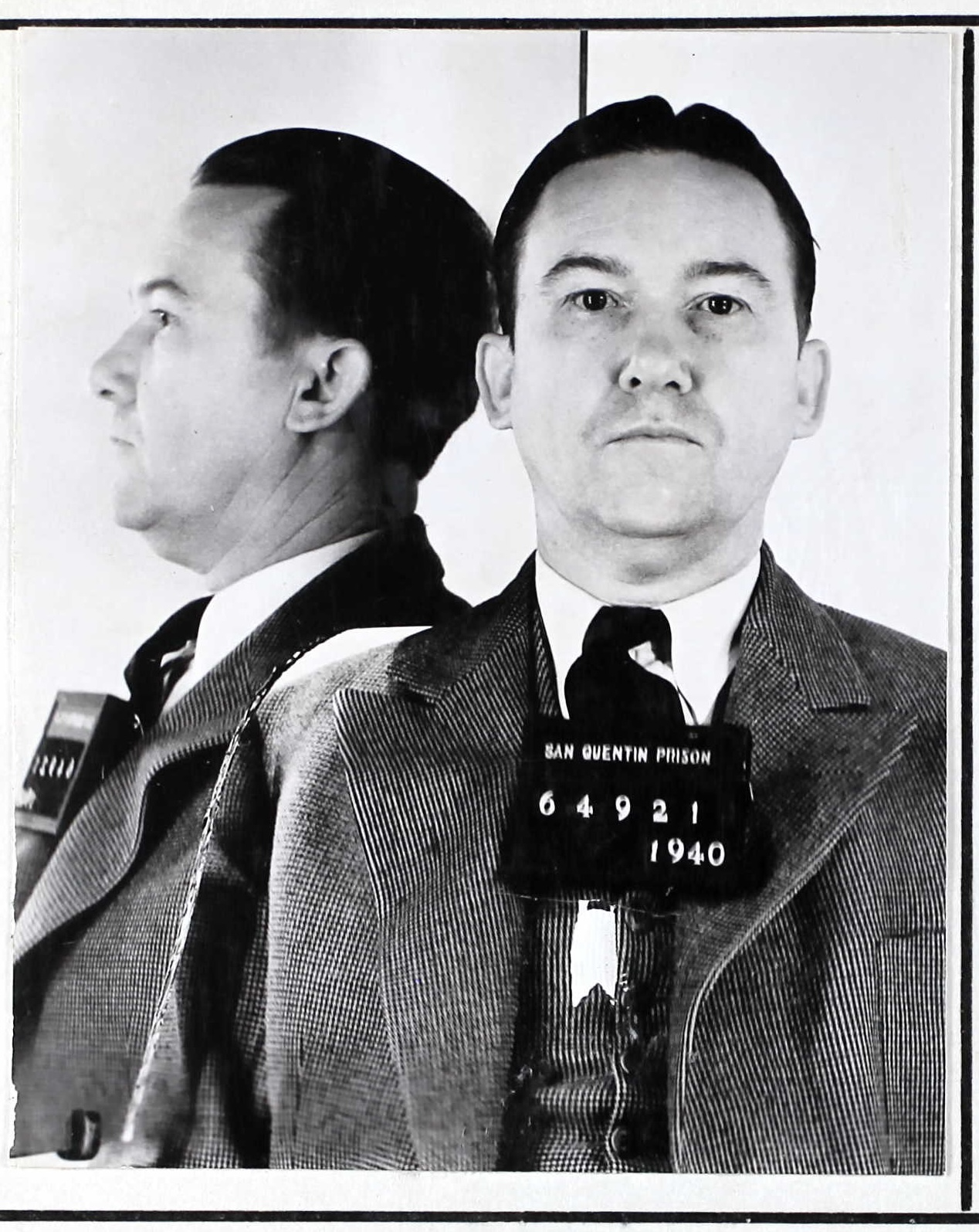
- Lisenba at the San Quentin State Prison (1940)
- Born: Major Raymond Lisenba; March 6, 1894; Hale County, Alabama, U.S.
- Died: May 1, 1942 (aged 48); San Quentin State Prison, California, U.S.
- Known for: Becoming the last person to be executed by hanging in California
- Motive: Life insurance money
- Convictions: First degree murder Incest (3 counts)
- Penalty: Death

Major Raymond Lisenba (March 6, 1894 – May 1, 1942) also known as Major Lisby, Robert Sherwood James, "Rattlesnake James" or the Rattlesnake Murderer, was the last man to be executed by hanging in California. He was charged with murdering his wife, Mary Emma Busch, to collect her life insurance benefit. Per the Associated Press, Busch was the last of James's six wives. He was suspected of killing his fourth wife, Winona Wallace, and his nephew, Cornelius Wright, to collect on life insurance benefits. Lisenba was also convicted on three counts of incest with his niece, Lois Wright, and sentenced to 3 to 150 years in prison. Wright was an adult at the time of James's arrest, but 17 at the start of the relationship.

== Biography ==
The Associated Press described him as paunchy, beady-eyed, auburn-haired, and "possessing a way with women." He was born in 1894, the fourth child of Julius C. Lisenba and Mary Emma Parmentier. His father was a sharecropper, and he was taken out of school at age eight to do agricultural work. A native of Hale County, Alabama, Lisenba first worked in the cotton fields and then was sent to barber school by his sister's husband. James would later take the daughter of this sister and husband with him to Hollywood, where they had a sexual relationship until his arrest on murder charges.

At the time of the 1900 census the family was in Cottondale, Tuscaloosa County and his father worked as a farmer. By the time of the 1910 census he was living with the family of his oldest sister, Anna; 16-year-old Lisenba and his brother-in-law were both employed in coal mining.

Major Lisenba, age 21, married his first wife, Maud Duncan, age 19, on October 8, 1914, in Birmingham, Jefferson, Alabama. (She may actually have been 16 years old.) On 5 Jun 1917, he reports as married, with "wife, baby, mother dependents" for his U.S., World War I Draft Registration. He enlisted and served as a U.S. Marine Corps private during WWI. He "failed to return" to her after the war. She soon filed for divorce, accusing him of "kinky" and "sadistic" sex. Later in life he refused to name her and claimed he had left her because "she had put ground glass and poison in his food."

Lisenba moved to Kansas and remarried, but his second wife divorced him after the father of a pregnant young woman ran him out of town. According to another account, he married Vera Mae Vermillion in Kansas; she ended the marriage "after a few months" because of Lisenba's serial infidelity. It appears that Major Lisenba changed his name between 1917 and 1925 to Robert S. James. In the 1925 Kansas State Census, "R.S. James" (family 920) appears with wife Vera May James, and as "Robert S. James" (family 133) with wife Vera May James, mother-in-law Maud Vermillion, and brother-in-law Wayne Vermillion in Emporia, Lyon, Kansas, United States.

Lisenba moved to California in 1932 with his then 17-year-old niece Lois Wright, who had Hollywood ambitions. The two had a consensual sexual relationship together until his arrest on murder charges. After he was the sole beneficiary of an uncle's $4,000 life insurance policy, James got the idea of committing fraud. He married Winona Wallace of Glendale, California. He got a pair of $5,000 insurance policies for both from Prudential Insurance. On September 21, the couple was driving on Pikes Peak Highway near Glen Cove, Colorado, with Wallace at the wheel when "the steering knuckle broke," the car left the road and fell down a mountainside. James had apparently "hit his wife on the head with a hammer, then sent her down a cliff in their car." James told investigators he managed to jump free, but Wallace remained trapped in the vehicle until it stopped against a large boulder about 150 feet below the road. When rescuers got to the scene, they found Wallace alive with relatively minor injuries despite the intensity of the crash. She also smelled of liquor and had a massive wound behind her ear. A coroner later (1935?) removed bullet fragments from her brain. Wallace was released from the hospital on October 8 and recovering at a tourist cabin in Manitou Springs when about a week later, James and a grocer found her lying on her back in a half-filled tub. At the coroner's inquest, medical examiner George B. Gilmore testified that James told him his wife had ignored physician's orders to avoid washing her hair because of the head wound and drowned as a result.

James soon wrote to Dr. George B. Gilmore, Manitou coroner, asking him to alter the death certificate so he could collect double indemnity on his wife's life. He pointed out that Winona's death had not been due not merely to drowning, but that the head injury she received in the accident had been a contributing cause. Dr. Gilmore thought this a reasonable request—and James collected $14,000.

— Daily News, August 2, 1936

Prudential eventually paid off on Wallace's policy. Following the death of Busch, an autopsy was made on Wallace and the medical examiner testified that she suffered two skull fractures caused by a hard, moving object projected against in it. At the later "rattlesnake murder" trial, the Colorado toll-road operator to whom James had reported the accident testified that James' "shoes were not muddy and there were no footprints in the soft dirt of the hillside," which contradicted James' claim that he had jumped from the out-of-control car to safety.

Robert James reported his next wife was Ruth Thomas but said he wasn't sure about their marriage because he was drunk. She was a beauty shop operator and the wedding was October 8, 1934 in New Orleans. He reported the marriage annulled in New Orleans in 1934. James reportedly had the marriage annulled because she wouldn't "take the physical required" for him to get life insurance on her.

James took out an insurance policy on his nephew Cornelius Wright, a young sailor. James invited Wright to visit him while he was on leave. In 1935, the subsequent visit, James allowed his nephew to use his car. Wright thereafter died when he purportedly drove the car off a cliff. Reportedly, "the steering knuckle of his car broke near Santa Rosa, California" and he was killed. The mechanic who towed the wreck back to James told him that something was wrong with the steering wheel. The payout on a $5,000 life insurance on Wright allowed James to purchase a barber shop in Los Angeles.

== Rattlesnake murder ==
In March 1935, Ray James met Mary Emma Busch, who would become his sixth and final wife. On July 19, 1935, they married in Orange County, California; he gave his name as Robert Sherwood James. She worked as a manicurist in his barber shop. In June 1935, Ray asked Charles Hope, one of his loyal customers who was struggling financially, to help him kill Busch for her $5000 life insurance, offering $100 plus expenses for two rattlesnakes, which he planned to use to poison Busch. According to the Associated Press, the prosecution contended during his trial that "he wanted her $21,000 life insurance."

Hope brought the snakes, reportedly named Lightning and Lethal, to the James' house on August 4 to find Busch, who was pregnant at the time, strapped to the kitchen table with her eyes and mouth taped shut. James had told her that if she wanted an illegal abortion, he needed to cover her face "to protect the doctor's identity". James gave Busch a pint of whiskey as "anesthetic". Hope watched as Ray put Busch's foot in the box with the two snakes, which bit her, then left the house to return and pick up his wife.

Returning to the house at 1:30 a.m. on August 5, 1935, Hope found that Busch was still alive. Drunk and outraged, Ray took her to the bathtub, drowned her, and put her body by the fish pond in their backyard in an attempt to make it look like an accident. Hope left, having refused James's order to burn down the house. Busch's death was ruled a drowning until a drunken Hope bragged at a bar about his involvement in her murder. The bartender reported this to police and Hope was arrested. According to another version, by Los Angeles journalist and historian Cecilia Rasmussen, "James confidently tried to redeem his insurance policy on Mary. But an insurance investigator discovered that the barber had been married five times and that his third wife had last died by drowning, and tipped the police."

Under intense questioning, Hope explained the plot thoroughly and James was arrested in 1936. A snake bite on Busch's toe overlooked during the autopsy confirmed this.

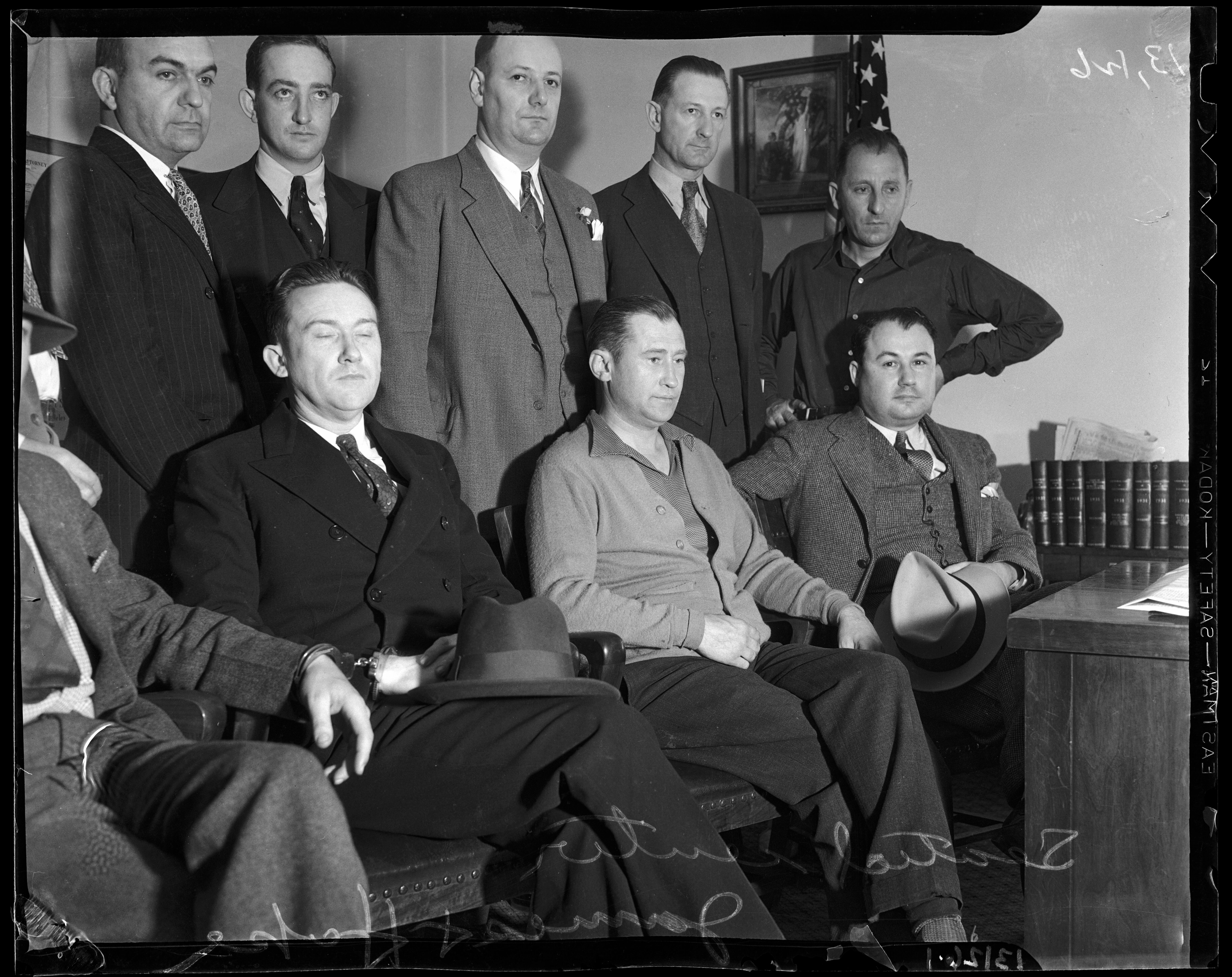
Robert S. James and Charles S. Hope, accused of the murder of James's wife Busch, Los Angeles, 1936 (Los Angeles Daily News Negatives Collection via UCLA Digital)

A live rattlesnake brought to the trial as evidence escaped into the courtroom and caused a ruckus. Both James and Hope were found guilty of their crimes, with James being sentenced to death and Hope to life in prison. James led a Bible study group while on death row.

On May 1, 1942, Rattlesnake James was executed by hanging at San Quentin State Prison in California. Prior to the execution he told the chaplain he thought God had forgiven him for his "bad life." The rope was the wrong length and it took over ten minutes for Rattlesnake James to die.

== See also ==
- Capital punishment in California
- Capital punishment in the United States
- Lisenba v. People of State of California
- List of people executed in the United States in 1942
