= Barber Asphalt Company =

Former Asphalt, Tanker and Shipping Company

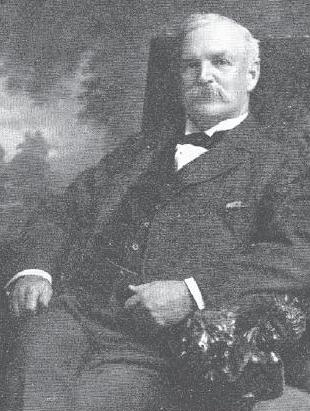
- Industry: Amzi L. Barber's Oil, Gas, Asphalt and shipping
- Founded: 1883 in Washington, D.C., United States
- Defunct: 1981
- Fate: Sold
- Key people: Amzi L. Barber, Avery D. Andrews
- Products: Asphalt, shingles, oil and gas
- Subsidiaries: Iroquois Electric Refrigeration Company, Iroquois division

The Barber Asphalt Company, founded in 1883 by Amzi L. Barber, initially started in Washington, D.C. and later moved its headquarters to New York City. The company leased the largest known asphalt deposit at Pitch Lake, Trinidad in 1888 and expanded its operations with various offices and subsidiaries. After several mergers and name changes, including a joint venture with Standard Oil in 1946, the company played a significant role in paving millions of miles of roads. The Barber Asphalt Company also operated a fleet of tankers and coal ships which were used to contribute to the US Merchant Marine during World War II. The company closed in 1981, selling its assets to various corporations.

== History ==
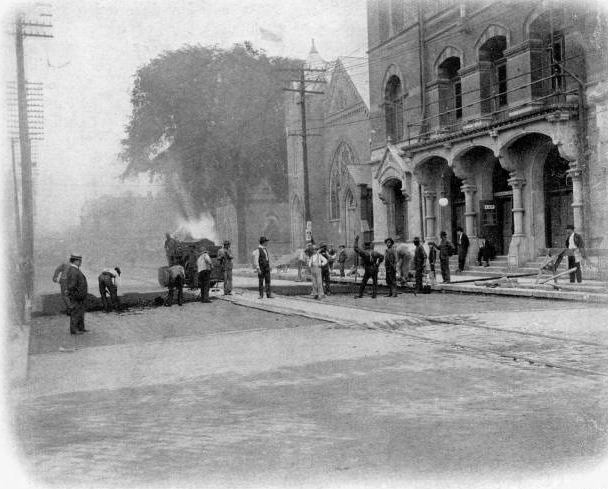
Barber Asphalt Company's Men Laying Trinidad Pitch Lake Asphalt on a Fort Wayne Street, Fort Wayne, Indiana in 1906

The Barber Asphalt Company of Washington, D.C. was founded in 1883 was founded by Amzi L. Barber. Barber, born in 1843. began his first career as a teaching professor, and then moved into real estate. While working In real estate, he was impressed by the need for affordable paved roads. He found that asphalt was a great affordable material for paved roads. Later, he added asphalt shingles to his products.

In 1879 Barber moved his headquarters to New York City. He had offices in Washington, D.C. from 1878 to 1912; Philadelphia, Pennsylvania from 1912 to 1938; and Maurer, Perth Amboy, New Jersey from 1938 to 1948. In 1888 Barber leased the largest known asphalt deposit at Pitch Lake, Trinidad.

The company underwent a number of splits, mergers, name changes, and purchases. Barber opened a subsidiary, called the Iroquois division, and Iroquois Electric Refrigeration Company. Elkins Widener purchased the company in 1898 and merged it with his Trinidad Corporation subsidiary. This formed the Asphalt Company of America of New York. In 1899 the Asphalt Company of America was sold to John M. Mack and renamed the National Asphalt Company of America. By 1900, the company had laid over 12 million square yards of Trinidad asphalt pavement in 70 American cities at a cost of $35 million. Barber retired from the business in 1901, just before the trust collapsed, but returned to the industry in 1904.

Barber's business interests continued to grow and change in the 1900s. In 1901 Barber retired from the Barber Asphalt Company, and the National Asphalt Company of America closed in 1902. In 1903 it opened again as General Asphalt Company. Uintah Railway Company was founded in 1903 by the Barber Asphalt Paving Company. In 1904 Barber returned to the company. In the 1920s Barber Asphalt Company opened a refinery in Perth Amboy, New Jersey, where at the time the town was known as Barber. The Barber Asphalt refinery now became the Perth Amboy Refinery. The General Asphalt and Barber divisions merged in 1936. After the merger, the name was changed to Barber Company, Inc.. In 1938 the name was changed to Barber Asphalt Corporation. Barber Asphalt entered into a joint venture with Standard Oil Company of California in 1946. The joint venture was called California Refining Company.

In 1981 the company closed and sold all its assets. The oil and gas products line (Barber Oil Corporation) was sold to Petro-Lewis Corporation. Shipping interests were sold to Apex Shipping. The Coal products (Barber Paramont Coal) were sold to Hanna Mining Company, W. R. Grace & Company and Liberty Capital Group. American Gilsonite Company stocks were sold to Standard Oil.

Over the years, Barber has paved millions of miles of roads.

== World War II ==
Barber Asphalt Company operated a fleet of oil tankers and coal ships to run Barber Asphalt Company. The ships were used to help the World War II effort. During World War II Barber Asphalt Company operated Merchant navy ships for the United States Shipping Board. During World War II Barber Asphalt Company was active with charter shipping with the Maritime Commission and War Shipping Administration. Barber Asphalt Company operated Liberty ships and tankers for the merchant navy. The ship was run by its Barber Asphalt Company crew and the US Navy supplied United States Navy Armed Guards to man the deck guns and radio.

== Ships ==
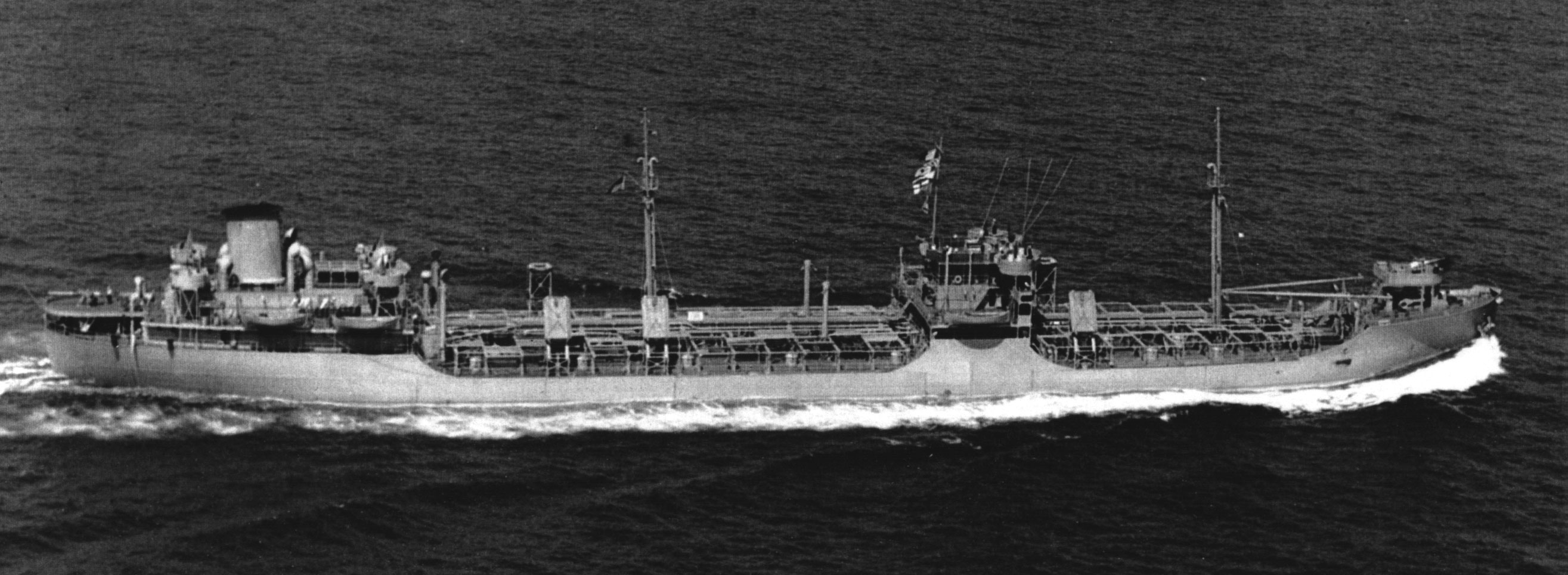
A T2 tanker

Post World War Type Type T2 tanker were sold to Barber Asphalt Company and Trinidad Corporation:

- Birch Coulie, T2 tanker
- Chapultepec, T2 Tanker, 26 Dec 1943 was damaged by torpedo, was repaired.
- Luckystar, T2 Tanker
  - Fruitvale Hills, T2 Tanker, used 1947–1965, was widened and lengthened, renamed San Antonio.
- Carleton Ellis, Tanker a Liberty Armadillo-class tanker
  - Liberty ships operated during World War 2 only:
- Carleton Ellis
- William E. Pendleton
  - Trinidad Corporation ship:
- SS Fort Mercer T2 Tanker cracked and then broke in two in a gale in 1952. repaired and rename San Jacinto, explosion-split T2 tanker in 1964.
- Houston, T2 was SS Caribbean
- Lyons Creek, T2 Tanker
- Clarke's Wharf T2 Tanker
- La Brea Hills T2 Tanker
- New Market T2 Tanker
- Redstone T2 Tanker
- Tillamook T2 Tanker
- Admiralty Bay, built 1971, scrapped 1993
  - Leased ships:
- USS Mascoma 1947 to 1948.

== See also ==
- World War II United States Merchant Navy
- Leitch Manufacturing Co. v. Barber Co.
