= List of United States Supreme Court cases, volume 314 =

This is a list of all the United States Supreme Court cases from volume 314 of the United States Reports:

Case name	Citation	Date decided
Alabama v. King	314 U.S. 1	1941
Curry v. United States	314 U.S. 14	1941
A prime contractor to the federal government is an independent contractor, not an agent of the government.
Bernards v. Johnson	314 U.S. 19	1941
Reitz v. Mealey	314 U.S. 33	1941
Baltimore and Ohio Railroad Company v. Kepner	314 U.S. 44	1941
City of Indianapolis v. Chase National Bank	314 U.S. 63	1941
Cuno Engineering Corporation v. Automatic Devices Corporation	314 U.S. 84	1941
Automatic Devices Corporation v. Sinko Tool and Manufacturing Company	314 U.S. 94	1941
Federal Land Bank v. Bismarck Lumber Company	314 U.S. 95	1941
Commercial Molasses Corporation v. New York Tank Barge Corporation	314 U.S. 104	1941
Toucey v. New York Life Insurance Company	314 U.S. 118	1941
Southern Railroad Company v. Painter	314 U.S. 155	1941
Edwards v. California	314 U.S. 160	1941
United States v. Kales	314 U.S. 186	1941
Pink v. A.A.A. Highway Express, Inc.	314 U.S. 201	1941
United States v. Kansas Flour Mills Corporation	314 U.S. 212	1941
Lisenba v. California	314 U.S. 219	1941
Parker v. Motor Boat Sales, Inc.	314 U.S. 244	1941
Bridges v. California	314 U.S. 252	1941
Pierce v. United States	314 U.S. 306	1941
American Surety Company v. Bethlehem National Bank	314 U.S. 314	1941
Textile Mills Sec. Corporation v. Commissioner	314 U.S. 326	1941
United States v. Santa Fe Pac. R.R. Co.	314 U.S. 339	1941
New York City and S.L. Railroad Company v. Frank	314 U.S. 360	1941
Duckworth v. Arkansas	314 U.S. 390	1941
Gray v. Powell	314 U.S. 402	1941
United States v. Emory	314 U.S. 423	1941
District of Columbia v. Murphy	314 U.S. 441	1941
Scaife Company v. Internal Revenue Service	314 U.S. 459	1941
Helvering v. Lerner Stores Corporation	314 U.S. 463	1941
National Labor Relations Board v. Virginia Electric and Power Company	314 U.S. 469	1941
United States v. Texas	314 U.S. 480	1941
Morton Salt Co. v. G.S. Suppiger Co.	314 U.S. 488	1942
B.B. Chemical Company v. Ellis	314 U.S. 495	1942
Illinois Natural Gas Company v. Central Illinois Public Service Company	314 U.S. 498	1942
Ex parte Colonna	314 U.S. 510	1942
National Labor Relations Board v. P. Lorillard Company	314 U.S. 512	1942
United States v. Ragen	314 U.S. 513	1942
Continental Casualty Company v. United States	314 U.S. 527	1942
Board of Trade v. United States	314 U.S. 534	1942
Fischer v. American United Life Insurance Company	314 U.S. 549	1942
Irving Trust Company v. Day	314 U.S. 556	1942
Meilink v. Unemployment Reserves Commission	314 U.S. 564	1942
