= Morton Salt Co. v. G.S. Suppiger Co. =

- Supreme Court of the United States

Argued December 10, 1941 Decided January 5, 1942
- Full case name: Morton Salt Co. v. G.S. Suppiger Co.
- Citations: 314 U.S. 488 (more) 62 S. Ct. 402; 86 L. Ed. 363; 52 U.S.P.Q. 30

Case history
- Prior: G.S. Suppiger Co. v. Morton Salt Co., 117 F.2d 968 (7th Cir. 1941); cert. granted, 313 U.S. 555 (1941).

Court membership
- Chief Justice Harlan F. Stone Associate Justices Owen Roberts · Hugo Black; Stanley F. Reed · Felix Frankfurter; William O. Douglas · Frank Murphy; James F. Byrnes · Robert H. Jackson

Case opinion
- Majority: Stone, joined by Black, Reed, Frankfurter, Douglas, Murphy, Byrnes, Jackson
- Roberts took no part in the consideration or decision of the case.

Morton Salt Co. v. G.S. Suppiger Co., 314 U.S. 488 (1942), is a patent misuse decision of the United States Supreme Court. It was the first case in which the Court expressly labeled as "misuse" the Motion Picture Patent/Carbice tie-in defense to a charge of patent infringement and created the present blanket remedy in infringement cases of unenforceability of the misused patent. The decision re-emphasized that misuse can be found without finding an antitrust violation.

== Background ==
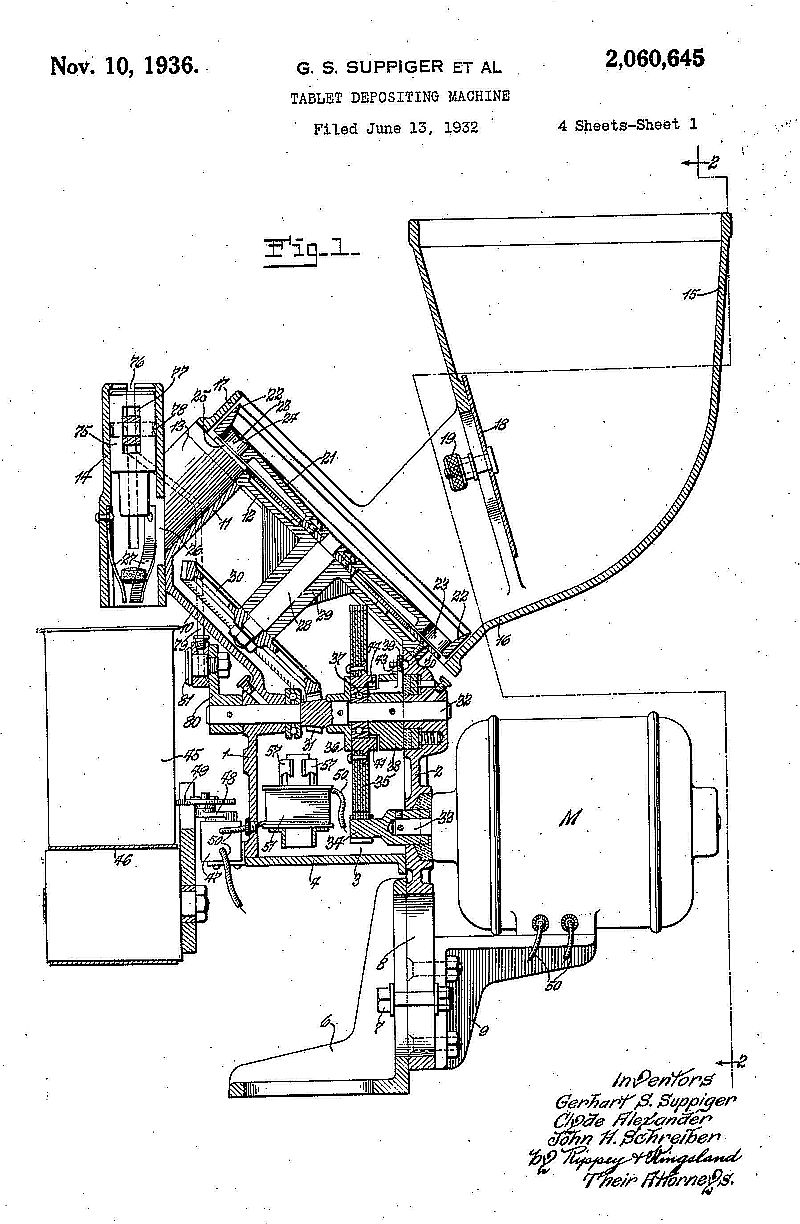
Salt dispensing machine at issue in Suppiger case

=== Facts ===
G.S. Suppiger Co. operated a canning company which had a subsidiary "devoted to making and leasing a patented tablet depositing machine and to making and selling salt tablets of a particular design and configuration." The salt tablets were unpatented, common salt (NaCl) but they had a particular shape to fit the patented salt tablet depositing machine that Suppiger made ("a particular configuration which is required for use in plaintiff's depositing machines for continuous, untroubled use"). Suppiger's leases to canners of tomatoes and other vegetables "included a license to use the patented machine, upon the condition and agreement by the lessee that plaintiff's and its predecessor's salt tablets be used exclusively in said patented, leased machines."

Morton Salt Co. was in the same business and made and leased salt tablet depositing machines alleged to infringe the patent, as well as salt tablets for the machines. Morton also provided in its "leases that the lessee shall use only salt tablets made by it." The facts were undisputed.

=== Proceedings in lower courts ===
Morton sued Suppiger and the district court dismissed the complaint on summary judgment because of "plaintiff's use of its patent to develop a monopoly of an unpatented article, to-wit, salt tablets." The Seventh Circuit reversed because Suppiger controlled only a small amount of the salt market by its tie-in:

The volume of all the salt business is large. The amount used in the canning field is so small that its complete control would not result in a monopoly of the salt industry. It is not the salt tablet as such but the salt which goes into the salt tablet which must determine the monopolistic tendency of plaintiff's lease contracts.

Section 3 of the Clayton Act, 15 U.S.C. § 14, makes certain tie-ins unlawful. "However, unlawfulness is made to depend upon a provision which is here important, where the effect of such lease or such condition may be substantially to lessen competition or tend to create a monopoly in any line of commerce." The record did not support a conclusion that Suppiger's tie-in had such an effect.

Morton appealed to the Supreme Court.

== Ruling of the Supreme Court ==
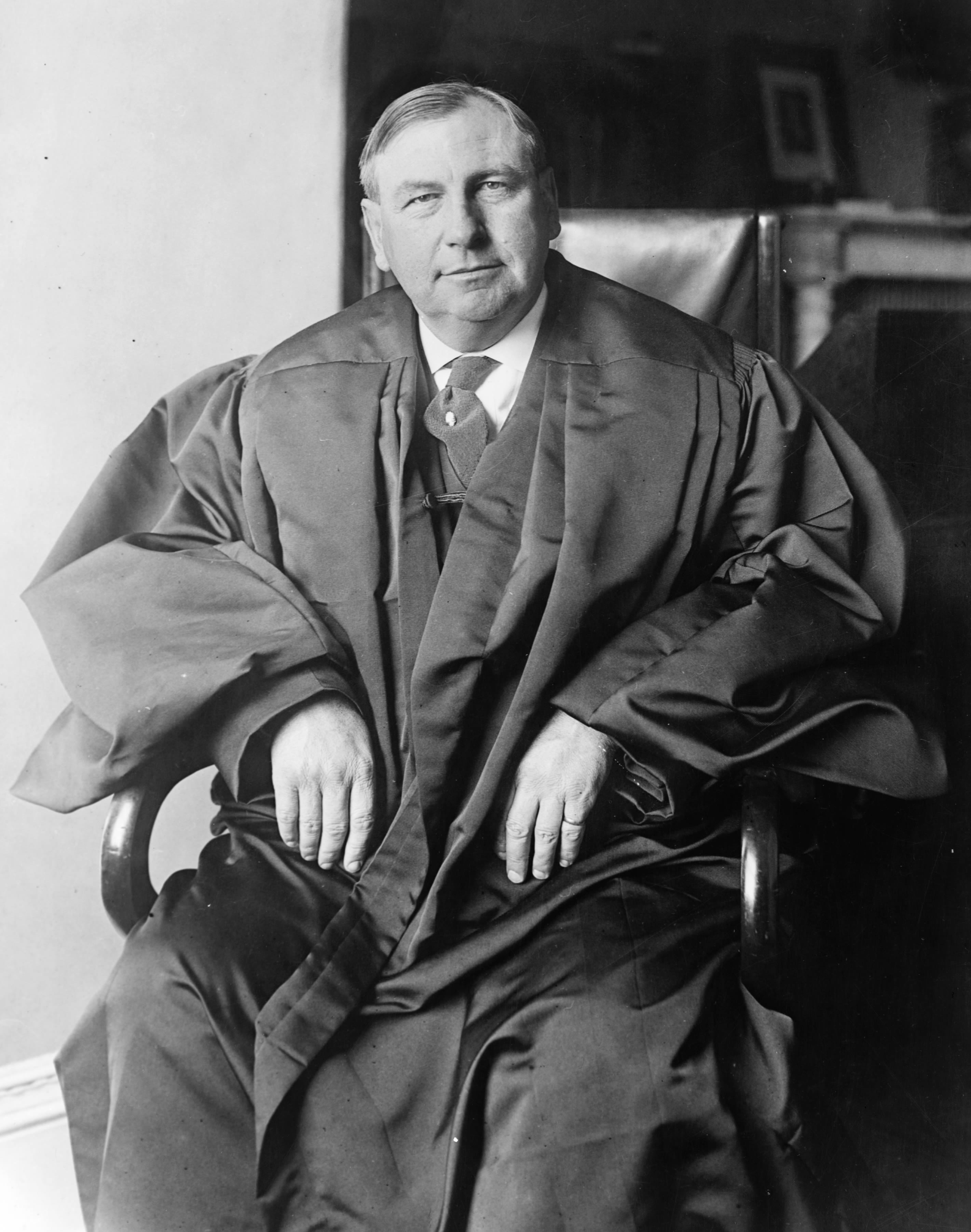
Chief Justice Harlan Fiske Stone

Chief Justice Harlan Stone delivered the opinion of the Court, unanimously reversing the judgment of the Seventh Circuit. He began by stating that the court of appeals misunderstood the relevant issue: "The question we must decide is not necessarily whether respondent has violated the Clayton Act, but whether a court of equity will lend its aid to protect the patent monopoly when respondent is using it as the effective means of restraining competition with its sale of an unpatented article." Moreover, "nothing turns on the fact that petitioner also competes with respondent in the sale of the tablets, and we may assume for purposes of this case that petitioner is doing no more than making and leasing the alleged infringing machines" subject to a tie-in as to the salt tablets.

On these facts, Suppiger "is making use of its patent monopoly to restrain competition in the marketing of unpatented articles, salt tablets, for use with the patented machines, and is aiding in the creation of a limited monopoly in the tablets not within that granted by the patent." Suppiger has a patent on the tablet dispensing machine, not on salt tablets. The patent gives it a monopoly "to make, use, and vend the particular device described and claimed in the patent. But a patent affords no immunity for a monopoly not within the grant."

The policy of the patent system "includes inventions within the granted monopoly [but] excludes from it all that is not embraced in the invention. It equally forbids the use of the patent to secure an exclusive right or limited monopoly not granted by the Patent Office and which it is contrary to public policy to grant." It is well recognized that "courts of equity may appropriately withhold their aid where the plaintiff is using the right asserted contrary to the public interest."

The proper rule in such cases, the Court said, is:

Where the patent is used as a means of restraining competition with the patentee's sale of an unpatented product, the successful prosecution of an infringement suit, even against one who is not a competitor in such sale, is a powerful aid to the maintenance of the attempted monopoly of the unpatented article, and is thus a contributing factor in thwarting the public policy underlying the grant of the patent. Maintenance and enlargement of the attempted monopoly of the unpatented article are dependent to some extent upon persuading the public of the validity of the patent, which the infringement suit is intended to establish. Equity may rightly withhold its assistance from such a use of the patent by declining to entertain a suit for infringement, and should do so at least until it is made to appear that the improper practice has been abandoned and that the consequences of the misuse of the patent have been dissipated.

The reasons for invoking the "clean hands" doctrine to bar the prosecution of an infringement suit against even one who is not a competitor with the patentee in the sale of the unpatented product (here, salt tablets) are fundamentally the same as those which bar an infringement suit against a licensee who has violated a condition of the license by using with the licensed machine a competing unpatented article, as in the Motion Picture Patents case: "It is the adverse effect upon the public interest of a successful infringement suit in conjunction with the patentee's course of conduct which disqualifies him to maintain the suit, regardless of whether the particular defendant has suffered from the misuse of the patent.

These considerations made it unnecessary, the Court added, to decide whether Suppiger had committed an antitrust violation "for we conclude that, in any event, the maintenance of the present suit to restrain petitioner's manufacture or sale of the alleged infringing machines is contrary to public policy, and that the district court rightly dismissed the complaint for want of equity."

== Subsequent development of unenforceability defense ==
The Suppiger case expanded the patent misuse defense from its original rule that a contractual provision considered patent misuse could not be enforced, as in the Motion Picture Patents tie-in case, to a defense in third party infringement suits, as in Suppiger, where the patentee's use of a tie-in disabled it from enforcing its patent against infringement by Morton. The disability continues until the misuse has been fully "purged" and its effects have fully dissipated.

Some critics have argued that this remedy is too harsh, and that it should be enough to require the patentee to stop engaging in the abusive conduct. The Seventh Circuit, in Panther Pumps & Equipment Co. v. Hydrocraft, Inc., effectively limited Suppiger by holding that violations of the rule in Lear, Inc. v. Adkins, against agreements not to challenge patent validity should not lead to the harsh result of making the patent unenforceable against infringement, because such an agreement was "not the kind of misuse which forecloses recovery of damages" from an infringer. On the other hand, such a rule of lenity may encourage patentees to adopt the principle of "nothing ventured, nothing gained."
