= Leitch Manufacturing Co. v. Barber Co. =

- Supreme Court of the United States

Argued December 14, 1937 Decided January 3, 1938
- Full case name: Leitch Manufacturing Co. v. Barber Company
- Citations: 302 U.S. 458 (more) 58 S. Ct. 288; 82 L. Ed. 371; 1938 U.S. LEXIS 76; 36 U.S.P.Q. 35

Case history
- Prior: Barber Asphalt Co. v. Stulz-Sickles Co., 89 F.2d 960 (3d Cir. 1937)

Court membership
- Chief Justice Charles E. Hughes Associate Justices James C. McReynolds · Louis Brandeis; George Sutherland · Pierce Butler; Harlan F. Stone · Owen Roberts; Benjamin N. Cardozo · Hugo Black

Case opinion
- Majority: Brandeis, joined by Hughes, McReynolds, Sutherland, Butler, Stone, Roberts, Black
- Cardozo took no part in the consideration or decision of the case.

Leitch Manufacturing Co. v. Barber Co., 302 U.S. 458 (1938), is a 1938 decision of the United States Supreme Court extending the tie-in patent misuse doctrine to cases in which the patentee does not use an explicit tie-in license but instead relies on grants of implied licenses to only those who buy a necessary supply from it.

== Background ==
=== Facts ===
Barber Asphalt Company acquired Hayden U.S. Patent No. 1,684,671, covering a "Method of preventing evaporation from concrete during curing." The patent describes a process for improving the curing of concrete by retarding the evaporation of water from poured concrete, as in a roadway. The process involves preparing a mixture of bitumen, soap, and water, which forms bituminous emulsion, and spraying this on freshly laid concrete. This forms an insoluble film on the surface of the concrete and by keeping the water in the concrete mixture from evaporating, facilitates a chemical reaction in which water molecules react with calcium hydroxide and other ingredients to form calcium-silicate hydrate. The result is reduced cracking and stronger concrete.

Barber made and sold bituminous emulsion. The product was long known and not patented, and it has many uses besides the patented process. Leitch Manufacturing Company also made and sold bituminous emulsion. Barber's method of exploiting the patent was to sell bituminous emulsion for road building use. It did not make road builders pay a royalty for employing the patented method. It does not grant to road builders a written license to use the process, nor require them to agree to use only Barber's bituminous emulsion when practicing the process. Under U.S. patent law, when a patent owner sells supplies to customers with the understanding that they will use the supplies to practice the patent, the customers get an implied license to use the patent. " On the other hand, the Barber Company sues as a contributory infringer a competing manufacturer of this unpatented material who sells it to a road builder for such use."

Leitch used Stulz-Sickles Company as a jobber to sell bituminous emulsion to the Standard Bitulithic Company, which used the patented process in road construction, and Barber and Stulz-Sickles knew that Standard would so use it.

=== Lower court rulings ===
Barber sued Leitch and Stulz-Sickles. The district court found the patent invalid as anticipated by prior art. On appeal, the Third Circuit reversed (2-1). It found the patent valid and rejected the defense that Barber committed patent misuse by engaging in a tie-in of unpatented supplies, in violation of the rule set out in Carbice Corporation v. American Patents Development Corporation. One judge dissented: "The appellant seeks to restrain the sale of an unpatented ingredient used by it in its process. No patent could have been obtained for bituminous emulsion, a staple article of commerce, and the fact that it is used in the patented process does not entitled the appellant to a monopoly therein. Carbice."

== Ruling of Supreme Court ==
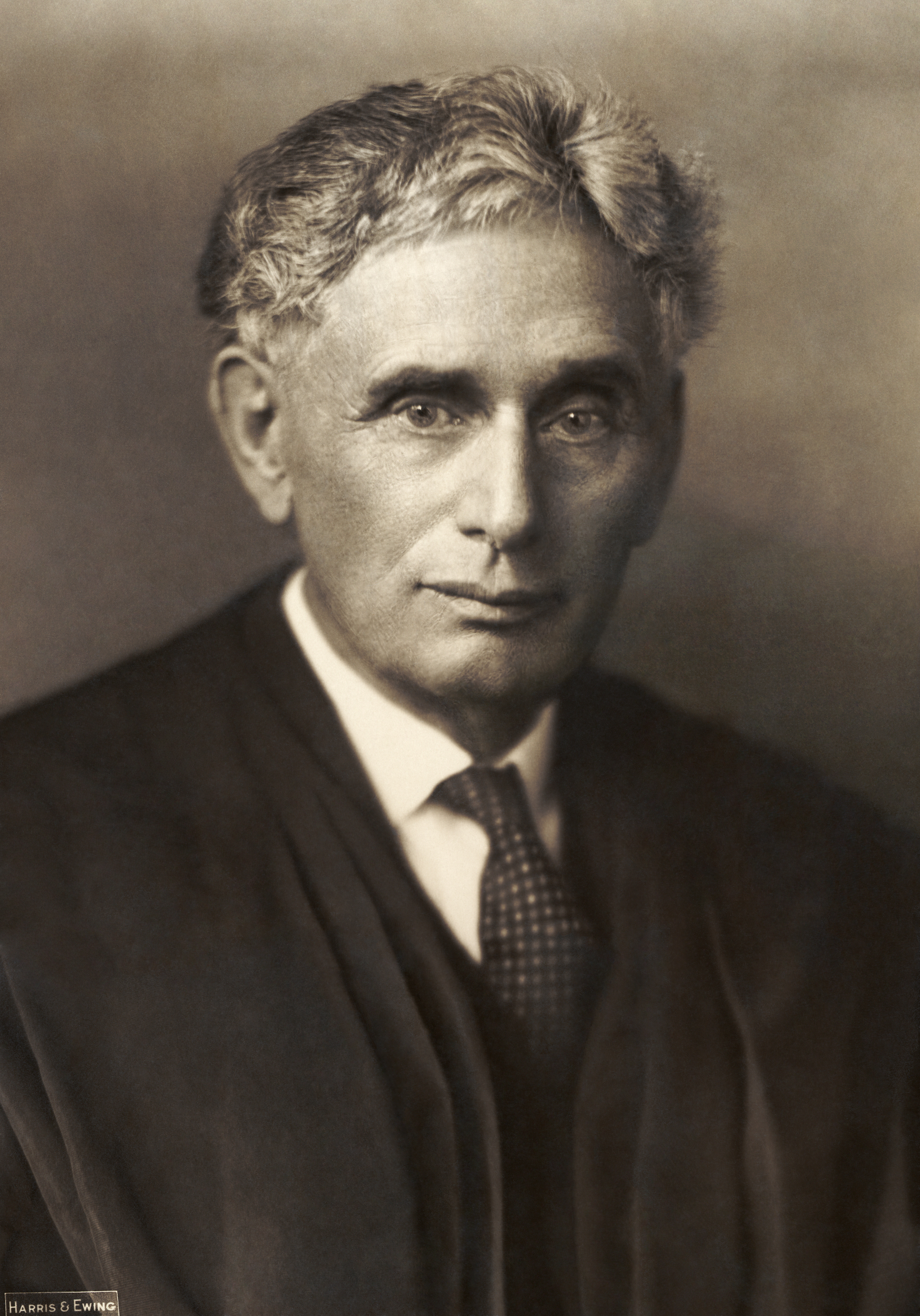
Justice Brandeis

Justice Brandeis delivered the opinion for a unanimous Court, reversing the Third Circuit. The first sentence of the opinion telegraphed the result: " The question for decision is whether the owner of a process patent may by suit for contributory infringement suppress competition in the sale of unpatented material to be used in practicing the process."

Brandeis recognized that Barber did not grant licenses on the process subject to a condition that the licensee buy bit3em from Barber. " But it adopts a method of doing the business which is the practical equivalent of granting a written license with a condition that the patented method may be practiced only with emulsion purchased from it. . . . Thus, the sole purpose to which the patent is put is thereby to suppress competition in the production and sale of staple unpatented material for this use in road building.

The case was settled by Carbice, irrespective of the absence of a formal tie-in condition: "That the patent did not confer upon the Barber Company the right to be free from competition in supplying unpatented material to be used in practicing the invention was settled by the rule declared in the Carbice case."

Barber argued that Carbice and Motion Picture Patents were inapplicable "because it has not entered into any contract or agreement aimed at expansion of the patent monopoly" while in those cases:

the attempt to secure the "partial monopoly of an unpatented material, outside of and apart from the patent monopoly" was made by contract or notice, whereas the Barber Company has made no attempt, "by contract, notice or otherwise, to expand its patent monopoly by limitations, or to reserve or create any monopoly in emulsion outside of, and apart from, its patent monopoly," that "its customers for emulsion have no more than the unconditional license to use implied by law and are under no restriction," and that neither the defendant nor its customers "has any relation with the patent owner."

The Court said, "The distinction upon which the Barber Company . . rests is without legal significance," because "every use of a patent as a means of obtaining a limited monopoly of unpatented material is prohibited. . . . It applies whatever the nature of the device by which the owner of the patent seeks to effect such unauthorized extension of the monopoly."

== Subsequent developments ==
=== La Fera Greco case ===
In Barber Asphalt Co. v. La Fera Grecco Contracting Co., the Third Circuit held that when Barber sold bituminous emulsion to purchasers for a royalty of 2 cents per gallon over the market price, and gave the purchaser a right to use the patented process, while requiring the users of bituminous emulsion purchased from other sources to pay a royalty of 1 cent per square yard of concrete surface over which the bituminous emulsion is spread, the sales practice puts such a burden upon the user of bituminous emulsion purchased from other sources as to prevent free competition. The theory was thatr it was impossible for customers to equalize the royalty of 2 cents per gallon paid by the purchasers from Barber and that required for the use of the patented process by those who purchased the bituminous emulsion elsewhere; this was because a gallon of the bituminous emulsion might be spread over a surface varying from 5 to 20 square yards in practicing the patented process. Consequently, if the product purchased from others were used economically by the purchaser so as to cover 15 or 20 years of concrete, the license fee required would be so great that he could not afford to purchase the product from anyone other than the patentee. The Third Circuit said: "The contractor who does not purchase his emulsions through the Johnson-March Thompson middleman channel is faced with the economic anomaly that upon spreading his emulsions sparingly his cost is increased; thickly, the cost is reduced."

=== Dehydrators case ===
In Dehydrators, Ltd. v. Petrolite Corp., the owner of a process patent supplied an unpatented product called Tret-O-Lite Turkey Red Oil at a single price that combined a charge for the use of the process and a charge for the product supplied. The patentee ran afoul of the Leitch case, even though it had publicly offered to any persons who preferred to procure the unpatented product elsewhere the alternative of an unrestricted license to practice the process, upon payment of a royalty based on the difference between the cost of the unpatented product on the open market and the patentee's sale price for the same unpatented product. The court said:

If the appellee had been more interested in promoting or exploiting its patent than in selling its Tret-O-Lite it would have been a very simple matter to fix a royalty fee of so many cents per gallon whether purchased from the appellee or from outsiders. Indeed, no other course on the part of a patentee who is selling a commercial product to use in the patented process he owns would seem to quite meet the claim that the practice of combining the price of a royalty and of the product in the same unit without separation tends to promote a monopoly in the product if the patent monopoly is not waived.
