= Carbice Corp. v. American Patents Development Corp. =

- Supreme Court of the United States

Argued January 16 – January 19, 1931 Decided March 9, 1931
- Full case name: Carbice Corp. v. American Patents Development Corp.
- Citations: 283 U.S. 27 (more) 51 S. Ct. 334; 75 L. Ed. 819; 1931 U.S. LEXIS 123; 8 U.S.P.Q. 211

Case history
- Prior: Am. Patents Dev. Corp. v. Carbice Corp. of Am., 25 F.2d 730 (E.D.N.Y. 1928); reversed, 38 F.2d 62 (2d Cir. 1930); cert. granted, 281 U.S. 711 (1930).
- Subsequent: Rehearing granted, 283 U.S. 794 (1931); order entered, 283 U.S. 420 (1931).

Holding
- A patentee may not create conditional licenses holding that unpatented materials used in connection with the invention shall be purchased only from the licensor. The limited monopoly to make, use, and vend an article may not be expanded by limitations as to materials and supplies necessary to the operation of it.

Court membership
- Chief Justice Charles E. Hughes Associate Justices Oliver W. Holmes Jr. · Willis Van Devanter; James C. McReynolds · Louis Brandeis; George Sutherland · Pierce Butler; Harlan F. Stone · Owen Roberts

Case opinion
- Majority: Brandeis, joined by unanimous

Carbice Corp. v. American Patents Development Corp., 283 U.S. 27 (1931), is a decision of the United States Supreme Court extending the patent misuse doctrine against tie-ins to cases in which patents were used to tie the purchase of unpatented elements of patented combinations. The Court had previously held that it was unlawful to require the purchase of supplies as a condition of a patent license, where the supplies were not claimed as part of the patented combination.

== Background ==
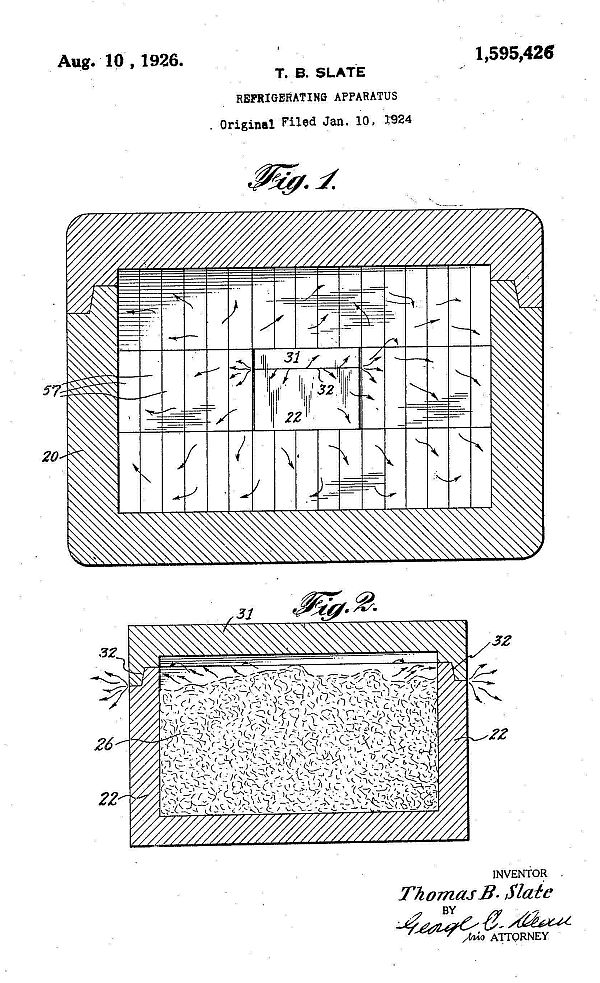
Cross-sectional drawings of inner and outer containers of device of U.S. Pat. No. 1,595,426

American Patents Development Corp. (APDC) held a patent for a dry ice transport enclosure (shipping container), in which a smaller container of dry ice was surrounded by a freezable material (such as ice cream) being refrigerated; this arrangement was contrary to the usual packaging practice of surrounding the material being refrigerated with regular ice. The patent was not on dry ice itself, which was well known as a refrigerant, nor on the container itself, but on the combination of the container and dry ice and the freezable material. A typical claim of the patent provided:

6. A transportation package consisting of a protective casing of insulating material having packed therein a quantity of frozen carbon dioxide in an insulating container and a quantity of freezable product in freezing proximity to said frozen carbon dioxide and the gas evaporated therefrom, arranged so that said frozen carbon dioxide is less accessible for exterior heat than said freezable products.

APDC licensed the patent exclusively to Dry Ice Corp. (DIC). DIC made and sold only dry ice. It designated other firms to make and sell the patented transportation devices (see diagram of box within a box). Each invoice for the dry ice that DIC sold had this notice:

The merchandise herein described is shipped upon the following condition: That DryIce shall not be used except in DryIce cabinets or other containers or apparatus provided or approved by the DryIce Corporation of America, and the DryIce Cabinets or other containers or apparatus provided or approved by the DryIce Corporation of America shall be refrigerated or used only with DryIce.

Carbice manufactured and sold dry ice to a Mr. Marchiony (and other persons) who combined the dry ice with containers he originally bought from a supplier approved by DIC, but then he reused the containers without the consent of DIC. APDC then sued Carbice, but that court dismissed the suit on the grounds that no infringement occurred because the dry ice was a perishable supply used in practicing the patent.

APDC appealed to the Second Circuit, which reversed the judgment of the district court. The Second Circuit said that the doctrine of the Motion Picture Patents case did not apply, because the tied product (the dry ice) was a claimed element of the patented combination. That made the case different from prior tie-in cases in which the tied product was an unpatented supply (such as ink or film) used together with the patented device. The Second Circuit said:

It is only unpatented materials which form no part of the patented machine which the Supreme Court held the purchaser of the machine may use at will. The solid carbon dioxide forms the most vital part of plaintiffs' patented package. Marchiony might legally use defendant's carbice in any way not covered by the patent in suit, but he could not manufacture the patented package without the plaintiffs' consent, a consent which they withheld, unless the vital ingredient of its manufacture was purchased from them. To extend the doctrine of the Motion Picture Case as defendant contends would completely destroy the monopoly of plaintiffs' patent.

Carbice then appealed to the Supreme Court.

== Ruling of Supreme Court ==
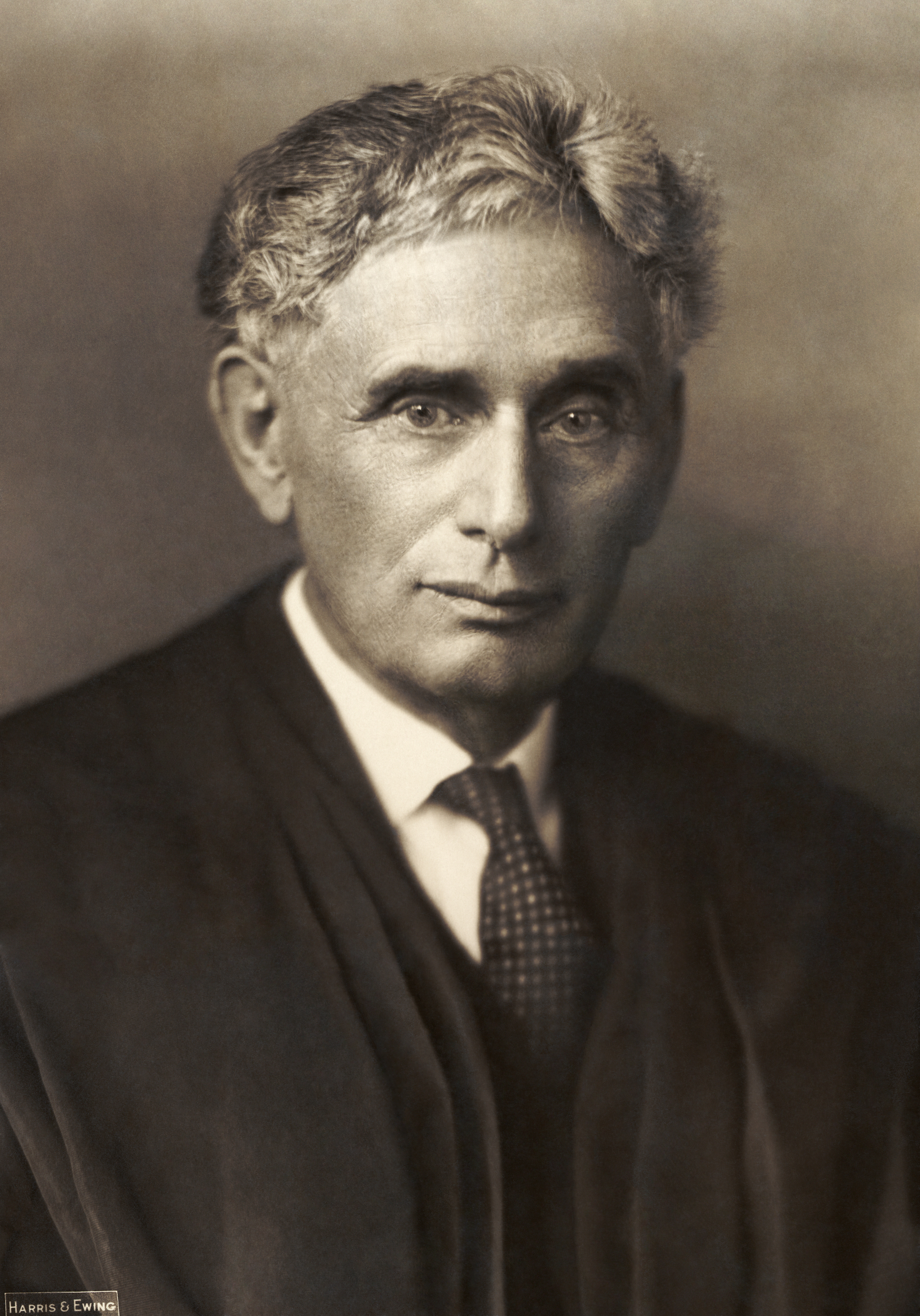
Justice Brandeis

Justice Brandeis wrote for a unanimous Court, reversing the Second Circuit and reinstating the judgment of the district court. After explaining the factual setting, the Court said: "Whether the transportation package described is a patentable invention we need not determine. For even if it is, no relief can be granted."

The Court cited Motion Picture Patents Co. v. Universal Film Mfg. Co. for the proposition that a patentee "may not exact as the condition of a license that unpatented materials used in connection with the invention shall be purchased only from the licensor, and if it does so, relief against one who supplies such unpatented materials will be denied. The limited monopoly to make, use, and vend an article may not be 'expanded by limitations as to materials and supplies necessary to the operation of it.' " The Court added, "The relief here sought is indistinguishable from that denied in the Motion Picture Case."

The Court rejected the patentee's attempt to distinguish Motion Picture Patents on the theory that the dry ice was a claimed element of the patented combination while earlier tie-in cases involved supplies that were not part of the patented invention. That was "without legal significance," because:

The Dry Ice Corporation has no right to be free from competition in the sale of solid carbon dioxide. Control over the supply of such unpatented material is beyond the scope of the patentee's monopoly, and this limitation, inherent in the patent grant, is not dependent upon the peculiar function or character of the unpatented material or on the way in which it is used.

== Further developments ==
Dry Ice Corporation (DIC) remained defiant despite the ruling of the Supreme Court. and it inaugurated "a campaign of intimidation against customers of the Carbice Corporation." DIC released

to the public press a statement that the validity of the patent as sustained by the Court of Appeals had not been disturbed; that the true patent monopoly had in no way been limited by this Court; that we had indicated that the proper way to enforce the patent monopoly is by directly suing those who use solid carbon dioxide in the patent combination without a license; and that the Dry Ice Corporation would immediately bring such a suit.

The Supreme Court ordered a re-argument and rehearing, limited to the question of the validity of the patent.

U.S. Patent No. 1,595,426, claims a refrigerating transportation package, consisting of an outer, insulating container, with the food substance to be refrigerated (e.g., ice cream) so packed therein as to surround a quantity of solid carbon dioxide in its separate insulating container, and thus to act, with the evolved gaseous dioxide, as a protection for the solid dioxide against exterior heat, the gas also serving to displace air from the food and refrigerate it. The alleged invention is thus "for the locational arrangement of materials within a container." The Court said that it did not need to determine whether "a locational arrangement within a structure can ever be patented," because this patent "lacks patentable invention and novelty":

Each of the elements—refrigerant, material to be refrigerated, and container—performs its function in a known way. Long prior to the date of the claimed invention, it was known that solid carbon dioxide, which has a temperature of 110 degrees below zero, is a refrigerant; that, when it "melts," it passes directly into a dry gas heavier than air, of like low temperature, which may serve as a refrigerant until its temperature rises to that of the outside air. It was known also that a frozen article—be it ice cream or solid carbon dioxide—will remain frozen longer if insulated, and that paper is an insulator. It was not invention to conclude that a cake of the solid dioxide wrapped in paper would remain solid longer if also surrounded by ice cream than if placed in more immediate proximity to the walls of the container, and thus to the outer air, or to conclude that the gas, being heavier than air, would, as generated, drive the air out of the container, and thus serve as an additional insulator. Moreover, the structural device of surrounding the refrigerant by the article to be refrigerated had been shown in the Mosler and Ladewig refrigerating butter-box . . . and in Rumpel's portable lunch box.

The invalidation of the patent thus terminated the "campaign of intimidation against customers" by threats of patent infringement suits.

== Commentary ==
Patent lawyers have been critical of the Carbice decision. For example, George Sirilla called it a pioneer example of the "Supreme Court's conspicuous anti-patent bent."
