= May 1931 =

Month of 1931

<<	May 1931					>>
Su	Mo	Tu	We	Th	Fr	Sa
					1	2
3	4	5	6	7	8	9
10	11	12	13	14	15	16
17	18	19	20	21	22	23
24	25	26	27	28	29	30
31

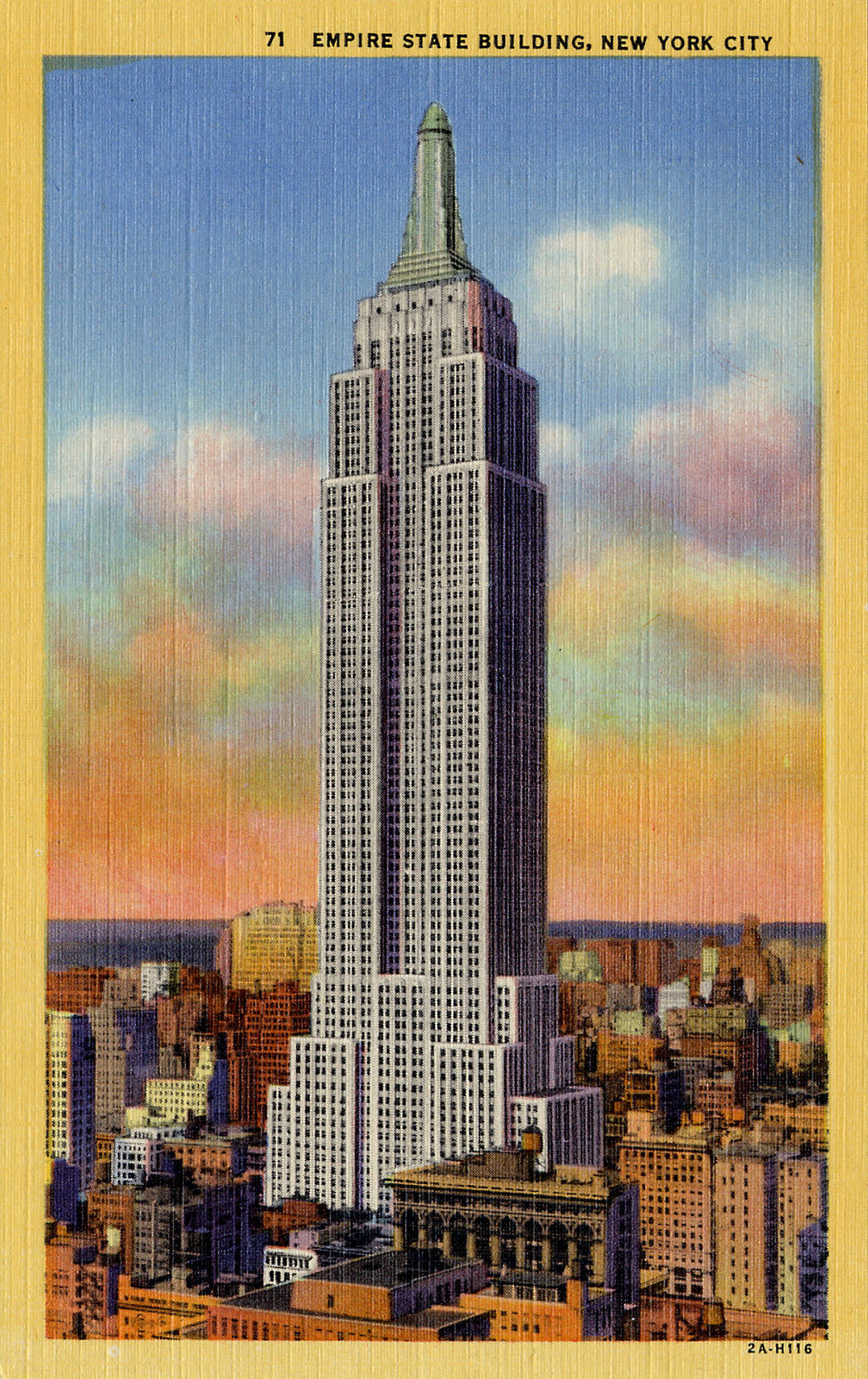
May 1, 1931: The 102-story tall Empire State Building, tallest in the world, opens in New York City

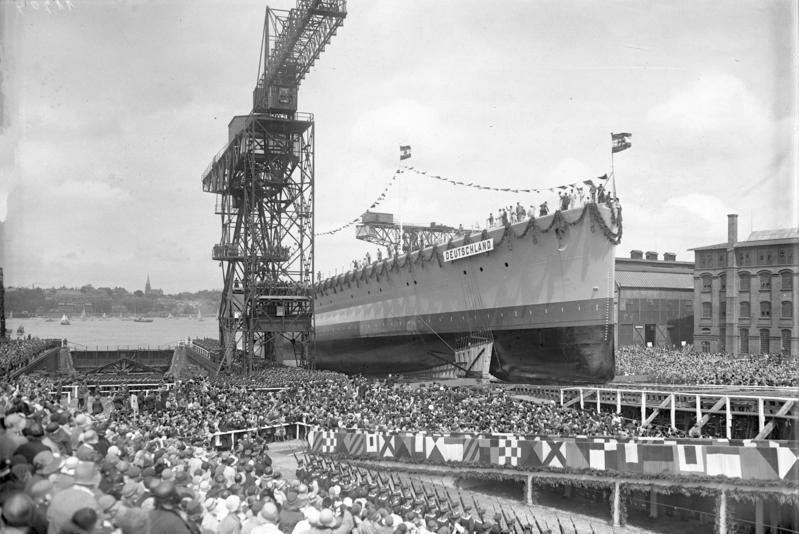
May 19, 1931: German luxury ocean liner Deutschland accidentally launched early from Kiel

The following events occurred in May 1931:

== Friday, May 1, 1931 ==
- The Empire State Building, the tallest building in the world, opened in New York City. At 11:30 a.m., President Hoover pressed a button in the White House that turned on the lights of all 102 stories.
- The comedy film The Millionaire starring George Arliss was released.
- The Florence Court of Appeal settles the Bruneri-Canella case,confirming the sentence of first instance. The "Collegno Amnesiac " is now officially the typographer and convicted Mario Bruneri and not Professor Giulio Canella.
- Born: Maya Belenkaya, Soviet figure skater, in Leningrad

== Saturday, May 2, 1931 ==
- A mock air raid was conducted over Toulon, France. Although the military maneuvers were called off after two hours due to bad weather, it sufficiently demonstrated to military experts that the important naval base would have been reduced to ruins by a fleet of 150 bombers had the attack been real.
- Died: George Fisher Baker, 91, American banker and philanthropist

== Sunday, May 3, 1931 ==
- In elections in Schaumburg-Lippe, the Social Democrats remained the largest party with 44.6% of the vote, but the Nazi Party came in second with 26.9%.
- Club Français defeated SO Montpellier 3–0 in the Coupe de France Final.
- J. Wellington Wimpy made his first appearance in the Thimble Theatre comic strip on May 3, 1931.
- Born:
  - Edith Bruck, Hungarian-Italian writer, Holocaust survivor, in Budapest.
  - Aldo Rossi, Italian architect and designer, in Milan (d. 2007)

== Monday, May 4, 1931 ==
- Mustafa Kemal was re-elected President of Turkey by the National Assembly.
- The United States Treasury estimated its budget deficit for 1930–31 at about $903 million.
- The Jewish Party, a splinter faction of the Union of Romanian Jews, was founded in Romania.
- Born: Richard Williams, jazz trumpeter, in Galveston, Texas (d. 1985)

== Tuesday, May 5, 1931 ==
- The Battle of Evarts took place in the U.S. in Harlan County, Kentucky, as two county sheriff's office deputies, one miner and another man were killed in a gun battle between striking miners and strikebreakers. The battle was one of a series of violent coal mining-related incidents in the region known as the Harlan County War.

== Wednesday, May 6, 1931 ==
- The Paris Colonial Exposition opened in France.
- The Soviet Union and Lithuania renewed their non-aggression pact that had been signed in 1926.
- Born: Willie Mays, American baseball player and inductee into the Baseball Hall of Fame; in Westfield, Alabama (d. 2024)

== Thursday, May 7, 1931 ==
- A force of 325 National Guardsmen were dispatched to Harlan County, Kentucky, by that U.S. state's Governor, under orders to "protect those who behave themselves and take charge of those who do not."
- Born:
  - Teresa Brewer, American pop music singer; in Toledo, Ohio (d. 2007)
  - Siddika Kabir, Bangladeshi nutritionist, cookbook author and cooking show television host; in Dhaka, Bengal province, British India (d. 2012)

== Friday, May 8, 1931 ==
- In the Weimar Republic of Germany, prosecution of Adolf Hitler by Hans Litten for complicity in manslaughter committed by members of the Sturmabteilung at the Tanzpalast Eden ("Eden Dance Palace") in Berlin in 1930 was dismissed.
- The Spanish provisional government decreed that religious instruction was no longer compulsory in schools.

== Saturday, May 9, 1931 ==
- The thoroughbred racehorse Mate won the Preakness Stakes.
- A huge building exposition, at 32 acres in size one of the largest ever held, opened in Berlin.

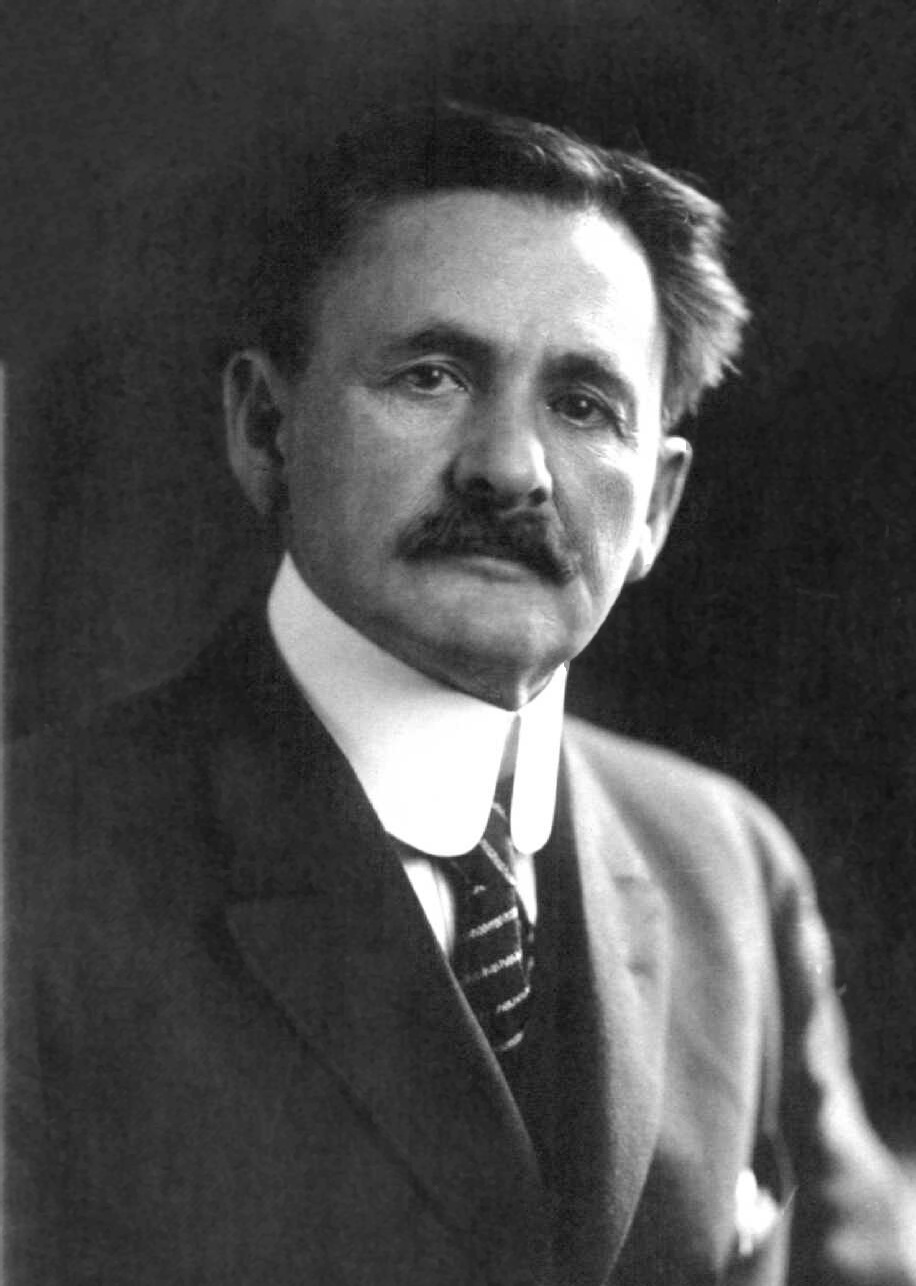
Michelson

- Died: Albert A. Michelson, 78, American physicist and 1907 Nobel laureate

== Sunday, May 10, 1931 ==
- Rioting broke out between monarchists and republicans in Madrid.
- Hermann Göring met with Benito Mussolini in Rome.
- Born:
  - Ichirō Nagai, Japanese anime voice actor, in Ikeda, Osaka (d. 2014)
  - Ettore Scola, Italian screenwriter and film director, in Trevico (d. 2016)

== Monday, May 11, 1931 ==
- The Creditanstalt Bank in Vienna failed, leading to a national currency crisis as investors began pulling their funds from Austrian banks and moving them to other countries.
- Four Roman Catholic convents were burned during the night by anticlerical rioters in Madrid.
- The Fritz Lang-directed film M premiered in Berlin.

== Tuesday, May 12, 1931 ==
- The Civil Guard was called into Madrid to stop the burning of convents.
- Dead: Eugène Ysaÿe, Belgian violinist (72)

== Wednesday, May 13, 1931 ==
- Paul Doumer was elected President of France by the French National Assembly.
- The International Olympic Committee voted to award the 1936 Summer Olympics to Berlin.
- Born:
  - Jim Jones, American cult leader who guided the mass suicide and murder of hundreds of his followers and their families in Guyana in 1978; in Randolph County, Indiana (d. 1978)
  - Jiří Petr, agroscientist and university professor, in Hradec Králové, Czechoslovakia (d. 2014)
  - Giulio Brogi, Italian actor, in Venice (d. 2019)

== Thursday, May 14, 1931 ==
- The Bank of England's lending rate was cut to 2.5%, its lowest rate in 22 years.

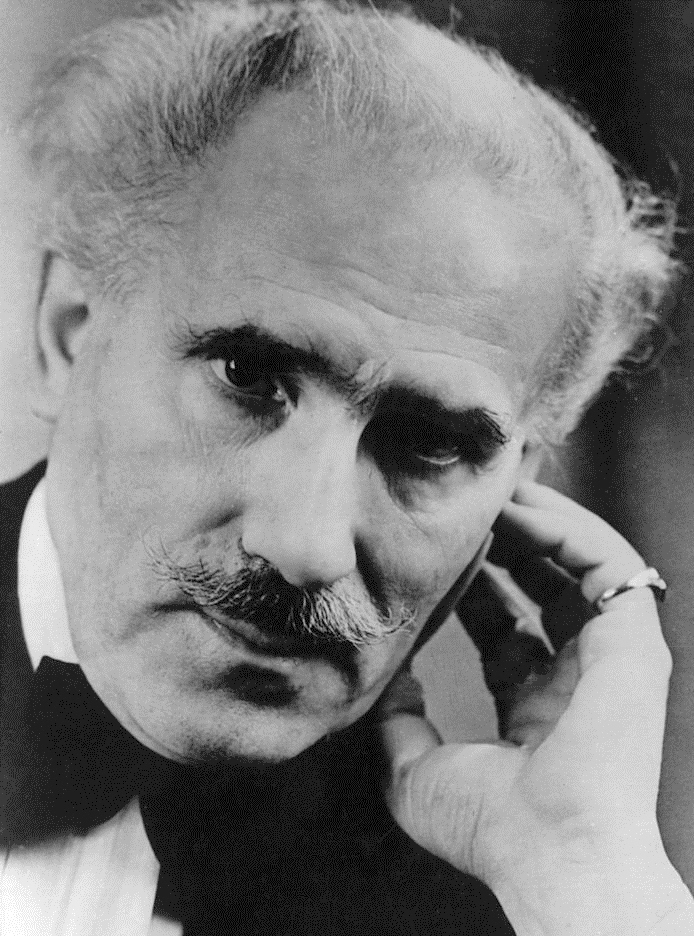
Toscanini

- In Bologna, the conductor Arturo Toscanini was assaulted by a Fascist youth for refusing to play Giovinezza at the beginning of a concert devoted to the 75th birthday of Giuseppe Martucci. Toscanini escaped into a car and returned to his hotel; the concert was postponed.
- Born: Alvin Lucier, American composer, in Nashua, New Hampshire (d. 2021)
- Died: David Belasco, 77, American Broadway impresario, theater owner and playwright

== Friday, May 15, 1931 ==
- Pope Pius XI issued the encyclical Quadragesimo anno.
- The Mahatma Gandhi announced he would attend the second Round Table Conference on Indian independence in London.
- Born:
  - Joseph A. Califano Jr., U.S. Secretary of Health, Education and Welfare from 1977 to 1979; in Brooklyn
  - Ken Venturi, American professional golfer, 1964 U.S. Open winner; in San Francisco (d. 2013)
  - Rosetta Loy, Italian writer, in Rome (d.2022)

== Saturday, May 16, 1931 ==
- Twenty Grand won the Kentucky Derby.
- Albert Einstein delivered a lecture at Rhodes House in Oxford, at which the blackboard was saved.
- Born:
  - Jack Dodson, U.S. television actor known for The Andy Griffith Show and Mayberry R.F.D.; in Pittsburgh (d. 1994)
  - Vujadin Boškov, Serbian football trainer, in Begrade (d. 2014).
- Died: Emiliano Figueroa, 64, ex-president of Chile, died in a car accident.

== Sunday, May 17, 1931 ==
- The Nazi Party won Landtag elections in Oldenburg with 37.2% of the vote. It was the first time the Nazis became the largest party in a Landtag.
- Born: Marshall Applewhite, American cult leader who led the 1997 mass suicide of his followers; in Spur, Texas (d. 1997)
- Died: Timothy Cole, 78, American wood engraver

== Monday, May 18, 1931 ==
- The United States Supreme Court decided Stromberg v. California, overturning a California court decision convicting a 19-year-old communist of breaking a state law against displaying a red flag.
- The U.S. Supreme Court decided Burnet v. Logan.
- Born:
  - Don Martin, American cartoonist for MAD magazine; in Paterson, New Jersey (d. 2000)
  - Robert Morse, American stage, film and TV actor, Tony Award and Emmy Award winner; in Newton, Massachusetts (d. 2022)
  - Corrado Ferlaino, SSC Napoli president, in Naples

== Tuesday, May 19, 1931 ==
- The German cruiser Deutschland was launched from Kiel. It accidentally slid into the water ahead of schedule before President Hindenburg had a chance to smash a bottle of champagne against its prow.
- Joseph Stalin announced the second five-year plan for the Soviet economy.
- Born: Éric Tappy, Swiss operatic tenor, in Lausanne (d. 2024)
- Died: Ralph Barton, 39, American caricaturist, committed suicide

== Wednesday, May 20, 1931 ==
- A report by International Labour Office Director General Albert Thomas was publicized, estimating that 20 million people were out of work around the world, double the numbers of one year ago.
- Fascist authorities confiscated the passport of Arturo Toscanini and essentially placed him under house arrest.
- Born: Ken Boyer, U.S. baseball player, 1964 National League MVP; in Liberty, Missouri (d. 1982)

== Thursday, May 21, 1931 ==
- Peder Kolstad became Prime Minister of Norway.
- The horror-fantasy radio series The Witch's Tale first aired on New York's WOR.
- Died: Charlie Poole, 39, American country musician, died of a heart attack

== Friday, May 22, 1931 ==
- The Spanish provisional government granted equal freedom to all religions.

== Saturday, May 23, 1931 ==
- Commemorating the fortieth anniversary of the encyclical Rerum novarum, Pope Pius XI published a lengthy message in L'Osservatore Romano calling the modern business world cruel and corrupting of the working class.
- The University of Oxford awarded Albert Einstein an honorary doctorate.
- The Whipsnade Zoo opened in Bedfordshire, England.
- Born:
  - Barbara Barrie, U.S. TV and film actress; in Chicago
  - Patience Cleveland, U.S. actress; in New York City (d. 2004)
- Died: Aldred Scott Warthin, 64, American pathologist
- Luigi Arcangeli (36), Italian car racer, in Monza, by an accident in testing for the 1931 Italian Grand Prix.

== Sunday, May 24, 1931 ==
- In São Paulo, composer Heitor Villa-Lobos presented the first of his Civic Exhortations, performed by 12,000 voices.
- The Alfa Romeo works team pairing of Giuseppe Campari and Tazio Nuvolari won the Italian Grand Prix.
- The Baltimore and Ohio Railroad (B&O) introduced the first completely air-conditioned passenger train, the Columbian, running between Washington and New York.
- Born:
  - Clint Ballard Jr., U.S. songwriter, in El Paso, Texas (d. 2008)
  - Ricky Romero, U.S. professional wrestler, in San Bernardino, California (d. 2006)

== Monday, May 25, 1931 ==
- The Royal British Legion voted to refer to November 11 as "Remembrance Day" rather than "Armistice Day".
- Born: Georgy Grechko, Soviet cosmonaut, in Leningrad (d. 2017)

== Tuesday, May 26, 1931 ==
- Serge Koussevitzky sent a telegram to the management of La Scala in Milan, explaining he would postpone his scheduled June performance there until the Italian government apologized to Arturo Toscanini over the events at Bologna.

== Wednesday, May 27, 1931 ==
- In Augsburg, Germany, Professor Auguste Piccard and physicist Paul Kipfer took off in an airtight ball attached to a hydrogen balloon in an attempt to be the first persons to reach the Earth's stratosphere. They attained an altitude of 15,606 m (51,200 ft) and then landed in the Austrian Alps after more than eighteen hours in the air.
- Between 2,000 and 3,000 Japanese railway workers went on strike in protest against proposed salary reductions.

== Thursday, May 28, 1931 ==
- Three people were killed in fighting between Communists and Nazis in Hagen.
- Born:
  - Carroll Baker, U.S. actress, in Johnstown, Pennsylvania
  - Eric Von Schmidt, folk and blues musician, in Bridgeport, Connecticut (d. 2007)
  - Peter Westergaard, composer and music theorist, in Champaign, Illinois (d. 2019)
  - Gordon Willis, cinematographer, in Astoria, New York (d. 2014)

== Friday, May 29, 1931 ==
- Texas Guinan and her ensemble of entertainers were refused entry into France for failing to get a work permit before departing New York. "Hell! What have I done to be treated like this?" Guinan fumed. "I entertained at the front during the war on a permit signed by President Wilson. Why ain't I good enough to come here and sing now?"
- Died: Michele Schirru, 31, Italian-born American anarchist, was executed by a firing squad after being convicted of plotting to assassinate Benito Mussolini.

== Saturday, May 30, 1931 ==
- The Fascist government of Italy suspended the youth circles of Azione Cattolica.
- In Rome, the Special Court issues the sentence against the leaders of Giustizia e Libertà in Milan; Ernesto Rossi and Riccardo Bauer are sentenced to ten years in prison, Ferruccio Parri to confinement.
- Louis Schneider won the Indianapolis 500.
- William "Red" Hill went over Niagara Falls in a barrel for the third time. After going over, the barrel was stuck in a whirlpool for almost three hours until it floated free and Hill could be rescued by his son, William Jr.
- Born: John O'Brien, Irish Catholic priest, in Kilrush (d. 2008)

== Sunday, May 31, 1931 ==
- A crowd of 150,000 members of the German monarchist organization Der Stahlhelm hailed former Crown Prince Wilhelm during their twelfth annual convention in Breslau.
- Francesco Camusso wins the Giro d'Italia after the two favorites (Alfredo Binda and Learco Guerra) retire due to various accidents. For the first time in the history of the Giro, the leader of the race wore a pink jersey.
- Born:
  - John Robert Schrieffer, U.S. physicist and Nobel laureate; in Oak Park, Illinois (d. 2019)
  - Shirley Verrett, American mezzo-soprano opera singer; in New Orleans (d. 2010)
