= Twentieth Century Music Corp. v. Aiken =

- Supreme Court of the United States

Argued April 21, 1975 Decided June 17, 1975
- Full case name: Twentieth Century Music Corp. v. Aiken
- Docket no.: 74-452
- Citations: 422 U.S. 151 (more) 95 S. Ct. 2040; 45 L. Ed. 2d 84; 186 U.S.P.Q. (BNA) 65
- Argument: Oral argument

Case history
- Prior: Certiorari to the United States Court of Appeals for the Third Circuit

Holding
- Receiving a song over a radio signal does not constitute a "performance," and therefore does not infringe upon the exclusive right to perform the copyrighted work publicly for profit.

Court membership
- Chief Justice Warren E. Burger Associate Justices William O. Douglas · William J. Brennan Jr. Potter Stewart · Byron White; Thurgood Marshall · Harry Blackmun; Lewis F. Powell Jr. · William Rehnquist

Case opinions
- Majority: Stewart, joined by Brennan, White, Marshall, Powell, Rehnquist
- Concurrence: Blackmun
- Dissent: Burger, joined by Douglas

Laws applied
- 17 U.S.C. § 106
- This case overturned a previous ruling or rulings
- Buck v. Jewell-LaSalle Realty Co.

Twentieth Century Music Corp v. Aiken, 422 U.S. 151 (1975), was a United States Supreme Court case in which the court held that receiving a song over a radio signal does not constitute a "performance," and therefore does not infringe upon the exclusive right to perform the copyrighted work publicly for profit.

== Case summary ==
"George Aiken's Chicken" is a fast food restaurant in Pittsburgh, Pennsylvania, owned and operated by George Aiken. Food can be purchased and consumed inside of the store or ordered and taken out. Inside the store, radio station broadcasts are played over loud speakers that are audible to anyone in the restaurant. On March 11, 1972, two songs copyrighted by Twentieth Century Music Corp. were played over the radio and heard by customers in the restaurant. While the radio station broadcasting the songs was licensed by the American Society of Composers, Authors and Publishers (ASCAP) to play them, Aiken's establishment was not.

The petitioners of the case were Twentieth Century Music Corp., which owned the copyright to one of the songs, "The More I See You", and Mary Bourne, who owned the copyright to the other song, "Me and My Shadow". The petitioners claimed that Aiken's broadcast of their songs in his establishment violated their right to publicly perform their work for profit. While the United States District Court for the Western District of Pennsylvania initially sided with the petitioners and required that Aiken provide monetary compensation for the copyright infringement, in 1975 the United States Court of Appeals for the Third Circuit overturned the ruling, stating that the respondent did not infringe upon the petitioners' right under the Copyright Act "[t]o perform the copyrighted work publicly for profit" since the radio broadcast in the establishment was not equivalent to a "performance". A similar decision was made in earlier court cases such as Fortnightly Corp. v. United Artists in 1968 and Teleprompter Corp. v. Columbia Broadcasting in 1974.

Respondent did not infringe upon petitioners' exclusive right, under the Copyright Act, "[t]o perform the copyrighted work publicly for profit," since the radio reception did not constitute a "performance" of the copyrighted songs. Fortnightly Corp. v. United Artists, 392 U.S. 390; Teleprompter Corp. v. CBS, 415 U.S. 394.

== United States District Court for the Western District of Pennsylvania ==
The District Judge ruled that Aiken did violate the petitioners' exclusive right to publicly perform their work for profit, and Aiken was ordered to pay monetary compensation to the copyright owners.

== The United States Court of Appeals for the Third Circuit ==
The United States Court of Appeals for the Third Circuit overturned the previous ruling, stating that the petitioners' claims were already reviewed in Fortnightly Corp. v. United Artists, 392 U. S. 390, and Teleprompter Corp. v. CBS, 415 U.S. 394. It was decided that the radio reception did not constitute a performance of the copyrighted works.

== Implications ==
The immediate effect of our copyright law is to secure a fair return for an "author's" creative labor. But the ultimate aim is, by this incentive, to stimulate artistic creativity for the general public good.

— Potter Stewart, 422 U.S. 151, at 156.

The ruling in Twentieth Century Music Corp. v. Aiken holds with Congress' consistent interpretation of the Copyright Act. Congress was granted the power to create copyright law under the Constitution. According to the copyright legislation passed by Congress, it takes the interests of three main parties into consideration: authors, disseminators, and users. "Congress has repeatedly stated that the main purpose of the Copyright Act is the public good of use and access to works of art, even if such a public good comes at the expense of the author of the work."

In Twentieth Century Music v. Aiken, the Court held: "Creative work is to be encouraged and rewarded, but private motivation must ultimately serve the cause of promoting broad public availability of literature, music, and the other arts. The immediate effect of our copyright law is to serve a fair return for an "author's" creative labor. But the ultimate aim is, by this incentive, to stimulate artistic creativity for the general public good."

Twentieth Century Music Corp. v. Aiken establishes that the goal of limited monopoly privileges granted by the Copyright Act are meant to serve the public good not to benefit the owner of such copyright privileges. The goal of copyright is to encourage artistic creativity for the accessibility of such works to the public and therefore benefit of the public. Copyright is meant to serve as an incentive and encouragement for artists to produce more works. Amanda Webber reiterates: "The 'monopoly privileges' that Congress can authorize through the Copyright Clause are not meant to provide a private benefit to the author. 'The use of this limited monopoly [by the author]…is a means of obtaining the goal of copyright: to stimulate artistic creativity for public good.' This public good is achieved when artists are provided with the necessary incentive and encouragement to continue making creative works." Aiken establishes definite favor for the public rather than private domain in the interpretation of the Copyright Act of 1964 thereby contradicting a previous ruling of the Court in Buck v. Jewell-LaSalle Reality Co., 283 U.S. 191 (1931).

Grounds for overturning a precedent—Twentieth Century Music Corp. v. Aiken presents a direct contradiction to the Supreme Court decision in Buck v. Jewell-LaSalle Realty Co., which held that a hotel proprietor who made broadcast music available to his hotel guests did violate the Copyright Act of 1909. Due to this inconsistency, the Supreme Court called upon the legislature to clarify what constitutes a performance and what does not. Both majority and dissenting opinions expressed this sentiments involving the need for clarification by Congress on this issue.

However, instead of addressing the issue raised by Aiken, Congress danced around the issue once again. The amendment they passed made no distinctions. "But despite this advice, when it came time for the draftsmen actually to resolve the problem, it appears that they decided to avoid it instead. Section 110(5) of the Revision Act, which supposedly deals with the Aiken situation, reads as follows:

§110. Limitations on exclusive rights: Exemption of certain performances and displays.
Notwithstanding the provisions of section 106, the following are not infringements of copyright:
(5) communication of a transmission embodying a performance or display of a work by the public reception of the transmission on a single receiving apparatus of a kind of commonly used in private homes, unless—

- (A) a direct charge is made to see or hear the transmission; or
- (B) the transmission thus received is transmitted to the public.

When they asked whether this section would change the result in Aiken, reporters received different answers from the counsel for the Senate Subcommittee, the counsel for the House Subcommittee, and the Registrar of Copyrights, all certainly distinguished authorities on the subject."

== See also ==
- Copyright Act of 1976
- Fortnightly Corp. v. United Artists Television, Inc., 392 U.S. 390 (1968)
- Teleprompter Corp. v. Columbia Broadcasting, 415 U.S. 394 (1974)
- Buck v. Jewell-LaSalle Realty Co., 283 U.S. 191 (1931)
- Fox Film Corp. v. Doyal, 286 U.S. 123 (1932)
