= March 1931 =

Month of 1931

<<	March 1931					>>
Su	Mo	Tu	We	Th	Fr	Sa
1	2	3	4	5	6	7
8	9	10	11	12	13	14
15	16	17	18	19	20	21
22	23	24	25	26	27	28
29	30	31

The following events occurred in March 1931:

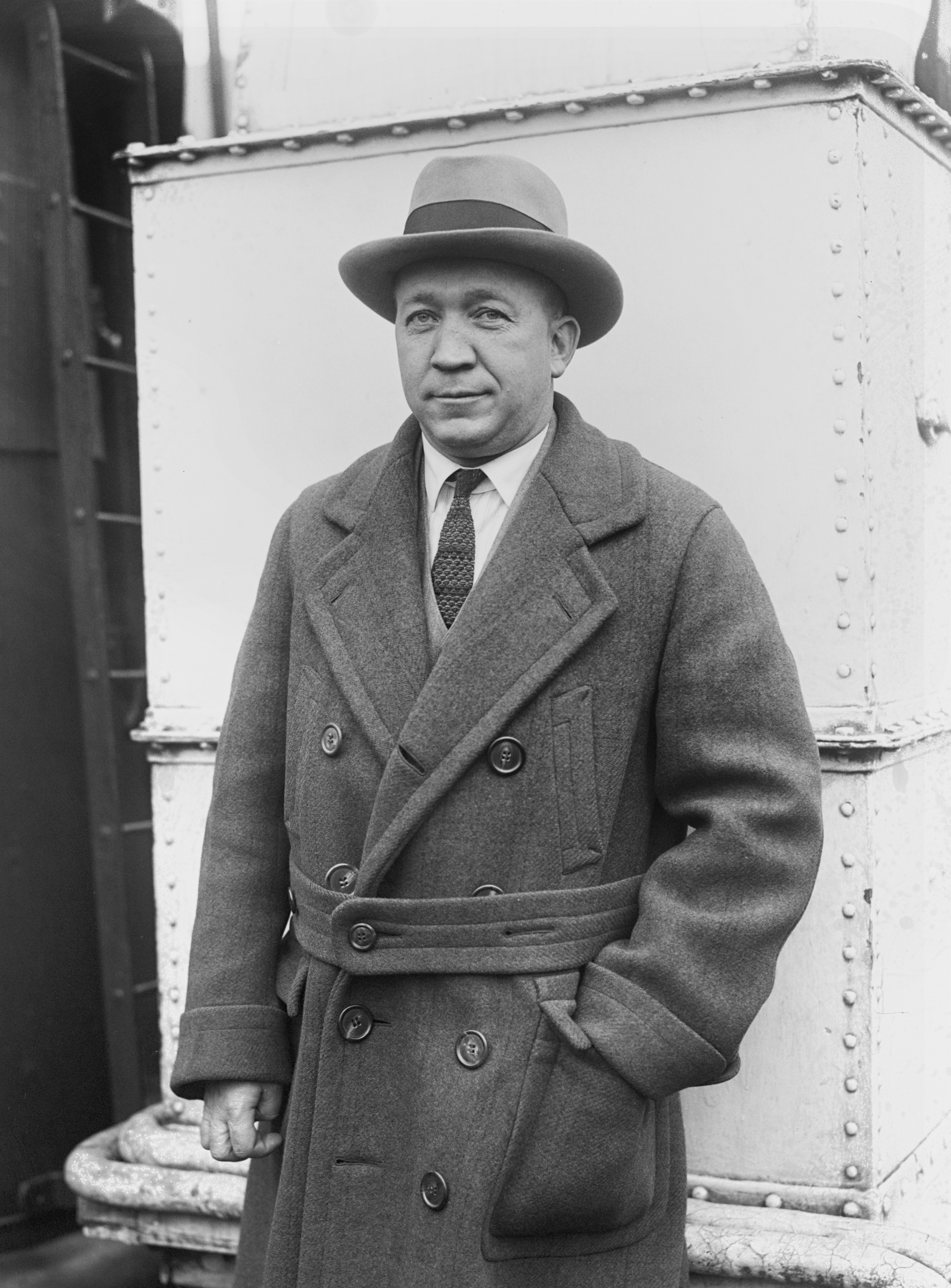
March 31, 1931: Legendary college football coach Knute Rockne of Notre Dame killed in airliner crash

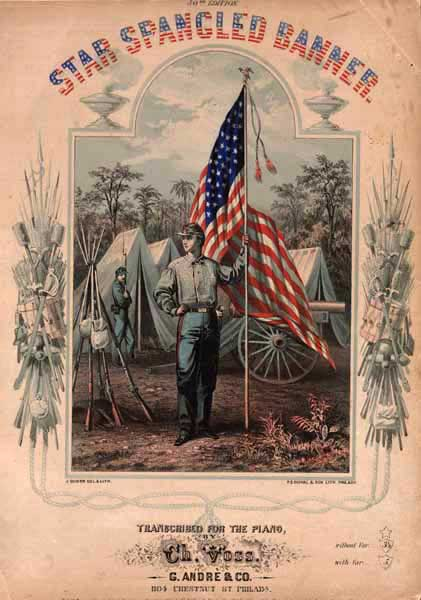
March 3, 1931: "The Star-Spangled Banner" officially designated as the United States national anthem

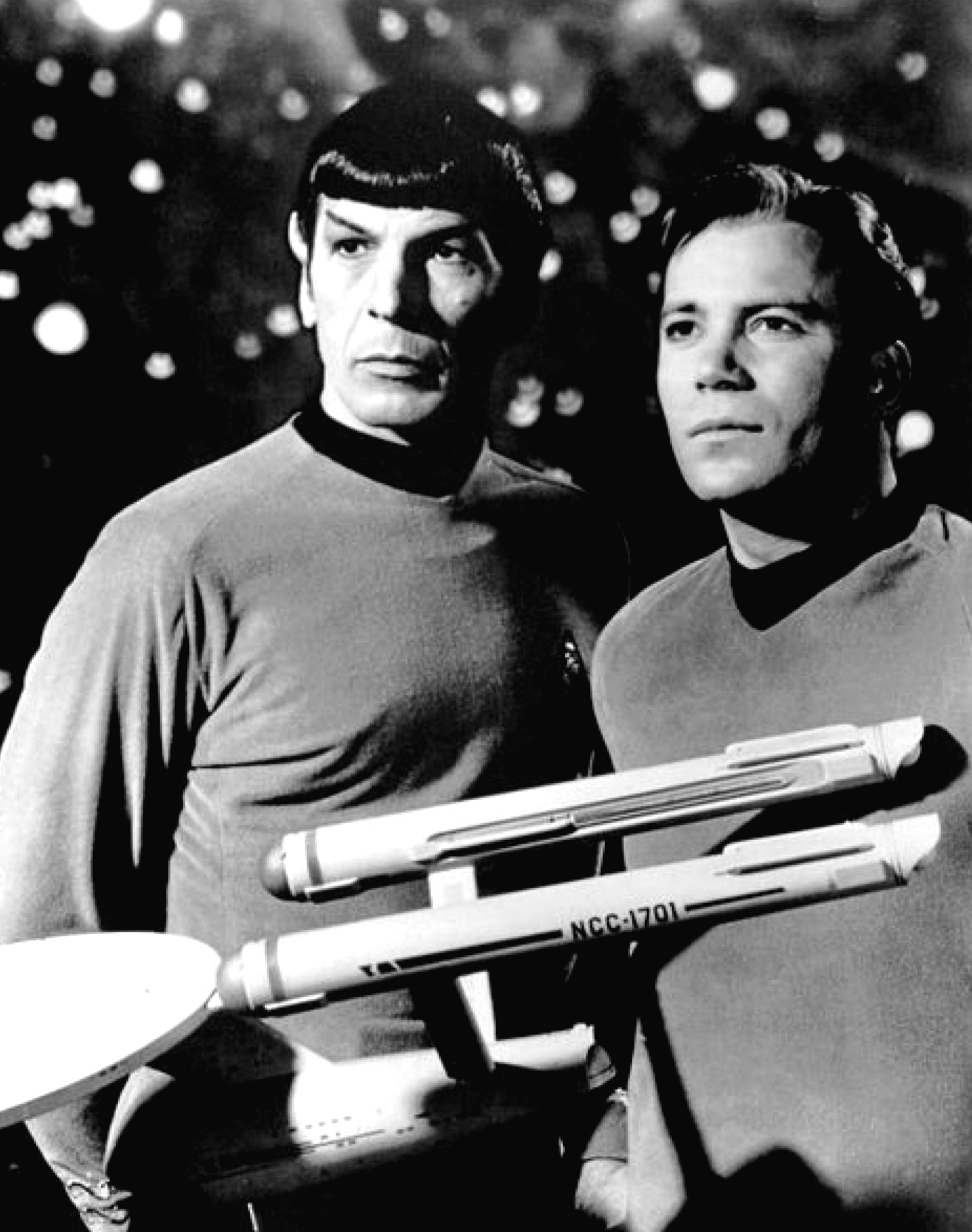
March 26, 1931; March 22, 1931, television co-stars Leonard Nimoy, William Shatner born

== Sunday, March 1, 1931 ==
- The Menshevik Trial began in Moscow.
- Pehr Evind Svinhufvud became President of Finland.
- The World Figure Skating Championships ended in Berlin. Karl Schäfer of Austria won the men's competition for the second straight year, while Sonja Henie of Norway won for the fifth consecutive year.
- Albert Speer joined the Nazi Party.
- Bridgestone, the well-known Japanese tire and rubber manufacturer, was founded in Kurume by Shojiro Ishibashi, whose last name was Japanese for "stone bridge".

== Monday, March 2, 1931 ==
- Sir Charles Trevelyan resigned as President of the Board of Education in Ramsay MacDonald's cabinet due to his education bill failing to pass.
- The Pearl S. Buck novel The Good Earth was published.
- Born:
  - Mikhail Gorbachev, General Secretary of the Communist Party of the Soviet Union from 1985 to 1991 and Nobel Peace Prize recipient for his reformation and the granting of civil liberties in the U.S.S.R. through his program of glasnost; in Privolnoye, Russian SFSR (d. 2022)

== Tuesday, March 3, 1931 ==
- U.S. President Herbert Hoover signed a congressional act making "The Star-Spangled Banner" the official national anthem of the United States.
- Cab Calloway and His Orchestra recorded the classic jazz song "Minnie the Moocher".
- Born: John Smith (stage name for Robert Van Orden), American film and TV actor known for the western Laramie, in Los Angeles (d. 1995)

== Wednesday, March 4, 1931 ==
- The Mahatma Gandhi and Viceroy of India Lord Irwin signed an agreement allowing citizens along the coast to make their own salt, all political prisoners were given amnesty and a second Round Table Conference on the matter of Indian independence would be held in London, in return for Gandhi calling an end to his civil disobedience campaign.
- Born:
  - Alice Rivlin, U.S. economist, director of the Congressional Budget Office (1975 to 1983) and the White House Office of Management and Budget (1994 to 1996); as Georgianna Alice Mitchell in Philadelphia (d. 2019)
  - Wally Bruner, American journalist and television host, in Ames, Iowa (d. 1997)
  - William H. Keeler, American Roman Catholic cardinal and Archbishop of Baltimore from 1989 to 2007; in San Antonio, Texas (d. 2017)

== Thursday, March 5, 1931 ==
- The Carl Zuckmayer satirical play The Captain of Köpenick premiered at the Deutsches Theater in Berlin.
- Died: Arthur Tooth, 91, Anglican clergyman who defied the Public Worship Regulation Act 1874

== Friday, March 6, 1931 ==
- Ruth Rowland Nichols set a new women's altitude record of 28,743 feet.
- The Lionel Barrymore-directed romance-drama film Ten Cents a Dance starring Barbara Stanwyck was released.

== Saturday, March 7, 1931 ==
- Eighteen people died in a collision between two river steamers on the Danube river near Belgrade during a storm.
- Three earthquakes shook a sparsely populated area in the Balkans along the borders of Yugoslavia, Bulgaria and Greece. Twenty villages suffered damage but only one person was confirmed dead.
- The Parliament House of Finland was officially inaugurated in Helsinki, Finland.
- Born: Atsuko Ikeda, Japanese princess who later renounced her privileges with the Imperial House of Japan in 1952 in order to marry a commoner; at the Tokyo Imperial Palace as the fourth daughter of Emperor Hirohito and the empress consort Nagako
- Died: Akseli Gallen-Kallela, 65, Finnish painter and illustrator of the Kalevala Finnish national epic

== Sunday, March 8, 1931 ==
- The day after initial quakes in the Balkans, the area was hit again with a much stronger, 6.9 magnitude earthquake. and 35 people were killed in Yugoslavia alone and thousands were left homeless.
- Born: Neil Postman, author, media theorist and cultural critic, in New York City (d. 2003)

== Monday, March 9, 1931 ==
- The sentencing in the Menshevik Trial was handed down. All the defendants were given prison terms of 5 to 10 years.
- The United States Supreme Court decided McBoyle v. United States.
- Charlie Chaplin visited Berlin.

== Tuesday, March 10, 1931 ==
- The earliest confirmed use of the word "supercalifragilisticexpialidocious" appeared in the Syracuse Daily Orange.
- Died: Joseph P. Cotton, 55, U.S. Under Secretary of State, from complications of surgery

== Wednesday, March 11, 1931 ==
- At least 300 people were killed when the Chinese cargo liner Ta Chi caught fire and sank in the Yangtze river near Wusong, while another 200 survived.
- David Samanez Ocampo became President of Peru.
- Born: Rupert Murdoch, Australian-born media tycoon and multi-billionaire; as Keith Rupert Murdoch in Melbourne
- Died: F. W. Murnau, 42, German film director, was killed in an auto accident while in Santa Barbara, California

== Thursday, March 12, 1931 ==
- Villages in Savoie near the French Alps were evacuated due to a massive landslide from the Bauges. The French village of Le Châtelard was saved when the landslide split into three great rivers of earth that bypassed it. The Interior Ministry sent an emergency fund to assist villagers left homeless by the landslide.
- Died: Adolfo Wildt, 63, Italian sculptor

== Friday, March 13, 1931 ==
- The German People's Party announced its withdrawal from the coalition government of Thuringia, saying they could no longer work with the Nazi Party as coalition partners due to constant attacks from them.

== Saturday, March 14, 1931 ==
- The Prince of Wales opened a British trade exposition in Buenos Aires. He addressed the crowd of 2,000 in Spanish and then pressed a gold button opening the exhibition's gates.
- A riot broke out at Joliet Prison, the maximum security penitentiary in the U.S. state of Illinois. One inmate was killed and four others, including a guard, were injured.
- Ernst Henning, a German Communist Party member of the Hamburg city council, was murdered by three Nazis.

== Sunday, March 15, 1931 ==
- The first radio broadcast from Ireland to the United States was made when Irish Free State President W. T. Cosgrave delivered a friendly address to the American people ahead of Saint Patrick's Day.
- The SS Viking exploded off the Horse Islands during the shooting of extra footage for the film The Viking, killing 27.
- Died: Varick Frissell, 27 or 28, American filmmaker (killed in the SS Viking explosion)

== Monday, March 16, 1931 ==
- Communists in Germany stormed Nazi Party headquarters in Altona, Hamburg and killed a Nazi in retaliation for the murder of Ernst Henning. The Nazi leadership officially condemned the Henning murder and, on the NSDAP Party's instruction, the three killers gave themselves up to police.

== Tuesday, March 17, 1931 ==
- Four bombs exploded in an open street near the Belgrade railway station where many government buildings stood. An army explosive expert called in to investigate a suspicious package after the first three went off was killed.
- Actor and filmmaker Jack Pickford was seriously injured in an automobile accident near San Bernardino, California.

== Wednesday, March 18, 1931 ==
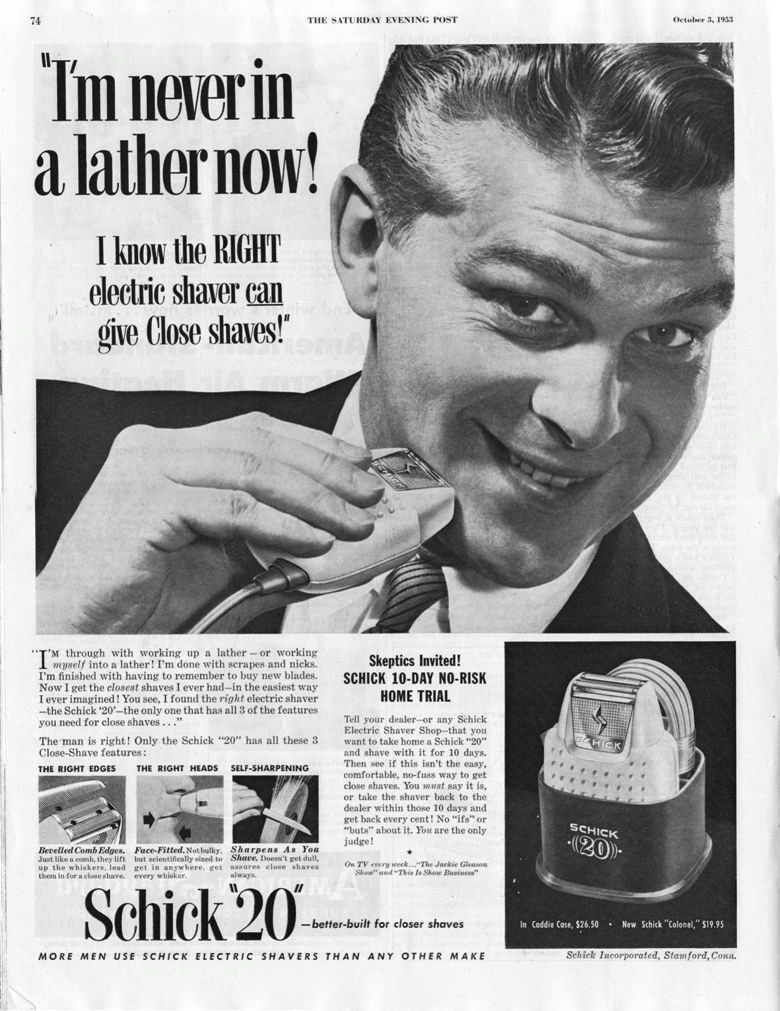
An early electric razor ad

- The first electric razors, manufactured by the Schick company, went on sale in New York.

== Thursday, March 19, 1931 ==
- The U.S. state of Nevada legalized gambling.

== Friday, March 20, 1931 ==
- Communists in Berlin held an illegal demonstration protesting the Ernst Henning murder until police dispersed them with clubs. In Magdeburg, thirty arrests were made in fighting between communists and Nazis.
- Chemist Maximilian Toch gave a speech at the American Museum of Natural History saying that after studying 30 Rembrandt paintings in the Metropolitan Museum of Art, he believed that 29 of them were forgeries.
- Born:
  - Hal Linden (stage name for Harold Lipshitz), American stage and TV actor, Tony Award and Emmy Award winner; in The Bronx, New York City
  - Karen Steele, American film and TV actress and model; in Honolulu (d. 1988)
- Died:
  - Hermann Müller, 54, Chancellor of Germany in 1920 and from 1928 to 1930 in the Weimar Republic
  - U.S. Navy Rear Admiral Joseph B. Murdock, 80, Commander-in-Chief of the U.S. Asiatic Fleet

== Saturday, March 21, 1931 ==
- The funeral of Ernst Henning was attended by 35,000 German Communists. Ernst Thälmann delivered the eulogy.
- A Catholic church decree appeared in L'Osservatore Romano condemning modern sex education and eugenics.
- Germany and Austria signed a customs pact.
- University of Cambridge won the 83rd Boat Race.

== Sunday, March 22, 1931 ==
- Britain warned Austria not to proceed with its customs agreement with Germany, saying it infringed on the 1922 reconstruction protocol in which Austria agreed to give equal tariff treatment to all countries.
- The Royal Scot express train derailed outside the Leighton Buzzard station, killing six passengers.
- Born:
  - Burton Richter, American physicist and 1976 Nobel laureate for his co-discovery of the J/psi meson; in Brooklyn (d. 2018)
  - William Shatner, Canadian-born U.S. TV and film actor best known for Star Trek; in Notre-Dame-de-Grâce, Quebec

== Monday, March 23, 1931 ==
- The Indian revolutionaries Bhagat Singh, Shivaram Rajguru and Sukhdev Thapar were hanged in Lahore for assassinating a British police commissioner in 1928 and throwing a bomb into the legislative assembly in 1929.
- King Alfonso XIII of Spain restored the country's constitutional guarantees ahead of municipal elections scheduled for April 12.

== Tuesday, March 24, 1931 ==
- A regiment of the Peruvian military mutinied in Lima and tried to attack the government palace, but the revolt was put down by the following morning.
- The Japanese House of Peers, for the second time, blocked legislation that would have given women the right to vote.
- Born: Connie Hines, American TV actress known for Mister Ed; in Dedham, Massachusetts (d. 2009)
- Died: Robert Edeson, 62, American stage and silent film actor

== Wednesday, March 25, 1931 ==
- The Scottsboro Boys case began in Alabama when nine black youths who were hoboing on a train were arrested and charged with rape.
- Born: Tom Wilson, American record producer, in Waco, Texas (d. 1978)
- Died: Ida B. Wells, 68, African-American journalist, editor and activist, co-founder of the NAACP

== Thursday, March 26, 1931 ==
- An international conference of 48 nations opened in Rome to discuss the problem of low grain prices. Many countries were displeased by the Soviet Union's practise of harvesting vast amounts of grain and then dumping the surplus on the world market.
- Swissair, the national airline for Switzerland, was founded as S.A. Suisse pour la Navigation Aérienne/Schweizerische Luftverkehr AG.
- Born: Leonard Nimoy, actor and director, in Boston (d. 2015)

== Friday, March 27, 1931 ==
- A Soviet delegate at the international wheat conference said that Russia would continue exporting as much surplus grain as it pleased and would listen to the proposals of other nations, but would make no commitment to accept them.
- Born: David Janssen, actor, in Naponee, Nebraska (d. 1980)
- Died:
  - Ernest Barnard, 56, president of major league baseball's American League since 1927 after succeeding Ban Johnson
  - Arnold Bennett, 63, English novelist

== Saturday, March 28, 1931 ==
- In an attempt to reduce political violence, Germany's President Paul von Hindenburg used Article 48 to pass an emergency decree curtailing freedoms of speech and assembly, as well as privacy rights.
- Died: Ban Johnson (Byron Bancroft Johnson), 66, American baseball executive and first president of the American League from 1901 to 1927, just hours after the death of his successor, Ernest Barnard

== Sunday, March 29, 1931 ==
- The Indian National Congress unanimously voted to accept nothing from the British Empire short of complete independence for India.
- Germany had its quietest Sunday in months following Hindenburg's decree of the previous day.
- Born:
  - Aleksei Gubarev, Soviet Russian cosmonaut on Soyuz 17 and Soyuz 28; in Gvardeitsi, Borsky District, Russian SFSR, Soviet Union (d. 2015)
  - Norman Tebbit, English politician and cabinet member, British Secretary of State for Employment 1981 to 1983; in Ponders End, Middlesex (d. 2025)

== Monday, March 30, 1931 ==
- Alfred Hugenberg bitterly attacked Germany's President Hindenburg's emergency decree, saying it was enforced only to prevent Der Stahlhelm from winning a referendum demanding the dissolution of the Prussian Landtag. The cabinet of Heinrich Brüning countered with a statement accusing the Nationalists of "seeking to undermine the public's confidence in President von Hindenburg", adding, "To demand a repeal of the decree is a personal attack on the president."
- At the Rome wheat conference, Austrian Agriculture Minister Engelbert Dollfuss blamed Prohibition in the United States for the world's agricultural problems, saying, "If the United States would drop Prohibition so that the American farmers could raise hops to make beer, then the strain of wheat crops would be relieved and the United States would drop out of the wheat exporting category to the relief of the entire world."

== Tuesday, March 31, 1931 ==
- At least 2,000 people were killed in an earthquake in Nicaragua centered on Managua.
- The British recording industry manufacturer Electric and Musical Industries (EMI Records) was founded as a merger of the Columbia Graphophone Company and the Gramophone Company.
- Died: Knute Rockne, 43, Norwegian-born American college football coach for the University of Notre Dame, was killed in a plane crash along with seven other people.
