= List of United States Supreme Court cases, volume 283 =

Supreme Court of the United States
- Interactive map of Supreme Court of the United States
- 38°53′26″N 77°00′16″W
- Established: March 4, 1789; 236 years ago
- Location: Washington, D.C.
- Coordinates: 38°53′26″N 77°00′16″W
- Composition method: Presidential nomination with Senate confirmation
- Authorised by: Constitution of the United States, Art. III, § 1
- Judge term length: life tenure, subject to impeachment and removal
- Number of positions: 9 (by statute)
- Website: supremecourt.gov

This is a list of cases reported in volume 283 of United States Reports, decided by the Supreme Court of the United States in 1931.

== Justices of the Supreme Court at the time of volume 283 U.S. ==
The Supreme Court is established by Article III, Section 1 of the Constitution of the United States, which says: "The judicial Power of the United States, shall be vested in one supreme Court . . .". The size of the Court is not specified; the Constitution leaves it to Congress to set the number of justices. Under the Judiciary Act of 1789 Congress originally fixed the number of justices at six (one chief justice and five associate justices). Since 1789, Congress has varied the size of the Court from six to seven, nine, ten, and back to nine justices (always including one chief justice).

When the cases in volume 283 were decided the Court comprised the following nine members:

| Portrait | Justice | Office | Home State | Succeeded | Date confirmed by the Senate (Vote) | Tenure on Supreme Court |
|---|---|---|---|---|---|---|
| | Charles Evans Hughes | Chief Justice | New York | William Howard Taft | February 13, 1930 (52–26) | February 24, 1930 – June 30, 1941 (Retired) |
| | Oliver Wendell Holmes Jr. | Associate Justice | Massachusetts | Horace Gray | December 4, 1902 (Acclamation) | December 8, 1902 – January 12, 1932 (Retired) |
| | Willis Van Devanter | Associate Justice | Wyoming | Edward Douglass White (as Associate Justice) | December 15, 1910 (Acclamation) | January 3, 1911 – June 2, 1937 (Retired) |
| | James Clark McReynolds | Associate Justice | Tennessee | Horace Harmon Lurton | August 29, 1914 (44–6) | October 12, 1914 – January 31, 1941 (Retired) |
| | Louis Brandeis | Associate Justice | Massachusetts | Joseph Rucker Lamar | June 1, 1916 (47–22) | June 5, 1916 – February 13, 1939 (Retired) |
| | George Sutherland | Associate Justice | Utah | John Hessin Clarke | September 5, 1922 (Acclamation) | October 2, 1922 – January 17, 1938 (Retired) |
| | Pierce Butler | Associate Justice | Minnesota | William R. Day | December 21, 1922 (61–8) | January 2, 1923 – November 16, 1939 (Died) |
| | Harlan F. Stone | Associate Justice | New York | Joseph McKenna | February 5, 1925 (71–6) | March 2, 1925 – July 2, 1941 (Continued as chief justice) |
| | Owen Roberts | Associate Justice | Pennsylvania | Edward Terry Sanford | May 20, 1930 (Acclamation) | June 2, 1930 – July 31, 1945 (Resigned) |

== Notable Cases in 283 U.S. ==
=== Stromberg v. California ===
Stromberg v. California, 283 U.S. 359 (1931), is a landmark decision of the Supreme Court in which the Court held that a California statute banning red flags was unconstitutional because it violated the First and Fourteenth Amendments to the United States Constitution. In the case, Yetta Stromberg was convicted for displaying a red flag daily in the youth camp for children at which she worked, and was charged under the California law. Chief Justice Charles Evans Hughes wrote for the seven-justice majority that the California statute was unconstitutional, and therefore Stromberg's conviction could not stand. This decision is considered a landmark in the history of First Amendment constitutional law, as it was one of the first cases in which the Court extended the Fourteenth Amendment to include a protection of the substance of the First Amendment, in this case symbolic speech or "expressive conduct", from state infringement.

=== Near v. Minnesota ex rel. Olson ===
Near v. Minnesota ex rel. Olson, 283 U.S. 697 (1931), is a landmark decision of the Supreme Court under which prior restraint on publication was found to violate freedom of the press as protected under the First Amendment. This principle was applied to free speech generally in later jurisprudence. The Court ruled that a Minnesota law that targeted publishers of "malicious" or "scandalous" newspapers violated the First Amendment to the United States Constitution (as applied through the Fourteenth Amendment). Legal scholar and columnist Anthony Lewis called Near the Court's "first great press case". It was later a key precedent in New York Times Co. v. United States (1971), in which the Court ruled against the Nixon administration's attempt to enjoin publication of the Pentagon Papers.

== Federal court system ==
Under the Judiciary Act of 1789 the federal court structure at the time comprised District Courts, which had general trial jurisdiction; Circuit Courts, which had mixed trial and appellate (from the US District Courts) jurisdiction; and the United States Supreme Court, which had appellate jurisdiction over the federal District and Circuit courts—and for certain issues over state courts. The Supreme Court also had limited original jurisdiction (i.e., in which cases could be filed directly with the Supreme Court without first having been heard by a lower federal or state court). There were one or more federal District Courts and/or Circuit Courts in each state, territory, or other geographical region.

The Judiciary Act of 1891 created the United States Courts of Appeals and reassigned the jurisdiction of most routine appeals from the district and circuit courts to these appellate courts. The Act created nine new courts that were originally known as the "United States Circuit Courts of Appeals." The new courts had jurisdiction over most appeals of lower court decisions. The Supreme Court could review either legal issues that a court of appeals certified or decisions of court of appeals by writ of certiorari. On January 1, 1912, the effective date of the Judicial Code of 1911, the old Circuit Courts were abolished, with their remaining trial court jurisdiction transferred to the U.S. District Courts.

== List of cases in volume 283 U.S. ==
| Case name | Citation | Opinion of the Court | Vote | Concurring opinion or statement | Dissenting opinion or statement | Procedural jurisdiction | Result |
|---|---|---|---|---|---|---|---|
| American Fruit Growers, Inc. v. Brogdex Company | 283 U.S. 1 (1931) | McReynolds | 9–0 | none | none | certiorari to the United States Court of Appeals for the Third Circuit (3d Cir.) | judgment reversed |
| Milliken v. United States | 283 U.S. 15 (1931) | Stone | 9–0 | none | none | certiorari to the United States Court of Claims (Ct. Cl.) | judgment affirmed |
| McBoyle v. United States | 283 U.S. 25 (1931) | Holmes | 9–0 | none | none | certiorari to the United States Court of Appeals for the Tenth Circuit (10th Cir.) | judgment reversed |
| Carbice Corporation of America v. American Patents Development Corporation I | 283 U.S. 27 (1931) | Brandeis | 9–0 | none | none | certiorari to the United States Court of Appeals for the Second Circuit (2d Cir.) | judgment reversed |
| Chesapeake and Ohio Railway Company v. United States | 283 U.S. 35 (1931) | Butler | 9–0 | none | none | appeal from the United States District Court for the Southern District of West Virginia (S.D.W. Va.) | judgment affirmed |
| United States v. Munson Steamship Line | 283 U.S. 43 (1931) | Hughes | 9–0 | none | none | certiorari to the United States Court of Appeals for the Fourth Circuit (4th Cir.) | judgment affirmed |
| Phillippides v. Day, Commissioner of Immigration | 283 U.S. 48 (1931) | Holmes | 9–0 | none | none | certiorari to the United States Court of Appeals for the Second Circuit (2d Cir.) | judgment affirmed |
| United States ex rel. Cateches v. Day, Commissioner of Immigration | 283 U.S. 51 (1931) | Holmes | 9–0 | none | none | certiorari to the United States Court of Appeals for the Second Circuit (2d Cir.) | judgment affirmed |
| Carr, Director of Immigration v. Zaja | 283 U.S. 52 (1931) | Holmes | 9–0 | none | none | certiorari to the United States Court of Appeals for the Ninth Circuit (9th Cir.) | judgment reversed |
| Flynn v. New York, New Haven and Hartford Railroad Company | 283 U.S. 53 (1931) | Holmes | 9–0 | none | none | certiorari to the Supreme Court of Errors of Connecticut (Conn.) | judgment affirmed |
| Storaasli v. Minnesota | 283 U.S. 57 (1931) | Roberts | 8-0[a] | none | none | appeal from the Minnesota Supreme Court (Minn.) | judgment affirmed |
| United States v. Utah | 283 U.S. 64 (1931) | Hughes | 9–0 | none | none | original | decree dismissing complaint of the United States so far as it relates to the beds of the portions of the Green, Grand, and Colorado Rivers found to be navigable |
| Herron v. Southern Pacific Company | 283 U.S. 91 (1931) | Hughes | 9–0 | none | none | certified questions from the United States Court of Appeals for the Ninth Circuit (9th Cir.) | certified questions answered |
| Columbus and Greenville Railway Company v. Miller, State Tax Collector ex rel. Mississippi Levee District | 283 U.S. 96 (1931) | Hughes | 9–0 | none | none | appeal from, and certiorari to, the Mississippi Supreme Court (Miss.) | judgment reversed |
| United States v. Wells | 283 U.S. 102 (1931) | Hughes | 8-0[b] | none | none | certiorari to the United States Court of Claims (Ct. Cl.) | judgment affirmed |
| Smith v. Springdale Amusement Park, Ltd. | 283 U.S. 121 (1931) | Hughes | 9–0 | none | none | certiorari to the United States Court of Appeals for the Sixth Circuit (6th Cir.) | decree affirmed |
| Hans Rees' Sons, Inc. v. North Carolina ex rel. Maxwell, Commissioner of Revenue | 283 U.S. 123 (1931) | Hughes | 9–0 | none | none | appeal from the North Carolina Supreme Court (N.C.) | judgment reversed, and cause remanded |
| Southern Railroad Company v. Hussey | 283 U.S. 136 (1931) | Holmes | 9–0 | none | none | certiorari to the United States Court of Appeals for the Eighth Circuit (8th Cir.) | judgment affirmed |
| Eckert v. Burnet, Commissioner of Internal Revenue | 283 U.S. 140 (1931) | Holmes | 9–0 | none | none | certiorari to the United States Court of Appeals for the Second Circuit (2d Cir.) | judgment affirmed |
| First National Bank of Chicago v. United States | 283 U.S. 142 (1931) | McReynolds | 9–0 | none | none | certiorari to the United States Court of Claims (Ct. Cl.) | judgment affirmed |
| Burnet, Commissioner of Internal Revenue v. Whitehouse | 283 U.S. 148 (1931) | McReynolds | 9–0 | none | none | certiorari to the United States Court of Appeals for the First Circuit (1st Cir.) | judgment affirmed |
| Farbwerke Vormals Meister Lucius und Bruning v. Chemical Foundation, Inc. | 283 U.S. 152 (1931) | McReynolds | 7-0[c] [d] | none | none | certiorari to the United States Court of Appeals for the Third Circuit (3d Cir.) | decree affirmed |
| Standard Oil Company (Indiana) v. United States I | 283 U.S. 163 (1931) | Brandeis | 8-0[d] | none | none | appeal from the United States District Court for the Northern District of Illinois (N.D. Ill.) | decree reversed |
| Interstate Transit, Inc. v. Lindsey | 283 U.S. 183 (1931) | Brandeis | 8–1 | none | McReynolds (without opinion) | appeal from the Tennessee Supreme Court (Tenn.) | judgment reversed |
| Buck v. Jewell-LaSalle Realty Co. | 283 U.S. 191 (1931) | Brandeis | 9–0 | none | none | certified question from the United States Court of Appeals for the Eighth Circuit (8th Cir.) | certified question answered |
| Jewell-LaSalle Realty Company v. Buck | 283 U.S. 202 (1931) | Brandeis | 9–0 | none | none | certified questions from the United States Court of Appeals for the Eighth Circuit (8th Cir.) | certified questions answered |
| Chesapeake and Ohio Railway Company v. Martin | 283 U.S. 209 (1931) | Sutherland | 9–0 | none | none | certiorari to the Supreme Court of Appeals of Virginia (Va.) | judgment reversed |
| Burnet, Commissioner of Internal Revenue v. Houston | 283 U.S. 223 (1931) | Sutherland | 9–0 | none | none | certiorari to the United States Court of Appeals for the Third Circuit (3d Cir.) | judgment reversed |
| Burnet, Commissioner of Internal Revenue v. Henry | 283 U.S. 229 (1931) | Sutherland | 9–0 | none | none | certiorari to the United States Court of Appeals for the Third Circuit (3d Cir.) | judgment reversed |
| Burnet, Commissioner of Internal Revenue v. Porter | 283 U.S. 230 (1931) | Sutherland | 9–0 | none | none | certiorari to the United States Court of Appeals for the Third Circuit (3d Cir.) | judgment reversed |
| Klein v. United States | 283 U.S. 231 (1931) | Sutherland | 9–0 | none | none | certiorari to the United States Court of Claims (Ct. Cl.) | judgment affirmed |
| Standard Oil Company (Indiana) v. United States II | 283 U.S. 235 (1931) | Sutherland | 9–0 | none | none | appeal from the United States District Court for the Northern District of Indiana (N.D. Ind.) | order of dismissal affirmed |
| New York Life Insurance Company v. Bowers | 283 U.S. 242 (1931) | Butler | 9–0 | none | none | certiorari to the United States Court of Appeals for the Second Circuit (2d Cir.) | judgments affirmed |
| Missouri Pacific Railroad Company v. Norwood, Attorney General of Arkansas | 283 U.S. 249 (1931) | Butler | 9–0 | none | none | appeal from the United States District Court for the Western District of Arkansas (W.D. Ark.) | decree affirmed |
| Bonwit Teller and Company v. United States | 283 U.S. 258 (1931) | Butler | 9–0 | none | none | certiorari to the United States Court of Claims (Ct. Cl.) | judgment reversed |
| Pagel v. MacLean | 283 U.S. 266 (1931) | Stone | 9–0 | none | none | certiorari to the Minnesota Supreme Court (Minn.) | judgment vacated, and cause remanded |
| United States v. Felt and Tarrant Manufacturing Company | 283 U.S. 269 (1931) | Stone | 9–0 | none | none | certiorari to the United States Court of Claims (Ct. Cl.) | judgment reversed |
| Maynard v. Elliott, Trustee in Bankruptcy | 283 U.S.273 (1931) | Stone | 9–0 | none | none | certiorari to the United States Court of Appeals for the Sixth Circuit (6th Cir.) | judgment reversed, and cause remanded |
| Group No. 1 Oil Corporation v. Bass | 283 U.S. 279 (1931) | Stone | 8-0[b] | none | none | certiorari to the United States Court of Appeals for the Fifth Circuit (5th Cir.) | judgment affirmed |
| Standard Marine Insurance Company v. Scottish Metropolitan Assurance Company | 283 U.S. 284 (1931) | Stone | 9–0 | none | none | certiorari to the United States Court of Appeals for the Sixth Circuit (6th Cir.) | judgment affirmed |
| Susquehanna Power Company v. State Tax Commission of Maryland I | 283 U.S. 291 (1931) | Stone | 9–0 | none | none | appeal from the Maryland Court of Appeals (Md.) | judgment affirmed |
| Susquehanna Power Company v. State Tax Commission of Maryland II | 283 U.S. 297 (1931) | Stone | 9–0 | none | none | appeal from the Maryland Court of Appeals (Md.) | dismissed |
| Burnet, Commissioner of Internal Revenue v. Thompson Oil and Gas Company | 283 U.S. 301 (1931) | Roberts | 9–0 | none | none | certiorari to the United States Court of Appeals for the Tenth Circuit (10th Cir.) | judgment reversed |
| Aldridge v. United States | 283 U.S. 308 (1931) | Hughes | 8–1 | none | McReynolds (opinion) | certiorari to the United States Court of Appeals for the District of Columbia (D.C. Cir.) | judgment reversed |
| Straton v. New | 283 U.S. 318 (1931) | Roberts | 9–0 | none | none | certified question from the United States Court of Appeals for the Fourth Circuit (4th Cir.) | certified question answered |
| State-Planters Bank and Trust Company v. Parker | 283 U.S. 332 (1931) | Roberts | 9–0 | none | none | certified question from the United States Court of Appeals for the Fourth Circuit (4th Cir.) | certificate dismissed |
| New Jersey v. New York | 283 U.S. 336 (1931) | Holmes | 7-0[b] [e] | none | none | original | various decrees regarding New York state diverting waters from the Delaware River |
| Smoot Sand and Gravel Corporation v. Washington Airport, Inc. | 283 U.S. 348 (1931) | Holmes | 8–1 | none | McReynolds (opinion) | certiorari to the United States Court of Appeals for the Fourth Circuit (4th Cir.) | decree reversed |
| Twin City Pipe Line Company v. Harding Glass Company | 283 U.S. 353 (1931) | Butler | 9–0 | none | none | certiorari to the United States Court of Appeals for the Eighth Circuit (8th Cir.) | decree reversed |
| Stromberg v. California | 283 U.S. 359 (1931) | Hughes | 7–2 | none | McReynolds (opinion); Butler (opinion) | appeal from the California District Court of Appeal (Cal. D. Ct. App.) | judgment reversed |
| Graniteville Manufacturing Company v. Query | 283 U.S. 376 (1931) | Hughes | 9–0 | none | none | appeal from the United States District Court for the Eastern District of South Carolina (E.D.S.C.) | order affirmed |
| Atchison, Topeka and Santa Fe Railway Company v. Railroad Commission of California | 283 U.S. 380 (1931) | Hughes | 8–1 | none | McReynolds (brief statement) | appeals from the California Supreme Court (Cal.) | judgments affirmed |
| Frank L. Young Company v. McNeal-Edwards Company | 283 U.S. 398 (1931) | Holmes | 9–0 | none | none | certiorari to the United States Court of Appeals for the First Circuit (1st Cir.) | judgment reversed |
| Atlantic Coast Line Railroad Company v. Powe | 283 U.S. 401 (1931) | Holmes | 9–0 | none | none | certiorari to the South Carolina Supreme Court (S.C.) | judgment reversed |
| Burnet, Commissioner of Internal Revenue v. Logan | 283 U.S. 404 (1931) | McReynolds | 9–0 | none | none | certiorari to the United States Court of Appeals for the Second Circuit (2d Cir.) | judgments affirmed |
| United States ex rel. McLennan v. Wilbur, Secretary of the Interior | 283 U.S. 414 (1931) | McReynolds | 9–0 | none | none | certiorari to the United States Court of Appeals for the District of Columbia (D.C. Cir.) | judgments affirmed |
| Carbice Corporation of America v. American Patents Development Company II | 283 U.S. 420 (1931) | Brandeis | 9–0 | none | none | certiorari to the United States Court of Appeals for the Second Circuit (2d Cir.) | judgment affirmed |
| Arizona v. California | 283 U.S. 423 (1931) | Brandeis | 8–1 | none | McReynolds (without opinion) | original | bill dismissed |
| East Ohio Gas Company v. Tax Commission of Ohio | 283 U.S. 465 (1931) | Butler | 9–0 | none | none | appeal from the United States District Court for the Southern District of Ohio (S.D. Ohio) | decree affirmed |
| New Jersey v. City of New York | 283 U.S. 473 (1931) | Butler | 9–0 | none | none | original | New Jersey entitled to injunction |
| Nash-Breyer Motor Company v. Burnet, Commissioner of Internal Revenue | 283 U.S. 483 (1931) | Stone | 9–0 | none | none | certiorari to the United States Court of Appeals for the Second Circuit (2d Cir.) | judgment affirmed |
| McCaughn, Collector of Internal Revenue v. Hershey Chocolate Company | 283 U.S. 488 (1931) | Stone | 9–0 | none | none | certiorari to the United States Court of Appeals for the Third Circuit (3d Cir.) | judgment reversed |
| Gasoline Products Company v. Champlin Refining Company | 283 U.S. 494 (1931) | Stone | 9–0 | none | none | certiorari to the United States Court of Appeals for the First Circuit (1st Cir.) | judgment reversed |
| Merchants Warehouse Company v. United States | 283 U.S. 501 (1931) | Stone | 8-0[b] | none | none | appeals from the United States District Court for the Eastern District of Pennsylvania (E.D. Pa.) | judgment affirmed |
| Custer v. McCutcheon | 283 U.S. 514 (1931) | Roberts | 9–0 | none | none | certiorari to the United States Court of Appeals for the Ninth Circuit (9th Cir.) | judgment reversed |
| Minneapolis, St. Paul and Sault Ste. Marie Railroad Company v. Moquin | 283 U.S. 520 (1931) | Roberts | 9–0 | none | none | certiorari to the Minnesota Supreme Court (Minn.) | judgment reversed, and cause remanded |
| Baldwin v. Iowa State Traveling Men's Association | 283 U.S. 522 (1931) | Roberts | 9–0 | none | none | certiorari to the United States Court of Appeals for the Eighth Circuit (8th Cir.) | judgment reversed, and cause remanded |
| State Board of Tax Commissioners of Indiana v. Jackson | 283 U.S. 527 (1931) | Roberts | 5–4 | none | Sutherland (opinion; with which VanDevanter, McReynolds, and Butler concurred) | appeal from the United States District Court for the Southern District of Indiana (S.D. Ind.) | judgment of the district court reversed, and cause remanded with instructions to dismiss the bill |
| Smith v. Cahoon | 283 U.S. 553 (1931) | Hughes | 9–0 | none | none | appeal from the Florida Supreme Court (Fla.) | judgment reversed, and cause remanded |
| Northport Power and Light Company v. Hartley, Governor of Washington | 283 U.S. 568 (1931) | Holmes | 9–0 | none | none | appeal from the United States District Court for the Western District of Washington (W.D. Wash.) | decree affirmed |
| Indian Motocycle Company v. United States | 283 U.S. 570 (1931) | VanDevanter | 7–2 | Holmes ("acquiesces in this decision") | Stone (opinion; with which Brandeis concurred) | certified question from the United States Court of Claims (Ct. Cl.) | certified question answered |
| Maas and Waldstein Company v. United States | 283 U.S. 583 (1931) | McReynolds | 9–0 | none | none | certiorari to the United States Court of Claims (Ct. Cl.) | judgment affirmed |
| Phillips v. Commissioner of Internal Revenue | 283 U.S. 589 (1931) | Brandeis | 9–0 | none | none | certiorari to the United States Court of Appeals for the Second Circuit (2d Cir.) | judgment affirmed |
| United States v. Macintosh | 283 U.S. 605 (1931) | Sutherland | 5–4 | none | Hughes (opinion; with which Holmes, Brandeis, and Stone concurred) | certiorari to the United States Court of Appeals for the Second Circuit (2d Cir.) | decree reversed |
| United States v. Bland | 283 U.S. 636 (1931) | Sutherland | 5–4 | none | Hughes (opinion; with which Holmes, Brandeis, and Stone concurred) | certiorari to the United States Court of Appeals for the Second Circuit (2d Cir.) | decree reversed |
| Fetters, U.S. Marshal v. United States ex rel. Cunningham | 283 U.S. 638 (1931) | Sutherland | 9–0 | none | none | certiorari to the United States Court of Appeals for the Third Circuit (3d Cir.) | judgment reversed, and cause remanded |
| Federal Trade Commission v. Raladam Company | 283 U.S. 643 (1931) | Sutherland | 9–0 | none | none | certiorari to the United States Court of Appeals for the Sixth Circuit (6th Cir.) | decree affirmed |
| Lewis-Simas-Jones Company v. Southern Pacific Company | 283 U.S. 654 (1931) | Butler | 9–0 | none | none | certiorari to the California Courts of Appeal (Cal. Dist. Ct. App.) | judgment reversed |
| DeForest Radio Company v. General Electric Company | 283 U.S. 664 (1931) | Stone | 9–0 | McReynolds (without opinion) | none | certiorari to the United States Court of Appeals for the Third Circuit (3d Cir.) | judgment reversed |
| Great Northern Railroad Company v. Delmar Company | 283 U.S. 686 (1931) | Roberts | 9–0 | none | none | certiorari to the United States Court of Appeals for the Eighth Circuit (8th Cir.) | judgment reversed, and cause remanded |
| Choteau v. Burnet, Commissioner of Internal Revenue | 283 U.S. 691 (1931) | Roberts | 9–0 | none | none | certiorari to the United States Court of Appeals for the Tenth Circuit (10th Cir.) | judgment affirmed |
| Near v. Minnesota ex rel. Olson | 283 U.S. 697 (1931) | Hughes | 5–4 | none | Butler (opinion; with which VanDevanter, McReynolds, and Sutherland concurred) | appeal from the Minnesota Supreme Court (Minn.) | judgment reversed |
| United States v. Equitable Trust Company of New York | 283 U.S. 738 (1931) | VanDevanter | 8-0[d] | none | none | certiorari to the United States Court of Appeals for the Second Circuit (2d Cir.) | decree modified and affirmed |
| Mott v. United States | 283 U.S. 747 (1931) | VanDevanter | 8-0[d] | none | none | certiorari to the United States Court of Appeals for the Tenth Circuit (10th Cir.) | decree affirmed |
| Halbert v. United States | 283 U.S. 753 (1931) | VanDevanter | 9–0 | none | none | certiorari to the United States Court of Appeals for the Ninth Circuit (9th Cir.) | decrees reversed |
| Georgia Public Service Commission v. United States | 283 U.S. 765 (1931) | Brandeis | 9–0 | none | none | appeal from the United States District Court for the Northern District of Georgia (N.D. Ga.) | judgment affirmed |
| Alabama v. United States | 283 U.S. 776 (1931) | Brandeis | 9–0 | none | none | appeal from the United States District Court for the Northern District of Alabama (N.D. Ala.) | decree affirmed |

[a] Butler took no part in the case
[b] Roberts took no part in the case
[c] Sutherland took no part in the case
[d] Stone took no part in the case
[e] Hughes took no part in the case
