= Burnet v. Logan =

- Supreme Court of the United States

Argued April 29, 1931 Decided May 18, 1931
- Full case name: Burnet, Commissioner of Internal Revenue v. Logan
- Citations: 283 U.S. 404 (more) 51 S. Ct. 550; 75 L. Ed. 1143

Case history
- Prior: 42 F.2d 193 (2d Cir. 1930)

Holding
- Prior to return of the amount at which the bequest was valued for federal estate tax purposes, the payments received by the legatee are not income.

Court membership
- Chief Justice Charles E. Hughes Associate Justices Oliver W. Holmes Jr. · Willis Van Devanter; James C. McReynolds · Louis Brandeis; George Sutherland · Pierce Butler; Harlan F. Stone · Owen Roberts

Case opinion
- Majority: McReynolds, joined by unanimous

Burnet v. Logan, 283 U.S. 404 (1931), was a case before the United States Supreme Court.

== Facts ==
Respondent, Mrs. Logan, before March 1913 and until March 11, 1916, owned shares in Andrews & Hitchcock Iron Company which in turn held 12% in Mahoning Ore & Steel Company which mined iron ore. Andrews & Hitchcock was later acquired by the Youngstown Sheet & Tube Company. Youngstown Sheet and Tube agreed to pay $2.2 million to the shareholders and 60 cents annually thereafter for each ton of ore apportioned to their shares. The respondent received this money over time but claimed that no income tax should arise until she received the total amount of the sale of her stock equal to its value on March 1, 1913. The Commissioner of Internal Revenue ruled that the obligation to pay 60 cents per ton had a fair market value of almost $2 million, and "that this value should be treated as so much cash and the sale of the stock regarded as a closed transaction with no profit in 1916". The Circuit Court of Appeals held that it was impossible to determine with certainty the fair market value of the agreement. Hence, the respondent was entitled to the return of her capital before she could be charged with any taxable income. Since her capital had not been returned, there was no taxable income.

== Holding ==
The U.S. Supreme Court agreed with the result reached by the Circuit Court of Appeals. When the profit of a transaction, if any, is realized, then the taxpayer will be required to respond. To determine whether there is a gain or loss, the initial capital at the beginning of the period in consideration must first be recovered. As annual payments from extracted ore are paid, they can be apportioned as the return of capital and later profit. The liability for income tax can be fairly determined without resorting to conjecture. The initial promise has no ascertainable fair market value, so the transaction was not closed. Mrs. Logan may never have recouped her initial investments from payments that were promised to her. Based on the facts, there is no way to fairly evaluate the promise of 60 cents a ton for an undisclosed portion of time. Therefore, income will only be included after all the bases have been recovered.

== Significance ==
The case presents an example of an open transaction case. Philadelphia Park Amusement Co. v. United States tells us that commonly, the value of what one receives will be the value of what one gives up in an exchange, or, more generally, in an arm's length transaction, the fair market values of the transaction will be equal. However, this is a situation where neither value is known, and so the valuation of the transaction is left open. Even though this is still considered a good law, it has fallen by the wayside and is rarely used, partially because it is often considered too generous because one is deemed to have no income while recovering. Generally, the open transaction doctrine will only be used in the rare occurrence where the fair market value of a contingent payment obligation cannot be reasonably ascertained.

== See also ==
- Youngstown Sheet & Tube Co. v. Sawyer (1952)
- List of United States Supreme Court cases, volume 283
