= Youngstown Sheet & Tube Co. v. Sawyer =

- Supreme Court of the United States

Argued May 12–13, 1952 Decided June 2, 1952
- Full case name: Youngstown Sheet & Tube Company, et al. v. Charles Sawyer, Secretary of Commerce
- Citations: 343 U.S. 579 (more) 72 S. Ct. 863; 96 L. Ed. 1153; 1952 U.S. LEXIS 2625; 21 Lab. Cas. (CCH) ¶ 67,008; 1952 Trade Cas. (CCH) ¶ 67,293; 62 Ohio L. Abs. 417; 47 Ohio Op. 430; 26 A.L.R.2d 1378; 30 L.R.R.M. 2172

Case history
- Prior: Injunction granted to plaintiffs, 103 F. Supp. 569 (D. D.C. 1952); injunctions stayed, 197 F.2d 582 (D.C. Cir. 1952); cert. granted, 343 U.S. 937 (1952).

Holding
- The President did not have the inherent authority to seize private property in the absence of either specifically enumerated authority under Article Two of the Constitution or statutory authority conferred on him by Congress.

Court membership
- Chief Justice Fred M. Vinson Associate Justices Hugo Black · Stanley F. Reed; Felix Frankfurter · William O. Douglas; Robert H. Jackson · Harold H. Burton; Tom C. Clark · Sherman Minton

Case opinions
- Majority: Black, joined by Frankfurter, Douglas, Jackson, Burton
- Concurrence: Frankfurter
- Concurrence: Douglas
- Concurrence: Jackson
- Concurrence: Burton
- Concurrence: Clark (in judgment)
- Dissent: Vinson, joined by Reed, Minton

Laws applied
- U.S. Const. art. II

Youngstown Sheet & Tube Co. v. Sawyer, 343 U.S. 579 (1952), also commonly referred to as the Steel Seizure Case or the Youngstown Steel case, is a landmark United States Supreme Court decision that limited the power of the president of the United States to seize private property. The case served as a check on the most far-reaching claims of executive power at the time and signaled the Court's increased willingness to intervene in political questions.

In the midst of the Korean War, the United Steel Workers of America threatened a strike for higher wages against the major steel producers in the United States. As President Harry S. Truman believed that a strike of any length would cause severe dislocations for defense contractors, Truman seized control of steel production facilities, keeping the current operating management of the companies in place to run the plants under federal direction. Though the steelworkers supported the move, the steel companies launched a legal challenge to the seizure on the grounds that the president lacked the power to seize private property without express authorization from Congress.

In his majority opinion, Associate Justice Hugo Black held that the president lacked the power to seize the steel mills in the absence of statutory authority conferred on him by Congress. Five other justices agreed with the outcome of the case but wrote concurring opinions; some of these justices argued that the president might have the power to seize property absent legislative authorization in more extreme circumstances. Justice Robert H. Jackson's concurring opinion laid out a framework of presidential power that would prove influential among legal scholars and others charged with assessing executive power. In his dissent, Chief Justice Fred Vinson argued that the president's action was necessary to preserve the status quo so that Congress could act in the future. Truman was stunned by the decision, but he immediately restored control of the steel mills to their owners.

== Historical background ==
During the Korean War, President Truman chose not to impose price controls of the kind used during World War II. Instead, his administration sought to curb inflation through the Wage Stabilization Board, which aimed to restrain wage and price increases while minimizing labor disputes. Those efforts failed, however, to avoid a threatened strike against all major steel producers by the United Steel Workers of America when the steel industry rejected the board's proposed wage increases unless they were allowed greater price increases than the government was prepared to approve.

The Truman administration believed a strike of any length would cause severe dislocations for defense contractors and the domestic economy as a whole. Unable to mediate the differences between the union and the industry, Truman decided to seize production facilities while he kept the current operating management of the companies in place to run the plants under federal direction.

Rather than seizing the plants, Truman might have invoked the national emergency provisions of the Taft–Hartley Act to prevent the union from striking. The administration rejected that option, however, both from a distaste for the Act, which had been passed over Truman's own veto five years earlier and because the administration saw the industry, rather than the union, as the cause of the crisis. Arthur Goldberg, General Counsel for the Steelworkers and the Congress of Industrial Organizations (CIO), argued that the President had the inherent power to seize the plants as well as the statutory authority under the Selective Service Act and the Defense Production Act.

The administration also rejected use of the statutory procedure provided under Section 18 of the Selective Service Act, which might have permitted seizure of the industry's steel plants on the ground that compliance with the procedure was too time-consuming and that its outcome too uncertain.

The steel industry, on the other hand, appears to have been taken by surprise, as it had apparently assumed, until shortly before Truman made his April 8, 1952 announcement, that he would take the less risky step of seeking a national emergency injunction under the Taft–Hartley Act instead. However, the industry was, as events showed, ready to act once Truman had announced the seizure by a national television and radio broadcast.

Public reaction to the announcement was largely negative. Many newspapers criticized both the order itself and Truman's justification of it, arguing that the President was claiming powers inconsistent with constitutional limits on executive authority. Newspaper editorials warned that the seizure represented an attempt to govern by executive decree and raised concerns about the concentration of power in the presidency. Facing mounting criticism, Truman subsequently emphasized that Congress retained the authority to reject his actions through legislation. Nonetheless, the administration continued to defend the seizure in court as an exercise of inherent executive authority.

== Legal background ==
The steel companies reacted immediately by sending attorneys to the home of Judge Walter M. Bastian of the D.C. District Court within 30 minutes of the end of the President's speech to ask for the issuance of a temporary restraining order. Judge Bastian scheduled a hearing for 11:30 the next day to hear arguments on the motion.

Because hearings on emergency motions came before a randomly-chosen judge, the hearing the next day was before Judge Alexander Holtzoff, a Truman appointee. Judge Holtzoff denied the motion on the ground that the balance of equities favored the government.

The case was assigned to David Andrew Pine, who heard the steel companies' motions for a preliminary injunction. While the government emphasized the President's constitutional authority to seize the mills, the companies initially focused on equitable relief and argued that the administration had bypassed procedures available under the Taft–Hartley Act. After counsel for Armco Steel Corporation challenged the government's authority to seize private property without congressional authorization, Pine invited the government to defend the constitutional basis for the seizure.

The Assistant Attorney General may have done more harm to the government's case than the steel companies had. Asked by Judge Pine for the source of the President's authority, he offered, "Sections 1, 2 and 3 of Article II of the Constitution and whatever inherent, implied or residual powers may flow therefrom." When the Court asked if the government took the position that "when the sovereign people adopted the Constitution ... it limited the powers of the Congress and limited the powers of the judiciary, but it did not limit the powers of the Executive", he assured Judge Pine that to be the case. He was, however, unable to name any cases that had held that the President had that power.

His presentation committed the Truman administration to an absolutist version of presidential power that went beyond the administration's own position. Truman's supporters in Congress first distanced themselves from the argument and then spread the message that Truman disavowed it as well. Finally, Truman issued a statement responding to a constituent's letter in which he acknowledged in very general terms the limitations that the Constitution imposed on his power to respond in a national emergency.

Two days later, Judge Pine issued an injunction, barring the government from continuing to hold the steel plants that it had seized. The Steelworkers began their strike within minutes of the announcement of the injunction. The government promptly appealed.

It first, however, formally requested for Judge Pine to stay his order and permit the government to resume control of the plants, ending the strike by the Steelworkers, but Judge Pine declined to do so. The government then applied for a stay in the D.C. Circuit. The Court, sitting en banc, granted the government's request for a stay by a 5–4 vote on April 30 and denied a motion for reconsideration by the steel companies that sought to amend the stay order to bar the government from increasing wages by the same margin the next day. The stay granted by the Court of Appeals was conditioned, however, on the government's filing of a petition for certiorari by May 2, 1952, and lasted only until the Supreme Court acted on that petition.

The government filed its petition for certiorari on May 2, only to discover that the steel companies had already filed one of their own. The government renewed its request for a stay.

In the meantime, the White House convened a meeting between the Steelworkers and the major steel companies on May 3. The talks made rapid progress and might have produced an agreement, but the announcement that the Supreme Court had granted certiorari and issued a stay that allowed the government to maintain possession of the steel mills but, coupled with an order barring any increase in wages during the pendency of the appeal, had removed any incentive for the steel companies to reach agreement on a new contract with the union.

== Proceedings ==
The Court set the matter for oral argument on May 12, 1952, less than ten days later. The government's brief opened with an attack on Judge Pine's application of equitable principles to the facts before him but devoted much of its 175 pages to the historical records of governmental seizure of private property in wartime from the Revolutionary War and the War of 1812 to Abraham Lincoln's Emancipation Proclamation and seizure of telegraph and railroad lines to the government's seizure of industrial properties in the First and the Second World Wars.

The steel industry's brief focused instead on the lack of statutory authority for this seizure and emphasized Congress's decision, when it had enacted the Taft–Hartley Act, to give the President the power to seek an injunction against strikes that might affect the national economy instead. It denied that the President had any power to seize private property without express legislative authorization and noted that Truman himself had asked for such legislative authority when the United Mine Workers of America went out on strike in 1950.

The Court set aside five hours for oral argument and allowed the Steelworkers and the railroad unions to speak as amicus curiae. Before an overflow crowd, John W. Davis argued for the steel companies that the President had no powers to make laws or, more particularly, to seize property without Congressional authorization. He explained away his own actions when he had defended the government's seizure of property while he had been US Solicitor General in Woodrow Wilson's administration and urged the justices to look beyond the transitory labor dispute before them to the constitutional principles at stake, closing with Thomas Jefferson's words, slightly misquoted: "In questions of power let no more be said of confidence in man but bind him down from mischief by the chains of the Constitution". Justice Frankfurter was the only Justice to interrupt Davis, with only one question, during his argument.

Solicitor General Philip B. Perlman had a rockier argument, as the Justices pressed him with questions on many of the points he made. Justice Jackson took pains to distinguish the facts concerning the seizure of the North American Aviation Company in 1941, which he had overseen as Attorney General at the time. Justice Douglas commented that if Perlman were correct as to the scope of the President's powers, there was no need for Congress. When Perlman attempted to close on a rousing note, reminding the Justices that it was during wartime, Justices Jackson and Frankfurter immediately contradicted him by noting that Congress had not declared war.

Goldberg, speaking for the Steelworkers, addressed whether the Taft–Hartley Act would have allowed for injunctive relief in those circumstances. The attorneys for the railroad brotherhoods, which were parties to a similar action coming up for review, addressed the President's inherent powers. Davis then gave his rebuttal by using only a few minutes of the hour that he had reserved.

Even despite the Court's evident lack of sympathy for the broad claims of inherent power made by the government, Truman and many other observers expected the Court to uphold his authority to act in the absence of express statutory authorization. Many commentators predicted that the Court would avoid the constitutional question, but others stressed the background that all of the Justices had in the New Deal and Fair Deal, when the powers of the Presidency had expanded greatly, and the past support of Justices such as Black, Reed, Frankfurter, and Douglas for the expansive application of the President's war powers.

As it turns out, most of those predictions were wrong. While Justice Burton harbored fears at one point that he might be the only Justice to vote against the government's position, he was encouraged by his private conversations with other Justices. In the end, the Court voted 6–3 to affirm the District Court's injunction to bar the President from seizing the steel plants.

== Majority opinion ==
Justice Black wrote for the majority opinion that was delivered exactly three weeks after the oral hearing on June 2. Writing for the Court, Justice Hugo Black concluded that the seizure lacked congressional authorization, noting that Congress had recently declined to grant the President such authority in the Taft–Hartley Act. The Court held that neither the President's authority as Commander-in-Chief nor the executive power vested by Article II justified the domestic seizure:

[T]he President's order does not direct that a congressional policy be executed in a manner prescribed by Congress—it directs that a presidential policy be executed in a manner prescribed by the President. ... The Constitution does not subject this lawmaking power of Congress to presidential or military supervision or control.

== Concurring opinions ==
=== William O. Douglas ===
Douglas took a similarly-absolutist approach to the President's assertion of inherent power to cope with a national emergency.

=== Felix Frankfurter ===
Frankfurter avoided the sweeping condemnation of the administration's claims that Black and Douglas had offered. He undertook a broader historical examination of legislation and executive practice involving industrial seizures to assess whether there was "long-continued acquiescence" by Congress to the Executive's construction of its constitutional powers. He concluded that the historical record reflected not congressional acquiescence but a "conscious choice" to withhold seizure authority, as evidenced by the Taft–Hartley Act.

=== Robert Jackson ===
Given that courts had little "useful and unambiguous authority applicable to concrete problems of executive power as they actually present themselves," Jackson's concurring opinion adopted a flexible approach. His tripartite framework would influence future Supreme Court cases on the president's powers and the relation between Congress and the presidency. He divided Presidential authority towards Congress into three categories (in descending order of legitimacy):

1. "When the President acts pursuant to an express or implied authorization of Congress, his authority is at its maximum, for it includes all that he possesses in his own right plus all that Congress can delegate.”
2. When the President acts "in absence of either a congressional grant or denial of authority, he can only rely upon his own independent powers, but there is a zone of twilight in which he and Congress may have concurrent authority, or in which its distribution is uncertain.”
3. "When the President takes measures incompatible with the expressed or implied will of Congress, his power is at its lowest ebb." The Court can sustain his actions “only by disabling the Congress from acting upon the subject.” A grant of such power would be "conclusive and preclusive."

Jackson warned against confusing the validity of executive power with the importance of the policy goals it serves. He explained that "[t]he opinions of judges, no less than executives and publicists, often suffer the infirmity of confusing the issue of a power’s validity with the cause it is invoked to promote, of confounding the permanent executive office with its temporary occupant." Jackson cautioned that focusing on temporary policy objectives could obscure the enduring constitutional balance of governmental powers.

=== Harold Hitz Burton ===
Burton likewise concluded that Congress, not the President, had the power to act in emergencies by having the exclusive power to pass legislation. He relied on the language and legislative history of the Taft–Hartley Act to find that Congress had not authorized seizure of plants involved in a labor dispute without express legislative authorization. He hedged, however, on whether the President might, in more extreme circumstances, have the authority to act.

=== Tom Campbell Clark ===
Justice Clark, who had been Truman's Attorney General for four years before Truman appointed him to the Court, rejected the absolute approach of Black and Douglas and concluded that the President had some inherent power to act in the case of grave and imperative national emergencies. Clark refused, however, to define the boundaries of that power; in his view, the fact that Congress had provided in the Taft–Hartley Act, the Selective Service Act, and the Defense Production Act for procedures that the executive could have used ended the discussion by barring the President from relying on any inherent powers that he might otherwise have to choose a solution that was other than the ones that Congress had allowed.

== Dissenting opinion ==
Chief Justice Vinson dissented, joined by Justices Reed and Minton. His opinion dealt at some length with the history of presidential seizures. In the oral presentation of his opinion, he went out of his way to make a sarcastic reference to the contrary positions that Jackson and Clark had taken when they were the Attorneys General for Franklin Roosevelt and Truman, respectively. Rejecting the view that Congress had limited the executive's authority to seize property in this case by providing for different procedures in the legislation it had enacted, Vinson's opinion still appeared to recognize Congress's primacy in enacting legislation by justifying the seizure in this case as necessary to preserve the status quo so that Congress could act in the future. However, he mocked arguments based on the Constitution's provision that allowed the President to recommend legislation, rather than make it himself, as "the messenger-boy concept of the Office".

== Aftermath ==
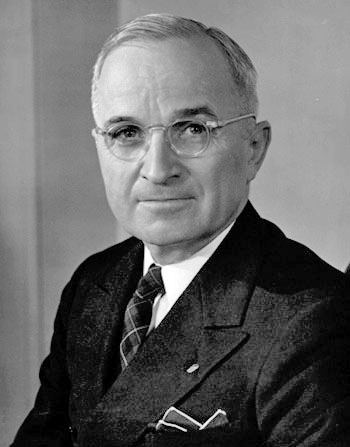
President Harry Truman

Within minutes of the Court's ruling, Truman ordered Commerce Secretary Charles Sawyer to return the steel mills to their owners; he did so immediately. The Steelworkers went out on strike again shortly thereafter. The strike lasted for more than 50 days until the President threatened to use the somewhat cumbersome procedures under the Selective Service Act to seize the mills.

Truman was stunned by the decision, which he continued to attack years later in his Memoirs. Justice Black was concerned enough that Truman would take the decision personally that he invited Truman and his fellow Justices to a party at his home. Truman, still smarting from the defeat, was mollified somewhat by Black's hospitality; as he told Black, "Hugo, I don't much care for your law, but, by golly, this bourbon is good."

The multiplicity of opinions made it difficult to determine just what the Court had decided as to whether and when the President had authority to act without Congressional authorization. That was largely the result of the fact that the administration had made a weak case. The evidence of an actual emergency was tenuous because of the substantial stockpiles of steel products in many sectors of the economy; the administration's case was made even weaker by overstating its position and offering incoherent arguments in the early phases of the litigation, which turned public opinion against it, and framed the public debate in the most simplistic terms.

The decision still has had a broad impact by representing a check on the most extreme claims of executive power at the time and the Court's assertion of its own role in intervening in political questions. The Court later did so in Baker v. Carr (1962) and Powell v. McCormack (1969) and also applied the Frankfurter–Jackson approach to analyzing Congress' legislative authorization of presidential action in invalidating efforts by the Nixon administration to plant wiretaps without prior judicial approval, and it cited the case more generally in support of its decision to permit litigation against the president to proceed in Clinton v. Jones (1997). The Supreme Court also relied on Youngstown in Medellín v. Texas (2008), in which President George W. Bush had pressured the state of Texas to review the murder conviction of a Mexican citizen, who had tortured and raped two teenage girls in 1993, by arguing that a 2004 decision by the International Court of Justice (ICJ) required law enforcement authorities to tell the accused of his right under the Vienna Convention to notify Mexican diplomats of his detention. In a 6–3 decision, the Court held that ICJ rulings were not enforceable in the United States and that Bush's actions were unconstitutional. Quoting Youngstown Sheet & Tube Chief Justice John Roberts concluded, "The president's authority to act, as with the exercise of any governmental power, 'must stem either from an act of Congress or from the Constitution itself'."

However, the Court drew back from some of the implications of its decision by refusing to rely on Youngstown as authority to review the failed challenges brought against the war in Vietnam and deferring to the executive branch's authority over foreign policy in cases such as Zemel v. Rusk (1965). The Court also cited Youngstown in the 2006 decision Hamdan v. Rumsfeld.

== Legacy ==
William Rehnquist, who was clerking for Justice Robert H. Jackson at the time, said the case "simply represents one of several important judicial milestones defining the limits of the power of a President of the United States to act on his own, without congressional authorization." Recognizing the Court's "commendable record of eschewing partisan politics", Rehnquist wondered whether the decision would have been the same if public opinion had not turned against the war. Judges, he said, "can no more escape being influenced by public opinion in the long run than can people working at other jobs."

Supreme Court Justice Amy Coney Barrett noted during her Supreme Court confirmation hearings that Justice Jackson's "familiar tripartite scheme" has since been called "the accepted framework for evaluating executive action" by the Supreme Court.

== See also ==
- Burnet v. Logan (1931): another Youngstown Steel case
- List of United States Supreme Court cases, volume 343
