= Buck v. Jewell-LaSalle Realty Co. =

- Supreme Court of the United States

Argued March 3–4, 1931 Decided April 13, 1931
- Full case name: Buck v. Jewell-LaSalle Realty Co.
- Citations: 283 U.S. 191 (more) 51 S. Ct. 410; 75 L. Ed. 971

Holding
- A hotel operator which provided headphones connected to a centrally controlled radio receiver was guilty of copyright infringement, because "reception of a radio broadcast and its translation into audible sound is not a mere audition of the original program. It is essentially a reproduction."

Court membership
- Chief Justice Charles E. Hughes Associate Justices Oliver W. Holmes Jr. · Willis Van Devanter; James C. McReynolds · Louis Brandeis; George Sutherland · Pierce Butler; Harlan F. Stone · Owen Roberts

Case opinion
- Majority: Brandeis, joined by a unanimous court
- Overruled by
- Twentieth Century Music Corp. v. Aiken

Buck v. Jewell-LaSalle Realty Co., 283 U.S. 191 (1931), was a United States Supreme Court case in which the Court held a hotel operator which provided headphones connected to a centrally controlled radio receiver was guilty of copyright infringement, because "reception of a radio broadcast and its translation into audible sound is not a mere audition of the original program. It is essentially a reproduction."
