= April 1931 =

Month of 1931

<<	April 1931					>>
Su	Mo	Tu	We	Th	Fr	Sa
			1	2	3	4
5	6	7	8	9	10	11
12	13	14	15	16	17	18
19	20	21	22	23	24	25
26	27	28	29	30

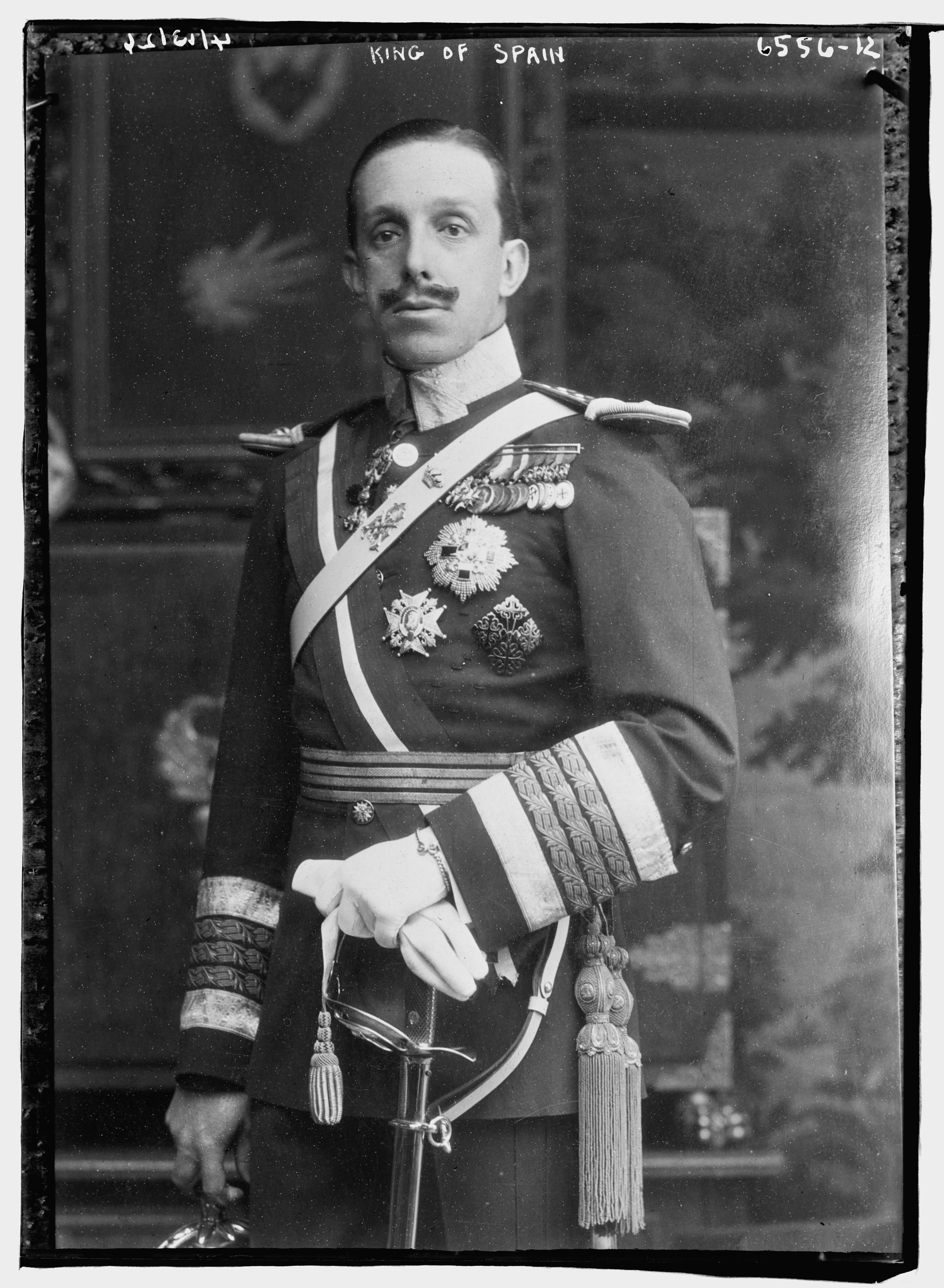
April 15, 1931: King Alfonso XIII of Spain quietly goes into exile

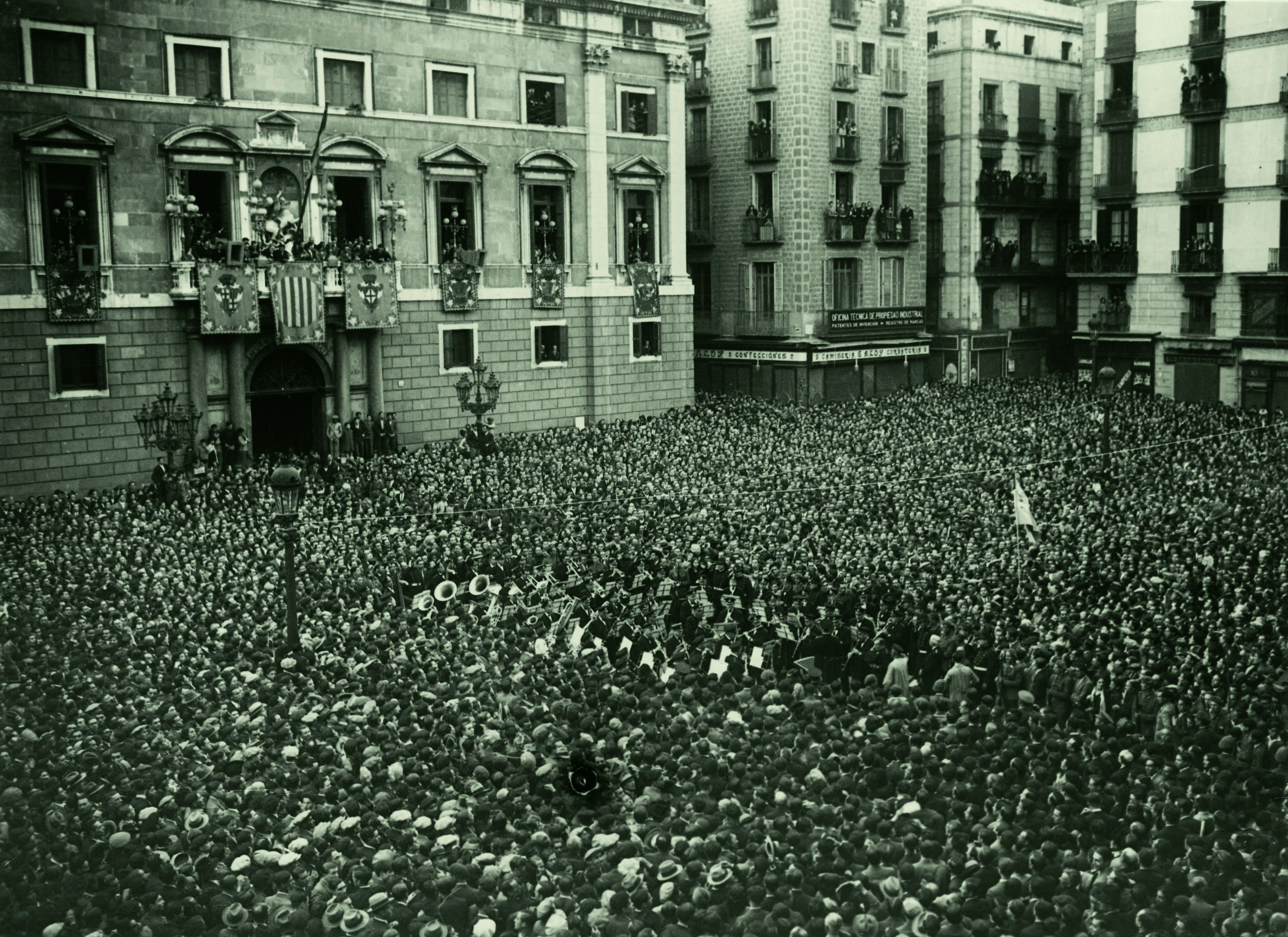
April 14, 1931: Prime Minister Alcalá Zamora proclaims the Second Spanish Republic

Kingdom of Spain

Republic of Spain

The following events occurred in April 1931:

== Wednesday, April 1, 1931 ==
- The Royal Navy battlecruiser HMS Glorious collided with the French ocean liner Florida in a dense fog about 60 miles off Gibraltar. Several crew members of the Florida were killed.
- After leading an internal rebellion within Germany's Brownshirts, Berlin SA commandant Walter Stennes was expelled from the Nazi Party.
- Born:
  - Ita Ever, Estonian stage and film actress; in Paide (d. 2023)
  - Rolf Hochhuth, German author and playwright, in Eschwege (d. 2020)

== Thursday, April 2, 1931 ==
- Actress Pola Negri and Prince Serge Mdivani were divorced.
- Seventeen-year old female baseball pitcher Jackie Mitchell struck out Babe Ruth and Lou Gehrig in succession during an exhibition game between the New York Yankees and minor league Chattanooga Lookouts. Mitchell became a national media sensation, although it was questioned whether Ruth and Gehrig were actually trying or were merely going along with the publicity stunt.

== Friday, April 3, 1931 ==
- Adolf Hitler accused Walter Stennes of plotting to violate the government's emergency dictatorship decree and issued an ultimatum to all SA members demanding they submit a written oath of allegiance by April 12 or face expulsion.
- Born:
  - William Bast, American screenwriter and author, in Wauwatosa, Wisconsin (d. 2015)
  - Gil Robbins, American folk musician and actor, in Spokane, Washington (d. 2011)

== Saturday, April 4, 1931 ==
- Vere Ponsonby, 9th Earl of Bessborough became the Governor General of Canada, replacing the Earl of Willingdon, who had been appointed to be the Viceroy of India.

== Sunday, April 5, 1931 ==
- Police in Berlin arrested 187 German Communist Party members for conducting illegal demonstrations.
- Born: Héctor Olivera, Argentine filmmaker, in Olivos, Buenos Aires

== Monday, April 6, 1931 ==
- The trial of the nine Scottsboro Boys began, only nine days after their arrest.
- Born: Suchitra Sen, film actress in Bengali and Hindi cinema; in Pabna, British India (d. 2014)

== Tuesday, April 7, 1931 ==
- The British Labour Party banned all supporters of Oswald Mosley from its ranks.
- Walter Stennes sued Adolf Hitler and Joseph Goebbels for libel.
- Anton Cermak was elected Mayor of Chicago by a landslide over the incumbent William Hale Thompson.
- Born: Daniel Ellsberg, American analyst and whistleblower, in Chicago, Illinois (d. 2023)

== Wednesday, April 8, 1931 ==
- German Chancellor Heinrich Brüning and Foreign Minister Julius Curtius accepted an invitation to visit Britain in June.
- The Dmitri Shostakovich ballet The Bolt premiered in Leningrad.
- American aviator Amelia Earhart set a world altitude record of 18,415 feet (5,613 m), by flying a Pitcairn PCA-2 autogyro almost three and one-half miles above the Pitcairn Aviation Field at Willow Grove, Pennsylvania near Philadelphia.
- Born: John Gavin, American film actor, later U.S. Ambassador to Mexico from 1981 to 1986; in Los Angeles (d. 2018)
- Died: Erik Axel Karlfeldt, 66, Swedish poet

== Thursday, April 9, 1931 ==
- Osachi Hamaguchi resigned as Prime Minister of Japan, having still not recovered from the attempt on his life in November.
- Eight of the nine Scottsboro Boys were convicted and sentenced to death; a mistrial was declared for the ninth because of his youth. The executions were postponed pending court appeals.

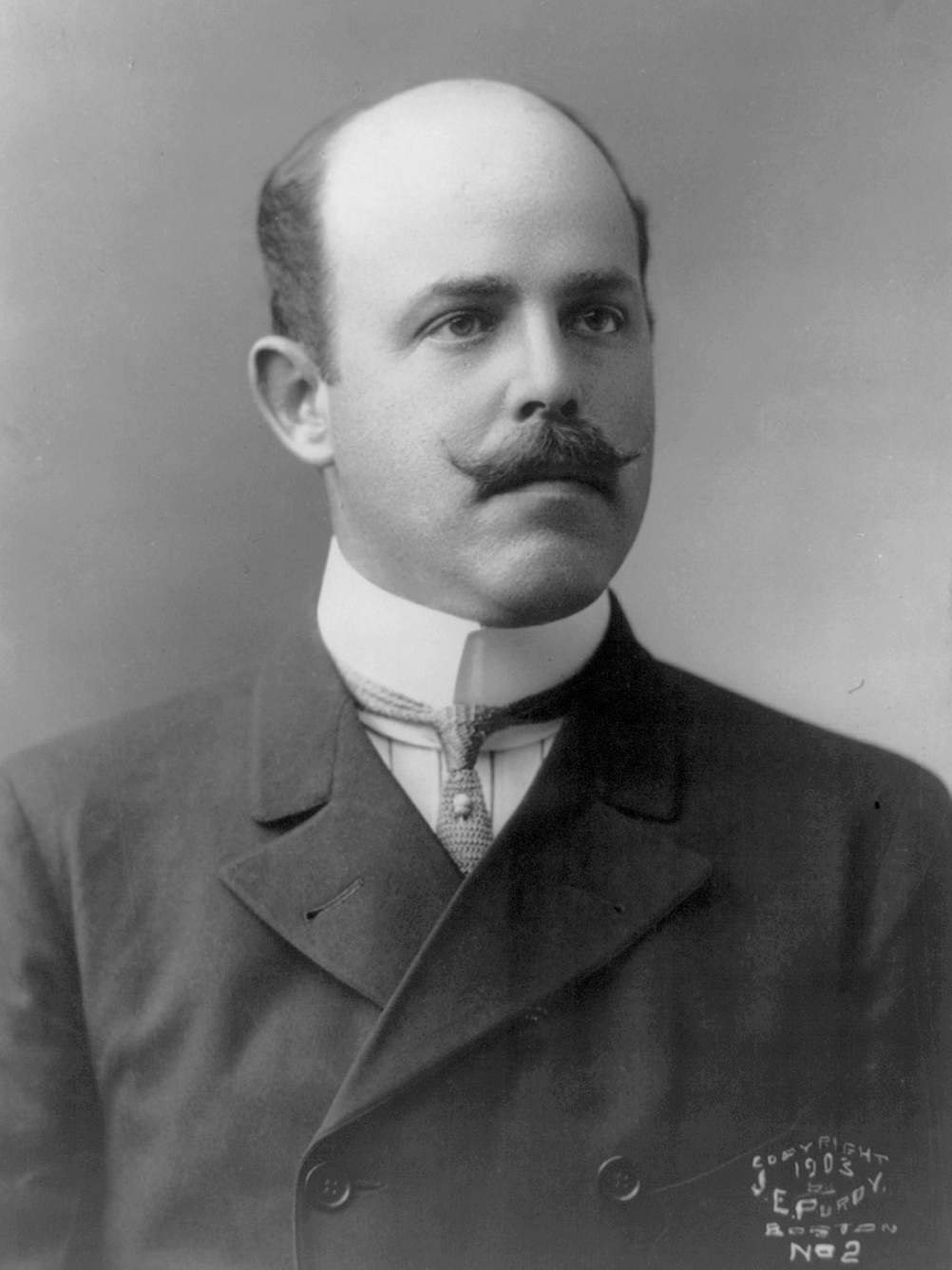
Speaker Longworth

- Died: Nicholas Longworth, 61, U.S. Congressman for Ohio and Speaker of the United States House of Representatives since 1926, died of pneumonia from a sudden illness

== Friday, April 10, 1931 ==
- Prussian Police President Albert Grzesinski ordered the weekly newspaper of Der Stahlhelm banned for three months due to its attacks on the Prussian government.
- Died: Kahlil Gibran, 48, Lebanese artist, poet and writer, died from tuberculosis

== Saturday, April 11, 1931 ==
- By royal decree on the occasion of Orthodox Easter celebrations, 350 Bulgarian political prisoners were pardoned.
- Born:
  - Luís Cabral, 1st President of Guinea-Bissau; in Bissau, Portuguese Guinea (d. 2009)
  - Mustafa Dağıstanlı, Turkish Olympic gold medalist and Greco-Roman wrestler, in Söğütpınar (d. 2022)
  - Johnny Sheffield, American child actor, in Pasadena, California (d. 2010)

== Sunday, April 12, 1931 ==
- Municipal elections were held in Spain. Voters overwhelmingly rejected the rule of King Alfonso XIII by electing republican candidates in 49 out of 50 provincial capitals.

== Monday, April 13, 1931 ==
- The trial of German serial killer Peter Kürten for nine murders, began in Düsseldorf. Kürten took the stand and admitted to the crimes, but explained that he had been driven to take revenge on society for the harsh treatment he received in prison while serving time for burglaries and assaults. Kürten was found guilty on April 22 and would be executed on the guillotine on July 2.

== Tuesday, April 14, 1931 ==
- King Alfonso XIII boarded a ship at Cartagena before dawn and fled Spain, although he did not officially abdicate. That night, provisional president Niceto Alcalá-Zamora stepped onto the balcony of the interior ministry building in Madrid and proclaimed the Second Spanish Republic to a cheering crowd of thousands.
- Francesc Macià proclaimed in Barcelona a Catalan Republic.
- The Montreal Canadiens defeated the Chicago Black Hawks 2–0 to win the Stanley Cup, three games to two.
- Wakatsuki Reijirō became the new Prime Minister of Japan.
- Berlin police Vice President Bernhard Weiss won a defamation lawsuit against Joseph Goebbels, who was ordered to pay 1500 Reichsmarks.

== Wednesday, April 15, 1931 ==
- Queen Victoria Eugenie and her family boarded a train and departed Spain to join Alfonso in exile. Even when passing through staunchly republican areas, large crowds of people cheered and applauded the procession.
- Dr. Harvey Cushing (1869–1939) performs his two-thousandth verified brain tumor operation at the Peter Bent Brigham Hospital in Boston. The operation is filmed with two cameras, and it is the only recording of Cushing's surgery skills.
- Ernie Lombardi made his major league baseball debut with the Brooklyn Robins, going 2-for-2.
- Born: Helen Maksagak, Canadian politician and Inuit rights activist who had served as the first Commissioner of Nunavut upon the territory's formation in 1999, and had previously served as the Commissioner of the Northwest Territories (1995 to 1999); in Bernard Harbour, Northwest Territories (now Nulahugiuq, Nunavut) (d. 2009)
- Died: Joe Masseria, 45, Sicilian-born American Mafia boss of New York's Morello Family Gang, was shot to death by two gunmen after being betrayed by his top lieutenant, Lucky Luciano

== Thursday, April 16, 1931 ==
- Exiled Spanish king Alfonso was mobbed by thousands of admirers upon his arrival in Paris to reunite with his family.
- Serenade for Chamber Orchestra by Bohuslav Martinů was first performed in Paris.
- Born: John Littlejohn (stage name for John Wesley Funchess), African-American blues guitarist, in Lake, Mississippi (d. 1994)
- Ahmed Zaki, Last Prime Minister of the Maldives (1972–1975), Minister of External Affairs, Attorney General (d.1996).

== Friday, April 17, 1931 ==
- Alfonso released a statement saying he was still the king of Spain and expressing confidence that upcoming elections would return him to power.
- The Catalan Republic was called off after talks with the provisional Spanish government, being replaced by the Generalitat, the autonomous government of Catalonia within the Spanish Republic.
- Harlan County War: Special Deputy Sheriff Jessie J. Pace of the Harlan County, Kentucky Sheriff's Office was shot and killed at the Black Mine Coal Company, where a strike had been ongoing for two months.

== Saturday, April 18, 1931 ==
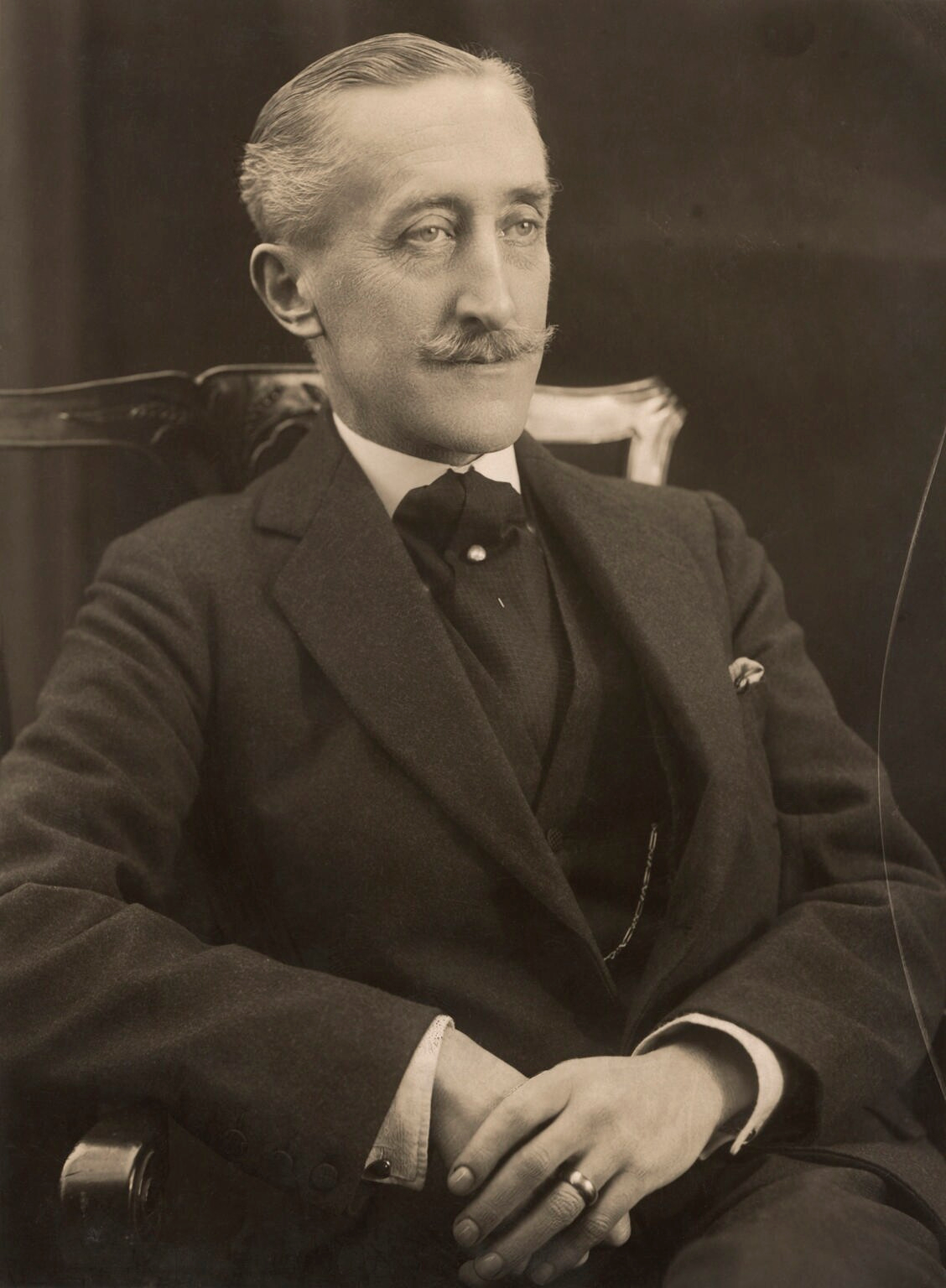
The Earl of Willingdon

- The Earl of Willingdon, Freeman Freeman-Thomas, became the new Viceroy of India after having recently served as the Governor General of Canada. Willingdon replaced Lord Irwin.
- Arsenal F.C. won its first Football League title.

== Sunday, April 19, 1931 ==
- Louis Chiron won the Monaco Grand Prix.
- Born: Fred Brooks, American computer scientist who oversaw the development of the IBM 360 series of computers in the 1960s and early 1970s; in Durham, North Carolina (d. 2022)

== Monday, April 20, 1931 ==
- The British House of Commons passed a bill allowing movie theatres and other places of amusement to open on Sundays.
- The German Supreme Court shortened the ban duration of the weekly newspaper of the Stahlhelm to May 1.
- James P. Henigan won the Boston Marathon.
- Died: Cosmo Duff-Gordon, 68, British baronet and controversial Titanic survivor who departed the sinking ship in a lifeboat that was two-thirds empty

== Tuesday, April 21, 1931 ==
- Great Britain and its Dominions extended diplomatic recognition to the Second Spanish Republic as Alfonso arrived in London.

== Wednesday, April 22, 1931 ==
- Germany recognized the Second Spanish Republic.
- German serial killer Peter Kürten was sentenced to death.
- Died: Isabella, Princess of Asturias, 79, member of Spanish royalty and the aunt of the recently deposed king Alfonso XIII, died days after electing to leave Spain to go into exile in France.

== Thursday, April 23, 1931 ==
- The provisional Spanish government called for general elections on June 21.
- The crime film The Public Enemy, featuring James Cagney in the role that made him a star, was released.

== Friday, April 24, 1931 ==
- New York Governor Franklin D. Roosevelt vetoed a state bill which would have allowed physicians to prescribe medicinal liquor, explaining he was not unsympathetic to its purpose but that the bill was unworkable in its present form due its many "complicated and extravagant provisions".
- Born: Bridget Riley, English op art painter; in West Norwood, London

== Saturday, April 25, 1931 ==
- West Bromwich Albion defeated Birmingham 2–1 in the FA Cup Final at Wembley Stadium.
- The Porsche automobile company was founded in Stuttgart.

== Sunday, April 26, 1931 ==
- Mount Diablo State Park was dedicated in northern California.
- Born: Paul Almond, Canadian television and film screenwriter, director and producer, in Montreal (d. 2015)
- Died: George Herbert Mead, 68, American philosopher, sociologist and psychologist

== Monday, April 27, 1931 ==
- The Zangezur earthquake occurred along the border between Armenia and Azerbaijan, killing almost 3,000.
- On Budget Day in the United Kingdom, Chancellor of the Exchequer Philip Snowden introduced a land value tax and an increase in the gasoline tax. The budget still projected a deficit of £37.4 million.
- Gangster Legs Diamond was shot in the head while dining in a roadside inn near Cairo, New York, but survived.
- Born: Igor Oistrakh, violinist, in Odessa, Ukrainian SSR, Soviet Union (d. 2021)

== Tuesday, April 28, 1931 ==
- An oil well in Gladewater, Texas, exploded, killing 14 workers.

== Wednesday, April 29, 1931 ==
- At least 41 people were killed when a fire broke out on the Cairo–Alexandria express train in Egypt
- Born:
  - Frank Auerbach, German-born British painter, in Berlin (d. 2024)
  - Lonnie Donegan, British folk musician known as "The King of Skiffle"; in Glasgow (d. 2002)

== Thursday, April 30, 1931 ==
- More than 50 workmen were killed in Brazil when 1,000 tons of airplane bombs exploded at a factory near Niterói.
- Died: Sammy Woods, 64, Australian-born English sportsman who represented the English national team in Test cricket and in rugby union
