= Stromberg v. California =

- Supreme Court of the United States

Argued April 15, 1931 Decided May 18, 1931
- Full case name: Yetta Stromberg v. People of State of California
- Citations: 283 U.S. 359 (more) 51 S. Ct. 532; 75 L. Ed. 1117; 1931 U.S. LEXIS 152; 73 A.L.R. 1484

Case history
- Prior: People v. Mintz, 106 Cal. App. 725, 290 P. 93 (Cal. Ct. App. 1930)

Holding
- States cannot infringe on the First Amendment right to freedom of speech and expression.

Court membership
- Chief Justice Charles E. Hughes Associate Justices Oliver W. Holmes Jr. · Willis Van Devanter; James C. McReynolds · Louis Brandeis; George Sutherland · Pierce Butler; Harlan F. Stone · Owen Roberts

Case opinions
- Majority: Hughes, joined by Holmes, Van Devanter, Brandeis, Sutherland, Stone, Roberts
- Dissent: McReynolds
- Dissent: Butler

Laws applied
- U.S. Const. amends. I, XIV; Cal. Penal Code § 403a (1929)

Stromberg v. California, 283 U.S. 359 (1931), is a landmark decision of the Supreme Court of the United States in which the Court held, 7–2, that a California statute banning red flags was unconstitutional because it violated the First and Fourteenth Amendments to the United States Constitution. In the case, Yetta Stromberg was convicted for displaying a red flag daily in the youth camp for children at which she worked, and was charged in accordance with California law. Chief Justice Charles Evans Hughes wrote for the seven-justice majority that the California statute was unconstitutional, and therefore Stromberg's conviction could not stand.

This decision is considered a landmark in the history of First Amendment constitutional law, as it was one of the first cases where the Court extended the Fourteenth Amendment to include a protection of the substance of the First Amendment, in this case symbolic speech or "expressive conduct", from state infringement.

== Background ==
The Better America Federation (BAF), a group whose goal was to clear the State of California from what they deemed to be dangerous dissent, targeted the Pioneer Summer Camp (PSC) in summer 1929. The youth camp for working-class children was maintained by a number of different groups and organizations, some of which were either openly Communist or had expressed sympathy for the Communist Party's goals. California had a state law, enacted in 1919, that prohibited public display of a red flag. The BAF persuaded a local sheriff to search the Pioneer Summer Camp. The resultant search turned up a red flag; the sheriff then arrested Yetta Stromberg, a summer teacher at the camp, along with several other employees.

Stromberg was a nineteen-year-old student at the University of Southern California, and a member of the Young Communist League, an international organization affiliated with the Communist Party. In the state trials, the charge brought up against her was in relation to a daily ceremony that took place at the summer camp on a loaned ranch near Yucaipa, California, where she worked as a teacher. During the ceremony, Stromberg supervised and directed the youth in raising a red flag, and in pledging allegiance to "the workers' red flag, and to the cause for which it stands, one aim throughout our lives, freedom for the working class." Stromberg was also found to have owned books and other printed materials advocating violence and armed uprisings, though she testified that none of such materials were employed in her teaching of the children.

Stromberg was tried and convicted in state court. She appealed the conviction to the Supreme Court on the grounds that the California statute in question outlawed the symbol of a legally recognized party. Stromberg's attorneys cited Holmes' concept of the "clear and present danger" test, asserting that the circumstances of the act must be considered as part of the decision.

== Supreme Court ==
In a 7–2 decision, Chief Justice Hughes followed the logic of the Holmes doctrine introduced in Schenck v. United States, 249 U.S. 47 (1919), and concluded on 18 May 1931 that the broad red flag ban was too vague, and could be used to disrupt the constitutionally-protected opposition by citizenry to those in power. The California legislature repealed the law in 1933.

=== Majority opinion ===
In an opinion delivered by Chief Justice Charles Evans Hughes, the Court considered whether any of the three clauses of the California law, were, as the applicant alleged, a violation of her constitutionally-protected rights. The Court had previously established in a series of cases that the right of free speech is essential to liberty, and is protected by the Due Process Clause of the Fourteenth Amendment. The opinion noted, however, that this protection did not extend to forms of expression which may incite violence, crime, or the overthrow of organized government by unlawful means. The Court found little reason to question the validity of the second and third clauses of the statute as they pertain to such prohibited forms of expression and concentrated instead on the first clause.

The first clause prohibited individuals to display "a red flag, banner or badge or any flag, badge, banner, or device of any color or form whatever in any public place or in any meeting place or public assembly," even when such a red flag did not represent a symbol of opposition to organized government (clause 2) or as a stimulus to anarchistic action (clause 3).

Upon examining the vagueness of the statute, the Court concluded that a law so indefinite as to permit the punishment of peaceful and orderly opposition exercised in accordance with legal means and constitutional imitations was "repugnant to the guarantee of liberty contained in the Fourteenth Amendment." In thus finding the first clause of the statute invalid, the Court set aside the conviction of the appellant, as the conviction appeared to have rested exclusively on that first clause. The Court did not proceed to rule on the constitutionality of the second and third clauses of the statute.

=== McReynolds' dissent ===
Associate Justice James C. McReynolds dissented from the Court's opinion.

Justice McReynolds argued in his dissent that the Court has, at many times in the past, applied the rule that it may not review any question arising from a state court ruling unless it is shown that the question was determined in the state court or at least duly presented for such a determination. In this specific instance, no such challenges appeared to have been brought.

Further, when the case was considered by the Court of Appeals, it held that since the petitioner was charged with violation of all the clauses of the statutes and thus convicted, the conviction could not be reversed even if one of the clauses was found to be invalid. McReynolds agreed with this determination and suggested that the judgment should be affirmed.

=== Butler's dissent ===
Justice Butler wrote a detailed dissent in this matter, addressing several different issues.

The Court, in the majority opinion, held the first clause of the California statute to be invalid, and as it found that the conviction may have depended exclusively upon that clause, it reversed the state court. Justice Butler, however, believed that the record affirmatively showed that the petitioner was not convicted for violation of the first clause. Prior to the trial of this case, the California Supreme Court had already deemed invalid a city ordinance that would make unlawful the public display of a red flag, emblem, etc. Thus, under that decision, the California state courts were already directed to hold invalid the first clause of the statute, as it construed peaceable opposition to organized government.

Further, the effect of the instructions given to the jury was to inform them that the defendant had the unlimited right to advocate changes in the government, so long as such advocacy was peaceful; the jury was further informed that any organization peaceably advocating changes in the government could adopt any flag and it was not possible to make that unlawful.

The record does not show that the defendant separately challenged in the trial court the validity of the first clause. Defendant's counsel likewise failed to object to state's instructions, and told the Court of Appeals that he was satisfied that the instructions were correct. The Court of Appeals found the second and third provisions of section 403a of the California Penal Code to be in compliance with the state and federal Constitutions' guarantees of freedom of speech. But it stated that the constitutionality of the first clause was "questionable," taking particular issue with the phrase "of opposition to organized government." The Court of Appeals suggested that this phrase could be eliminated from the section without introducing material changes to its purpose.

Justice Butler argued that due consideration makes it clear that the defendant did not claim that the jury could have found her guilty of violating the first clause of the statute; that the Court of Appeals did not rule on the question of whether such a first-clause conviction would be constitutional; and lastly, that the validity of the first clause was mentioned in the concurring opinion only upon the question of whether the second and third clauses must be found invalid if the first clause was to be found unconstitutional.

Justice Butler believed that in this case, the Court was not called upon to decide whether the display of the flag constituted constitutionally-protected speech, nor to decide whether such speech was protected by the Fourteenth Amendment, nor whether the real or imagined anarchy that could follow a successful opposition to organized government creates a sufficiently compelling reason to prohibit such activities. It appears (though he does not specify it in his dissent) that he viewed the matter as that of procedural challenges, rather than a case of broad protections of freedom of speech.

== See also ==
- List of United States Supreme Court cases, volume 279
- Palko v. Connecticut
- Fourteenth Amendment
