= McBoyle v. United States =

- Supreme Court of the United States

Argued February 26–27, 1931 Decided March 9, 1931
- Full case name: McBoyle v. United States
- Citations: 283 U.S. 25 (more) 51 S. Ct. 340; 75 L. Ed. 816; 1931 U.S. LEXIS 861

Case history
- Prior: Certiorari to the Circuit Court of Appeals for the Tenth Circuit

Holding
- The National Motor Vehicle Theft Act does not apply to aircraft.

Court membership
- Chief Justice Charles E. Hughes Associate Justices Oliver W. Holmes Jr. · Willis Van Devanter; James C. McReynolds · Louis Brandeis; George Sutherland · Pierce Butler; Harlan F. Stone · Owen Roberts

Case opinion
- Majority: Holmes, joined by unanimous

Laws applied
- U.S. Const.

McBoyle v. United States, 283 U.S. 25 (1931), was a United States Supreme Court case regarding whether the theft of an airplane was illegal under federal law, given that the law only criminalized theft of a "vehicle."

== Background ==
William McBoyle transported a plane that he knew to be stolen from Ottawa, Illinois to Guymon, Oklahoma and was arrested. He was accused of violating the National Motor Vehicle Theft Act on the theory that the plane was a type of "vehicle" covered by the act. He was sentenced to three years' imprisonment and a fine of $2,000 (equivalent to $38,000 in 2025). The judgment was affirmed by the United States Court of Appeals for the Tenth Circuit. The Supreme Court granted certiorari on the question of whether the National Motor Vehicle Theft Act applied to aircraft.

== Case ==
The petitioners claimed that since the act did not specifically mention aircraft, it should not apply to McBoyle's case. Furthermore, the petitioners argued that Congress likely did not intend to criminalize the theft of aircraft when the law was passed, since airplanes barely existed at the time.

== Decision ==
The court held that, since other acts, such as the Tariff Act of 1930, specifically excluded aircraft in their definitions of a vehicle, the law must be interpreted narrowly. Justice Holmes stated:

Although it is not likely that a criminal will carefully consider the text of the law before he murders or steals, it is reasonable that a fair warning should be given to the world in language that the common world will understand, of what the law intends to do if a certain line is passed. To make the warning fair, so far as possible the line should be clear.

This case is widely regarded as a strong example of the use of the canon of ejusdem generis ("of the same kind, class, or nature").

== See also ==
- List of United States Supreme Court cases, volume 283
