= Teleprompter Corp. v. Columbia Broadcasting =

- Supreme Court of the United States

Argued January 7, 1974 Decided March 4, 1974
- Full case name: Teleprompter Corp. et al. v. Columbia Broadcasting System, Inc., et al.
- Citations: 415 U.S. 394 (more) 94 S. Ct. 1129; 39 L. Ed. 2d 415; 181 U.S.P.Q. 65

Case history
- Prior: Columbia Broad. Sys., Inc. v. Teleprompter Corp., 476 F.2d 338 (2d Cir. 1973); cert. granted, 414 U.S. 817 (1973)

Holding
- Receiving a television broadcast from a "distant" source does not constitute a "performance".

Court membership
- Chief Justice Warren E. Burger Associate Justices William O. Douglas · William J. Brennan Jr. Potter Stewart · Byron White; Thurgood Marshall · Harry Blackmun; Lewis F. Powell Jr. · William Rehnquist

Case opinions
- Majority: Stewart, joined by Brennan, White, Marshall, Powell, Rehnquist
- Concur/dissent: Blackmun
- Dissent: Douglas, joined by Burger

Teleprompter Corp. v. Columbia Broadcasting, 415 U.S. 394 (1974), was a United States Supreme Court case in which the Court held that receiving a television broadcast from a "distant" source does not constitute a "performance".

== See also ==
- Loretto v. Teleprompter Manhattan CATV Corp.
