= Philadelphia Park Amusement Co. v. United States =

- Court: United States Court of Claims
- Full case name: Philadelphia Park Amusement Co. v. United States
- Decided: November 30, 1954
- Citation: 126 F. Supp. 184

Court membership
- Judges sitting: John Marvin Jones, Benjamin Horsley Littleton, Samuel Estill Whitaker, J. Warren Madden, Don Nelson Laramore

Case opinions
- Decision by: Laramore

Keywords
- Cost basis; fair market value

In Philadelphia Park Amusement Co. v. United States, 126 F. Supp. 184 (Ct. Cl. 1954), the United States Court of Claims ruled that the cost basis of property received in a taxable exchange is the fair market value of the property received.

== Background ==
Strawberry Bridge was owned by the taxpayer and, after it was discovered that the bridge needed significant repairs, the taxpayer gave the bridge to the City of Philadelphia in exchange for a 10-year extension of the taxpayer's railway franchise in Fairmount Park which was owned by the City of Philadelphia. Since the 10-year extension had no market value, the taxpayer used the depreciating bridge as his new basis, then proceeded to claim overpayment of tax due to his failure to claim any depreciation. The Internal Revenue Service disagreed with the taxpayer's reasoning, and disallowed his claim for a larger depreciation deduction.

Initially, a disagreement also arose out of the fact that the Commissioner amortized the original cost of the franchise over the period beginning on the date the franchise was granted, while the taxpayer amortized it over the period beginning on the date the railway began operating. However, this disagreement was abandoned by both the parties and was not mentioned in either party's brief, nor was there any mention of it during the oral arguments.

The opinion was written by Judge Laramore, with Judges Madden, Whitaker, Littleton, and Chief Judge Jones all concurring. No concurring opinion was published.

== Court holding ==
The court found that both Strawberry Bridge and the 10-year exchange had a value and the contract between the taxpayer and the City of Philadelphia had the proper amount of consideration. Looking to §1012 (then §113) of the tax code, which defines basis as the cost of the property the court found that "one view is that the cost basis of property received in a taxable exchange is the fair market value of the property given in the exchange." The reverse, that one could determine the value of the property given by considering the value of the property received, was likewise true. Thus, the court found that in order to maintain harmonization between the different sections of the tax code, it was necessary that the cost basis of the property received be equal to its fair market value at the time of the exchange.

Though the taxpayer contested that the value of either the extended franchise or the Strawberry Bridge was not ascertainable, the court disagreed. Though the court acknowledged that it was possible that a piece of property's value was not quantifiable (citing Helvering v. Tex-Penn Oil., 200 U.S. 481, 499; Gould Securities Co. v. United States, 96 F.2d 780) it believed that those circumstances were rare. Therefore, the case was remanded back to the Commissioner to determine the price.

== Implications ==
This case implies that almost anything can be quantified, and greatly narrows the cases in which the courts (and the I.R.S.) would accept the premise that the exchange could not be quantified.

There are three implications from the holding in Philadelphia Park:

1) Following a taxable exchange the taxpayer's basis in the property he received in the exchange is always equal to the fair market value of the property received. Therefore, a taxpayer can always determine his or her basis in something exchanged, because it will be the value of the thing it is exchanged for. Philadelphia Park demonstrates that the taxpayers' basis in the thing he/she received must be the fair market value of the thing at the time of receipt.

2) Every taxable year stands alone—the Court uses the idea of basing the current year's tax consequences based on what should have happened in the prior year.

3) Where the taxpayer does not know, or cannot reasonably ascertain the value of the property received in the exchange, all he needs to do is determine the value of the property received as consideration; he will then be able to assume that the value of the property given is equal to the value of property received.
