= Louise Huntington =

American actress

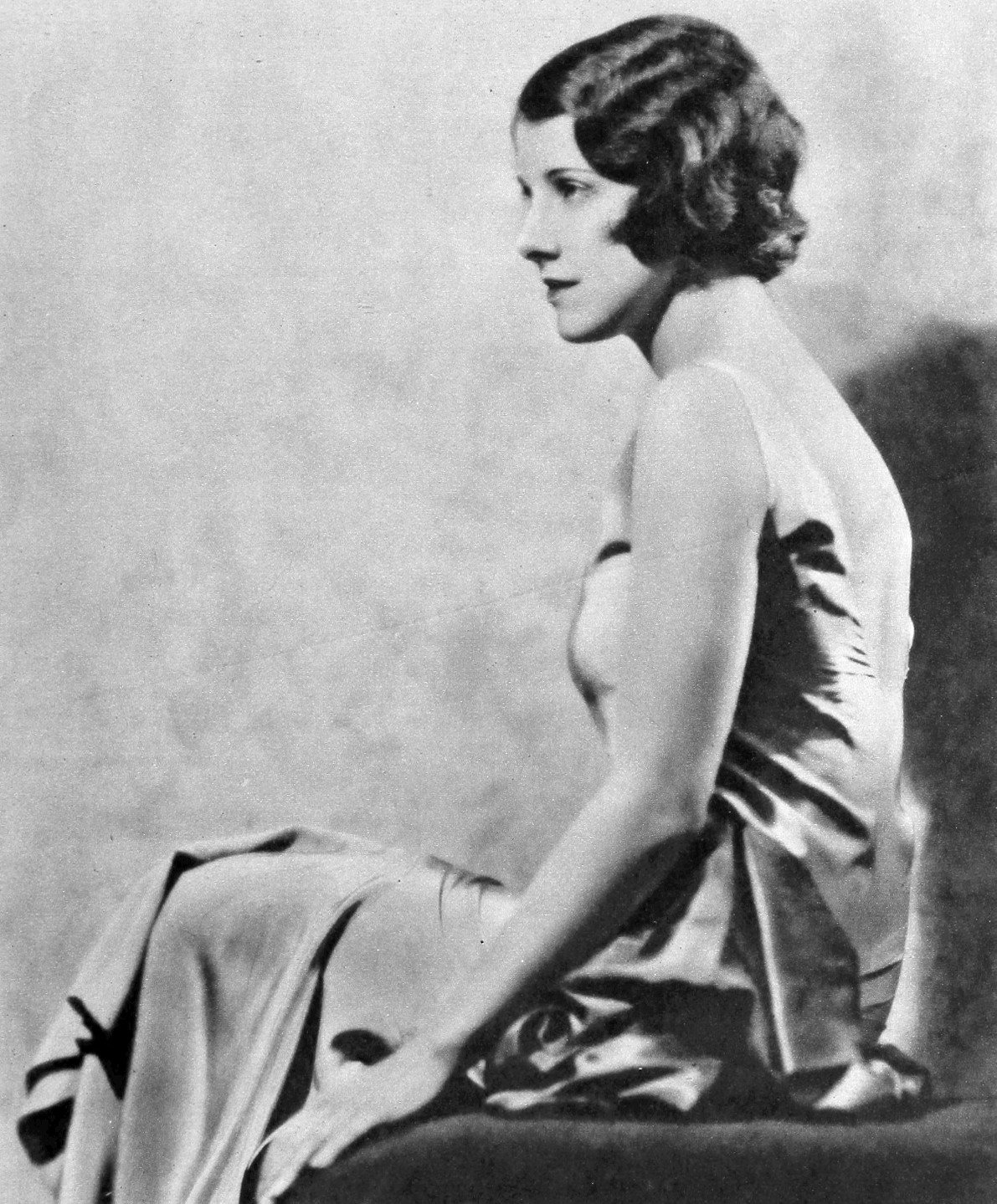
- Huntington in 1930
- Born: November 1, 1904; Dallas, Texas
- Died: June 2, 1997 (aged 92); Summit, New Jersey
- Occupations: Stage, film actress
- Spouse(s): Robert Roberts, Sydney Houston

Louise Huntington (November 1, 1904 – June 2, 1997) was an American stage and screen actress appearing on Broadway in the 1920s and on screen in the 1930s.

== Early years ==
Huntington was born in Dallas, Texas, and moved with her family to Houston at age 4. She attended Wellesley College and the University of Texas (UT) and was a member of The Curtain Club at UT. She gained additional acting experience with the Houston Little Theater.

== Career ==
=== Film ===
Huntington gained a contract with Fox in 1930. Fox executive Winfield Sheehan signed her after seeing her in New York. Her film career included silent movies as well as some of the first sound productions. The Viking, in which she appeared in 1931, was the first Canadian-produced film to include sound.

=== Stage ===
Huntington acted with a stock theater company in Denver and performed with Kenneth Harlan in vaudeville.

On Broadway, Huntington appeared in The World We Make (1939), Pygmalion (1938), Captain Jinks of the Horse Marines (1938), Elizabeth the Queen (1930), The Nut Farm (1929), and The Constant Nymph (1926). Huntington's stage career took her overseas, including being part of a troupe that toured Africa in 1928.

== Later years ==
Later in life Huntington continued performing on stage and on television. She also directed theater and continued to act in commercials into her 80s. She was married to Robert Roberts, whom she later divorced. Her second husband was Sydney Houston who died in the mid-1970s. She died in Summit, New Jersey in 1997.

== Personal life ==
Huntington had two Daughters. Lynn Roberts Roalsen. DOB 2-24-1933 living in Las Vegas Nevada. She has 3 grandchildren. Diana Huntington Lejuez. DOB 1-28-1937 living in Summit New Jersey. She has 8 Grand Children.

== Selected filmography ==
- Three Rogues (1931) ... aka Not Exactly Gentlemen. Directed by Benjamin Stoloff and co-starring Fay Wray. Huntington played Bronco's girl
- The Viking (1931) Directed by Varick Frissell and George Melford. Huntington played Mary Joe. Director Varick Frissell, cinematographer Alexander G. Penrod, and almost all the film crew were killed on March 15, 1931, when the sealing ship SS Viking, from which they were shooting additional footage, exploded in ice off the Horse Islands on the northern Newfoundland coast. Huntington was not present on this shoot day.
- Fair Warning (1931) Directed by Alfred L. Werker and co-starring George O'Brien. Huntington played Kate Cumberland
- The Man Who Came Back (1931) Directed by Raoul Walsh. Huntington played Clarice (Stephen's first wife)

== Selected Broadway credits ==
- The World We Make [Original, Play, Drama] Head Nurse; Neighbor November 20, 1939 - January 27, 1940
- Pygmalion [Revival, Play, Comedy] Mrs. Higgins Jan 25, 1938 - February 12, 1938
- Captain Jinks of the Horse Marines [Revival, Play, Comedy] Mrs. Jinks Jan 25, 1938 - February 12, 1938
- Elizabeth the Queen [Original, Play, Drama, History] Lady-in-Waiting November 3, 1930 - Mar 1931
- The Nut Farm [Original, Play, Comedy] Agatha Sliscomb October 14, 1929 - November 1929
- The Constant Nymph [Original, Play] Paulina Sanger December 9, 1926 - April 1927
