= Quidi Vidi =

Coordinates: 47°34′54″N 52°40′39″W

- Neighbourhood
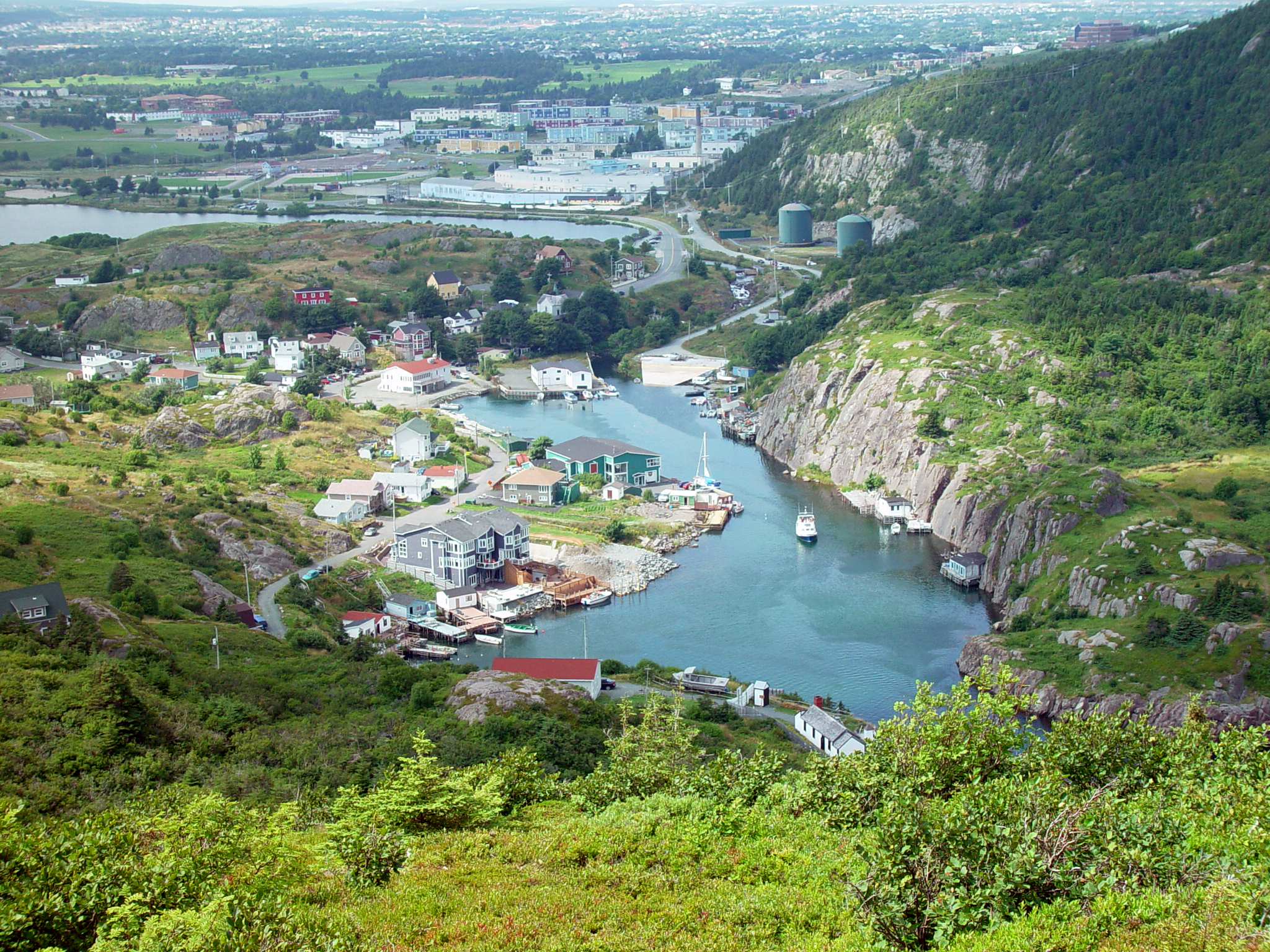
- Quidi Vidi as seen looking west from the top of Cuckhold's Cove Head
- Interactive map of Quidi Vidi
- Country: Canada
- Province: Newfoundland and Labrador
- City: St. John's
- Ward: 2

Government
  - Administrative body: St. John's City Council
  - Councilor: Ophelia Ravencroft

Quidi Vidi is a neighbourhood in St. John's, Newfoundland and Labrador. Its pronunciations vary, even amongst longtime residents, but "Kiddy Vidi" is the most common. The village is adjacent to Quidi Vidi Lake (where the Royal St. John's Regatta is held the first Wednesday in August, weather permitting). Quidi Vidi's harbour is known as "The Gut". Located in Quidi Vidi is the Quidi Vidi Battery Provincial Historic Site. The village is home to several small businesses.

== History ==
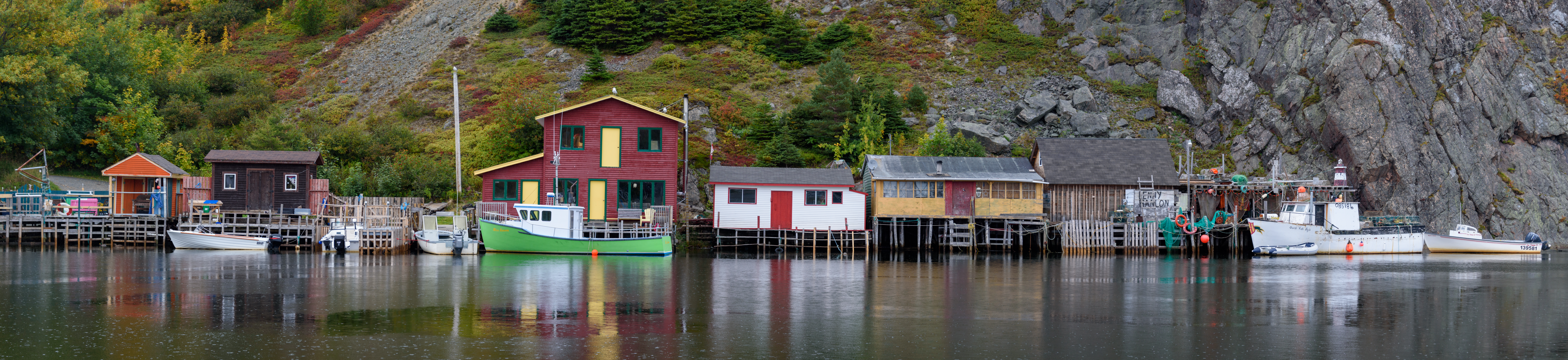
"The Gut" harbor at Quidi Vidi, with fishing houses along the side

From around 1600, fishermen arrived "each spring on the fishing ships from South Devon (Dartmouth, Teignmouth, Totnes, Dawlish, Torbay)" and "made their way" to Quidi Vidi, where they established fishing rooms. They then went home each fall. However, a few overwintered "to take care of the rooms and procure timber for construction and fuel". Around the middle of that century, some began staying permanently and houses were built, and these fishermen married and had families. However, "even as late as 1835, migratory men from southwest England and southeast Ireland were still engaged in the cod fishery at Quidi Vidi".

=== Batteries ===
In 1762, the French constructed Quidi Vidi Battery. When the French left, it became part of the system of batteries defending St John's. A reconstruction of this site opened in 1967, and it was designated the Province's first Historic Site in 1974. However, since 2011 it has been closed to the public, because of "a lack of available parking and accessibility issues" and, according to a local radio station, is in a "state of disrepair, empty and overgrown".

There was another battery, the Quidi Pass Battery, which was constructed by the British during the early years of the Napoleonic Wars, on a hill above both the village and the Lake. There is a sign marking this site.

=== Mallard Cottage ===
Mallard Cottage "built sometime between 1820 and 1840, ... was the home of the Mallard family who settled in Quidi Vidi at the beginning of the 19th century. With its low hipped-roof and two-room, central chimney plan, it is typical of houses built by the immigrants who came from southeast Ireland to Newfoundland in the first half of the 19th century". The cottage is recognized as a National Historic Site of Canada. The cottage was the home of the Mallards, a fishing family, until the 1980s. In 1985, the cottage became an antique shop.

In 2011, the cottage was purchased and restored along guidelines set out by the Heritage Foundation of Newfoundland and Labrador. In 2013, the work was recognized with a Southcott Award. The same year, the newly restored cottage was established as a restaurant.

=== Christ Church ===
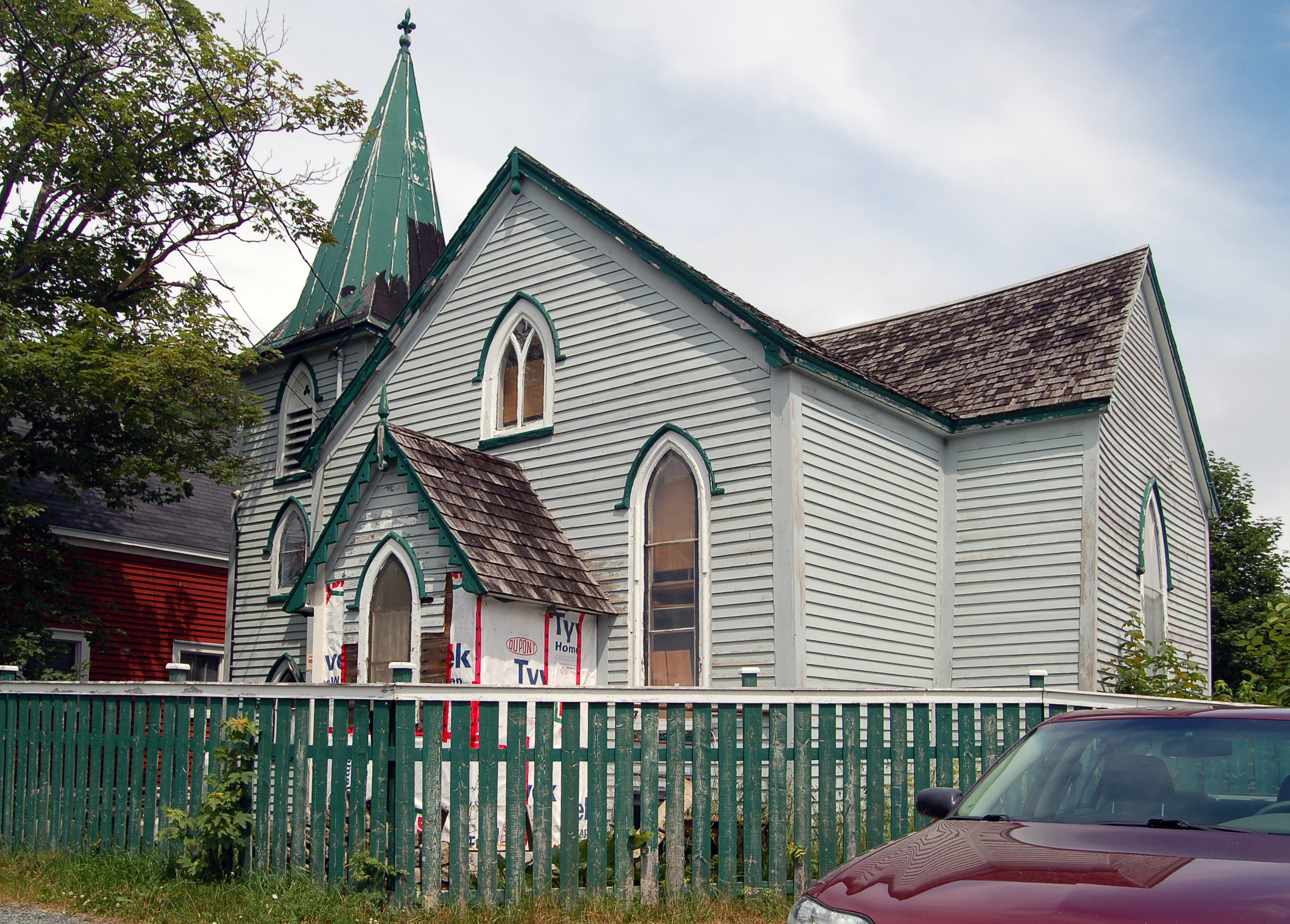
Christ Church, Quidi Vidi, built 1842 (spire 1890)

It was in 1834 that "Anglicans, Methodists, and Congregationalists combined to build a church," though services had been conducted in the village for some years. However, co-operation between the churches failed, and a new building was constructed by the Anglicans, to a "simple cruciform plan of Henry Purcell of Cork," which was consecrated by Bishop Spencer in 1842, "as a chapel of ease for St. Thomas’s Anglican Church in St. John’s". A bell tower was added in 1890. In 1966, the building was taken over by the Newfoundland Historic Trust. Subsequently, the church building was a town hall, an antique store, the shop of a furniture restorer, and in "the early ’70s it also served as a rehearsal space for a group of St. John’s theatre enthusiasts headed by Chris Brookes—a group that eventually became The Mummers Troupe. Finally, it became a private residence, though still retaining some original features.

=== World War II ===
Quidi Vidi was also involved in the construction of the Pepperrell Air Force Base. Work began on October 15, 1940, near Quidi Vidi Lake. During April and May 1941, the Newfoundland Base Contractors' personnel began arriving, and construction was taken over by them.

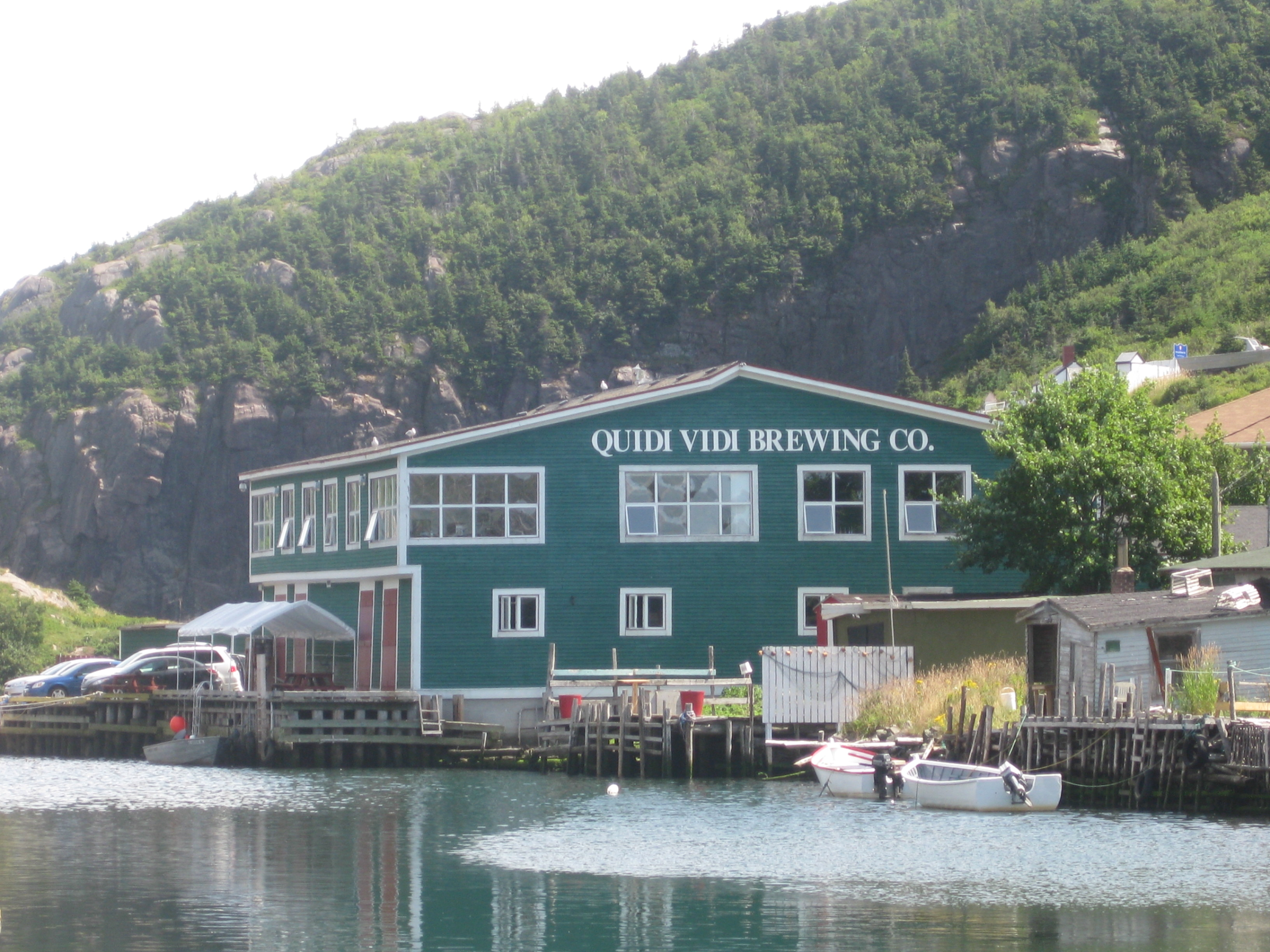
Quidi Vidi Brewing Company

== Brewery ==
The Quidi Vidi Brewing Company was founded in 1996 by David Fong and is located in a former fish plant in the popular tourist village of the same name. A variety of different beers are brewed, including Iceberg Beer, which is made with water from pieces of icebergs harvested off the coast of Newfoundland.

== Quidi Vidi Village Artisan Studios ==
Also in Quidi Vidi is the Quidi Vidi Village Artisan Studios, which is an incubator for craft-based entrepreneurial businesses.

== 1930 filming ==
In 1930, Varick Frissell filmed most of The Viking (named for a sealing ship) in Quidi Vidi. For realistic footage, Frissell then took his crew to the Grand Banks and Labrador to collect exciting action sequences. The film debuted at the Nickel Theatre at St. John's on March 5, 1931, where Frissell decided that his movie needed more real scenes from the Labrador ice floes. Within days, Frissell with his crew had joined the SS Viking for its annual seal hunt. The ship got trapped in ice near the Horse Islands. On March 15, Frissell and 26 others were killed when an explosion on the Viking set off a fire and the ship sank. Some of the survivors made the over-ice trek to the Horse Islands, while some were rescued by other vessels dispatched to the area.

== Famous residents ==
Prominent Canadians from Quidi Vidi include theatre director Walter Learning.

== See also ==
- Neighbourhoods in St. John's, Newfoundland and Labrador
- List of communities in Newfoundland and Labrador
