= List of companies headquartered in St. John's, Newfoundland and Labrador =

St. John's is the capital and largest city of the Canadian province of Newfoundland and Labrador. This list compiles notable companies which have their headquarters located in St. John's.

== List of companies ==
Name	Industry	Reach	Founded
Bluedrop Performance Learning	Training development	North America	1992
Bowring Brothers Limited	Retail	Canada	1811
CHC Helicopter Corporation	Air transportation	International	1987
Cougar Helicopters	Air transportation	Eastern Canada	1987
ExxonMobil Canada	Oil and Gas	Canada	1999
Fortis Inc.	Electricity generation & distribution	International	1987
Job Brothers & Co., Limited	Production and development of fisheries	International	1750
Marine Atlantic	Transportation	Atlantic Canada	1976
Nalcor Energy	Energy	Newfoundland and Labrador	2007
Newfoundland Capital Corporation Limited	Media	Canada	1986
Newfoundland Chocolate Company	Chocolatier	Newfoundland and Labrador	2008
Newfoundland Power Inc.	Electricity generation & distribution	Newfoundland and Labrador	1924
Newfoundland and Labrador Hydro	Electricity generation & distribution	Eastern Canada and North-eastern United States	1954
Newfoundland and Labrador Liquor Corporation	Retail	Newfoundland and Labrador	1954
North Atlantic Refining	Petroleum refining and marketing	Canada	1994
Pope Productions	Production	Canada	1998
Provincial Aerospace (formerly Provincial Airlines)	Air Transportation	Newfoundland and Labrador and Quebec	1972
Quidi Vidi Brewing Company	Brewing company	Canada	1996
Stirling Communications International	Broadcasting	International	1955
