= Frissel =

Frissel may refer to:

== People ==
- Seraph Frissell (1840–1915), American physician, medical writer
- Toni Frissell, an American photographer, known for her fashion photography, World War II photographs and portraits
- Varick Frissell, an American filmmaker born in Boston, Massachusetts

== Places ==
- Mount Frissell, located on the border of southwest Massachusetts and northwest Connecticut, is a prominent peak of the Taconic Range
