= The Viking (1931 film) =

1931 film

- Still from the film
- Directed by: George Melford Varick Frissell
- Written by: Garnett Weston (scenario and dialogue)
- Story by: Garnett Weston
- Produced by: Varick Frissell
- Starring: Louise Huntington Charles Starrett Arthur Vinton Robert Bartlett
- Narrated by: Sir Wilfred Grenfell
- Cinematography: Alfred Gandolfi Maurice Kellerman Alexander G. Penrod
- Edited by: H. P. Carver
- Production company: J.D. Williams Newfoundland-Labrador Film Company
- Distributed by: J.D. Williams
- Release dates: March 5, 1931 (Newfoundland); June 21, 1931 (United States)
- Running time: 70 minutes
- Countries: Newfoundland; United States
- Language: English

The Viking (French: Ceux du Viking), also known as White Thunder and Vikings of the Ice Field, is a 1931 Newfoundland/American adventure film about sealing directed by George Melford. The Viking was the first film to record sound and dialogue on location, with the use of magnetic wire recording. It is best known for the explosion aboard the ship SS Viking (an actual sealing ship) during filming, in which many members of the crew, including producer Varick Frissell, were killed. It remains the incident with the largest loss of life in film history.

== Plot ==
Set on the coast of Newfoundland, a rivalry develops between Jed Nelson, a seal hunter, and Luke Oarum, a local man considered a jinx, when Jed worries that Luke may try to steal his girlfriend Mary Joe. Jed goads Luke into accompanying him on an Arctic sealing expedition on the Viking, commanded by Capt. Barker, calling him a coward.

They both end up in a hunting party on the ice floes. The entire group find themselves stranded. Jed tries to kill Luke, but he has been rendered nearly blind by the snow and his gunshot misses. First Luke, then Jed, become separated from the main group, which finds its way safely back to the ship. Barker waits for a while, having the ship's horn sounded repeatedly in hopes of guiding the lost pair, but eventually gives up, and the Viking returns to Saint John's. Mary Joe is told the news.

Luke finds Jed. Jed is ready to give up, but despite the attempt on his life, Luke forces Jed to keep going. They trudge across the ice floes all the way back to land, arriving home and interrupting a church service. Luke and Mary Joe embrace, while Jed vows that he will beat senseless any man who derides the character of his new friend.

== Cast ==
As listed in the credits:

- Louise Huntington as Mary Joe
- Charles Starrett as Luke Oarum
- Capt. Robert Abram Bartlett as Capt. Barker
- Arthur Vinton as Jed Nelson

The SS Viking was used for sealing along the Newfoundland coast (1904–1931) and featured heavily in the film bearing the same name.

== Production ==
American-born producer Varick Frissell's previous short films, The Lure of Labrador and The Swilin' Racket (also known as The Great Arctic Seal Hunt), prompted him to make a full-length feature entitled Vikings of the Ice Field. Paramount Pictures put up $100,000 to finance the production, while insisting that Hollywood personnel be used. Frissell hired director George Melford, who had attended McGill University in Montreal and had experience in filming Canadian subjects previously.

By 1930, Frissell had completed most of the principal photography on location in Quidi Vidi. For realistic footage, Frissell then took his crew to the Grand Banks and Labrador to film action sequences. The film was privately shown at the Nickel Theatre at St. John's on March 5, 1931. After this screening, Frissell decided that his film needed more real scenes from the Labrador ice floes. Within days, Frissell and his crew had joined the SS Viking for its annual seal hunt. The ship got trapped in ice near the Horse Islands.

On March 15, 1931, while trying to film an iceberg, Frissell, Alexander Penrod, 25 crew members and a stowaway were killed in an explosion. Some of the survivors made the over-ice trek to the Horse Islands, while others were rescued by vessels dispatched to the area.

Despite the fatal accident, the film was completed and released in June 1931. The title was changed from White Thunder to The Viking. A French-language version Ceux du Viking was released in 1932.

== Reception ==
Reviews for The Viking varied, while the story was generally panned. The New York Times review referred to the film's story as "sketchy". The reviewer, however, noted: "'The Viking', like Mr Varick's silent work, 'The Swilin' Racket', has many marvelous scenes of the ice fields and of the adventures of men on a seal hunt off Labrador. It is enhanced by being made with sound effects, but the dialogue, like the story, is merely incidental."

The Theater Guild Magazine found the story "melodramatic" and the screenplay uninteresting in comparison to the cinematography. The Film Daily gave a negative review, noting the "weakness" of the story.

White Thunder, a National Film Board documentary on Varick Frissell's life, directed by Newfoundlander Victoria King, was released in 2002.

== Bibliography ==
- Rhodes, Gary Don. White Zombie: Anatomy of a Horror Film. Jefferson, North Carolina: McFarland & Company, 2001. ISBN 978-0-7864-0988-4.
- Rist, Peter. Guide to the Cinema(s) of Canada. Westport, Connecticut: Greenwood Publishing Group, 2001. ISBN 978-0-3132-9931-5.
