= List of shipwrecks in April 1878 =

The list of shipwrecks in April 1878 includes ships sunk, foundered, grounded, or otherwise lost during April 1878.

== 1 April ==
List of shipwrecks: 1 April 1878
Ship	State	Description
Brenda	Norway	The ship was driven ashore and wrecked at Thurso, Caithness, United Kingdom. She was on a voyage from Christiania to Troon, Ayrshire, United Kingdom.
Devon	United Kingdom	The schooner was abandoned off Molène, Finistère, France. She was towed in to Brest, Finistère.
Ellen Williams	United Kingdom	The schooner collided with a steamship off Great Cumbrae and was severely damaged. She was on a voyage from Glasgow, Renfrewshire to Liverpool, Lancashire. She was towed in to Millport in a waterlogged condition.
Frederick Snowdon	United Kingdom	The steamship was driven ashore at Callantsoog, North Holland, Netherlands. She was on a voyage from Rotterdam, South Holland to Newcastle upon Tyne, Northumberland.
Seven	United Kingdom	The brig was driven ashore on Skagen, Denmark. Her crew were rescued. She was on a voyage from Hartlepool, County Durham to Stockholm, Sweden.
Vermont	United Kingdom	The ship foundered in the Bay of Biscay with the loss of one of her 23 crew. Survivors were rescued by the brig Patra (United Kingdom). Vermont was on a voyage from Cardiff, Glamorgan to Rio de Janeiro, Brazil.

== 2 April ==
List of shipwrecks: 2 April 1878
Ship	State	Description
British Queen	United Kingdom	The fishing smack was abandoned in the English Channel. Her crew were rescued.
Eliza	United Kingdom	The schooner was abandoned at sea. Her crew were rescued. She was on a voyage from Briton Ferry, Glamorgan to Le Tréport, Seine-Inférieure, France.
Frank Emmett	United Kingdom	The barque ran aground at Smyrna, Ottoman Empire. She was on a voyage from Smyrna to Ghent, East Flanders, Belgium.
Gitto	Norway	The barque was abandoned in the Atlantic Ocean. Her crew were rescued by Elliots (United Kingdom). Gitto was on a voyage from Oulu, Grand Duchy of Finland to Liverpool, Lancashire, United Kingdom.
May Lily	(United Kingdom of Great Britain and Ireland) Isle of Man	The dandy was wrecked on the Barrels Rocks, off the coast of County Wexford with the loss of four of her eight crew.
New John	United Kingdom	The smack was abandoned at sea. She was taken in to Liverpool.

== 5 April ==
List of shipwrecks: 5 April 1878
Ship	State	Description
Ardanach	United Kingdom	The ship ran aground in Dally Bay, Wigtownshire. She was on a voyage from Glasgow, Renfrewshire to Bordeaux, Gironde, France. She was refloated on 14 April and taken in tow for Glasgow.
Blossom	United Kingdom	The schooner caught fire and sank off Stonehaven, Aberdeenshire. Her crew were rescued by the tug America (United Kingdom). Blossom was on a voyage from Sunderland, County Durham to Aberdeen.
Georges et Marie	France	The ship sank at Guadeloupe. She was on a voyage from Newport, Monmouthshire to Guadeloupe. The wreck was later dispersed by explosives.
John and Winthrop	United States	The whaler, a barque, foundered in the Pacific Ocean. Her crew were rescued on 13 April by Vitalia (Chile).
John Lettosen	United Kingdom	The ship foundered 30 nautical miles (56 km) off Sagua La Grande, Cuba with the loss of a crew member. She was on a voyage from Cardiff, Glamorgan to Havana, Cuba.

== 6 April ==
List of shipwrecks: 6 April 1878
Ship	State	Description
Hampton	United Kingdom	The schooner collided with the steamship Gipsey (United Kingdom) off the Bar Lightship ( Trinity House) and was severely damaged. Hampton was taken in tow and beached at New Ferry, Cheshire.
Henry	United Kingdom	The smack collided with the fishing trawler Swallow (United Kingdom) and sank in the North Sea. Her crew were rescued by Swallow.
Liza McMillan	United Kingdom	The ship ran aground on the Little Cronan Rock, off Ardrossan, Ayrshire. She was on a voyage from Ardrossan to Oban, Argyllshire.
Newarp Lightship	Trinity House	The lightship was run into by the steamship Cædmon (United Kingdom) and was severely damaged at the bow. She was towed in to Great Yarmouth, Norfolk.
Spartan	Netherlands	The steamship ran aground on the Haisborough Sands, in the North Sea off the coast of Norfolk. Her thirteen crew were rescued; three by a yawl and ten by the Palling Lifeboat British Workman ( Royal National Lifeboat Institution). Spartan was on a voyage from Hamburg, Germany to London, United Kingdom. She floated off the next day and drove ashore at Winterton-on-Sea, Norfol, where she was wrecked.
Unnamed	Flag unknown	The brig ran aground on the Maplin Sand, in the North Sea off the coast of Essex, United Kingdom. She was refloated with the assistance of a tug and taken in to the River Thames.
Unnamed	Flag unknown	The ship capsized off Ouessant, Finistère, France. She was taken in tow by a steamship but subsequently foundered.

== 7 April ==
List of shipwrecks: 7 April 1878
Ship	State	Description
Josie A. Devereaux	United States	The brigantine caught fire and was abandoned in the Caribbean Sea. Her crew were rescued. She was on a voyage from Pensacola, Florida to Santos, Brazil.
Rainbow	United Kingdom	The smack was driven ashore and wrecked at Great Yarmouth, Norfolk. Her crew were rescued.

== 8 April ==
List of shipwrecks: 8 April 1878
Ship	State	Description
Athenian	United Kingdom	The steamship foundered in the Atlantic Ocean 30 nautical miles (56 km) west by south of the Isles of Scilly. Her 25 crew took to two boats; seventeen in one boat were rescued the next day by the steamship Henry S. Edwards (United Kingdom), those in the other boat landed at Crookhaven, County Cork on 10 April. Athenian was on a voyage from Liverpool, Lancashire to Constantinople, Ottoman Empire.
Consett	United Kingdom	The steamship ran aground at Sunderland, County Durham. She was refloated with the assistance of two tugs.
Eric	United Kingdom	The sealer, a barque, was abandoned off Boa Vista Island, Azores in a sinking condition.
Ethelbert	United Kingdom	The smack foundered off Borkum, Germany with the loss of all six crew.
Leander	United Kingdom	The brigantine foundered in the Irish Sea off St Bees Head, Cumberland. Her three crew were rescued by the fishing trawler Ada (United Kingdom). Leander was on a voyage from Bangor, Caernarfonshire to Silloth, Cumberland. She cam ashore at thee Point of Ayre, Isle of Man the next day and was wrecked.
Miranda	United Kingdom	The steamship ran aground on the Kinburn Spit. She was on a voyage from Nicolaieff, Russia to Malta.
Royal Standard	United Kingdom	The steamship ran aground in the Sulina branch of the Danube 40 nautical miles (74 km) from its mouth.

== 9 April ==
List of shipwrecks: 9 April 1878
Ship	State	Description
Buoy	United Kingdom	The schooner was driven ashore at Whiteabbey, County Antrim.
Corinth	United Kingdom	The steamship ran aground on the Briggs Shoal, off the coast of County Down and sank. Her crew were rescued. She was on a voyage from Neath Abbey, Glamorgan to Belfast, County Antrim.
Ida	United Kingdom	The schooner ran aground in the Weser. She was on a voyage from Bremen, Germany to Port Madoc, Caernarfonshire.
Malwa	United Kingdom	The schooner was abandoned at sea. Her crew were rescued by the schooner Statesman (United Kingdom). Malwa was on a voyage from Port Madoc to Ramsgate, Kent.
Union	United Kingdom	The ship was driven ashore near Lossiemouth, Moray. She was on a voyage from Ipswich, Suffolk to Invergordon, Ross-shire.
Wimburn	United Kingdom	The barque was driven ashore near Polkerris, Cornwall. She was on a voyage from Hull, Yorkshire to Doboy, Georgia, United States.

== 10 April ==
List of shipwrecks: 10 April 1878
Ship	State	Description
Adelaide	United Kingdom	The schooner was run into by the steamship Johanna (France) and sank at Cardiff, Glamorgan. Her four crew were rescued. Adelaide was on a voyage from Cardiff to Portsmouth, Hampshire.
Black Sea	United Kingdom	The ship was driven ashore at Kertch, Russia. She was refloated on 22 April with the assistance of five steamships.
Frederick Alice	United Kingdom	The fishing smack was driven ashore in the "Helpton Gap", Yorkshire.
Miriam	United Kingdom	The ship was discovered abandoned off Bardsey Island, Caernarfonshire. She was towed in to Holyhead, Anglesey by the tug United States (United Kingdom).
Pioneer	United Kingdom	The fishing vessel was driven ashore at Withernsea, Yorkshire. Her crew survived.
Resolute	United Kingdom	The smack was run down and sunk 30 nautical miles (56 km) off the Dutch coast by the steamship Jeannie (United Kingdom). Her five crew were rescued by Jeannie.
Theresina	United Kingdom	The brigantine was driven ashore and wrecked at Port Natal, Natal Colony. Her crew were rescued.
No. 56	United Kingdom	The pilot cutter was holed by the propeller of the steamship Prado (Flag unknown) and sank off Nash Point, Glamorgan. The sole crewman was rescued.

== 11 April ==
List of shipwrecks: 11 April 1878
Ship	State	Description
Ann	United Kingdom	The schooner was driven ashore and wrecked 4 nautical miles (7.4 km) south of Scarborough, Yorkshire. Her crew survived.
Childwall Hall	United Kingdom	Childwall Hall The steamship was wrecked at Sagres, Portugal with the loss of fifteen lives. She was on a voyage from Liverpool, Lancashire to Bombay, India.
Fano	Flag unknown	The barque was driven ashore at New Brighton, Cheshire, United Kingdom. She was on a voyage from Liverpool to Africa.
Groot Hendrick	Netherlands	The ship was driven ashore and wrecked at Pittenweem, Fife, United Kingdom. Her crew were rescued.
Jylland	Denmark	The brig was driven ashore at Westkapelle, Zeeland, Netherlands. She was on a voyage from a Baltic port to Ghent, East Flanders, Belgium.

== 12 April ==
List of shipwrecks: 12 April 1878
Ship	State	Description
Anna Camp	United States	The ship departed from New York for Shanghai, China. She subsequently foundered with the loss of all 40 crew. Wreckage from the ship washed up on the Brazilian coast in June.
Spartan	United Kingdom	The ship ran aground at Cardiff, Glamorgan. The barque Nominia (France) collided with Tycoon (United Kingdom), which the collided with Spartan, damaging both vessels.
Yarm	United Kingdom	The steamship ran aground at Kertch, Russia.

== 13 April ==
List of shipwrecks: 13 April 1878
Ship	State	Description
Anglo-Norman	United Kingdom	The barque was driven ashore at "Gotto", Japan. She was refloated and towed in to Nagasaki, Japan in a sinking condition.
Berendina	Netherlands	The schooner was abandoned in Carnarvon Bay. Her crew survived. was on a voyage from Liverpool, Lancashire, United Kingdom to Riga, Russia.
Cygnet	United Kingdom	The ship was driven ashore at Tyrella, County Down. Her four crew were rescued by the Tyrella Lifeboat Memorial ( Royal National Lifeboat Institution). Cygnet was on a voyage from Silloth, Cumberland to Dundalk, County Louth.
Tarruca	Spain	The barque collided with the steamship Joseph Pease (United Kingdom) and sank in the Mediterranean Sea. Her crew were rescued by Joseph Pease. Tarruca was on a voyage from Barcelona to Havana, Cuba.

== 14 April ==
List of shipwrecks: 14 April 1878
Ship	State	Description
Baron Spathspey	United Kingdom	The ship ran aground at North Sunderland, Northumberland and was damaged. She was refloated.
Drumlochty	United Kingdom	The steamship struck a submerged object off Cape Cornwall, Cornwall and was holed. She was on a voyage from Newport, Monmouthshire to Plymouth, Devon. She was taken in to Hayle, Cornwall in a sinking condition.
Paruco	Spain	The barque collided with the steamship Joseph Pease (United Kingdom). She capsized and sank. Her crew were rescued by Joseph Pease. Paruco was on a voyage from Barcelona to Havana, Cuba.
Terentia	United Kingdom	The barque was driven ashore at Ardnacross, Argyllshire. She was on a voyage from Greenock, Renfrewshire to Demerara, British Guiana. She was refloated on 16 April and towed in to Troon, Ayrshire for repairs.

== 15 April ==
List of shipwrecks: 15 April 1878
Ship	State	Description
Capella	Norway	The barque was driven ashore at Cromer, Norfolk, United Kingdom. She was on a voyage from Christiania to Pensacola, Florida. She was refloated and taken in to Grimsby, Lincolnshire, United Kingdom in a leaky condition.
Mary	United Kingdom	The ship foundered in the North Sea 8 nautical miles (15 km) off Cromarty. Her crew were rescued. She was on a voyage from Cromarty to Macduff, Aberdeenshire.
San Domingo	United Kingdom	The steamship ran aground at Hoek van Holland, South Holland, Netherlands. She was on a voyage from Pomaron, Portugal to Rotterdam, South Holland. She was refloated with the assistance of three tugs and resumed her voyage.
Unnamed	Ottoman Navy	The man-of-war was driven ashore and wrecked on Cerigotto, Greece with the loss of four of her 180 crew. She was on a voyage from Crete to a port in Epirus, Greece.

== 16 April ==
List of shipwrecks: 16 April 1878
Ship	State	Description
Arbutus	United Kingdom	The passenger ship ran aground and sank at the Mull of Kintyre, Argyllshire. All on board were rescued. She was on a voyage from Londonderry to the Clyde.
Boadicea	United Kingdom	The schooner was driven ashore in the Niewe Diep. She was on a voyage from Hamburg, Germany to Bruges, West Flanders, Belgium.
Duke	United Kingdom	The ship ran aground at Chandipore, India and was severely damaged. She was on a voyage From "Chandbally" to Cochin, India. She was refloated on 27 April.
Luxor	United Kingdom	The steamship put in to Lisbon, Portugal on fire. She was on a voyage from Cartagena, Spain to Dover, Kent.
Rügenwalde	Germany	The steamship was driven ashore on Skagen, Denmark. She was on a voyage from Leer to Riga, Russia.

== 17 April ==
List of shipwrecks: 17 April 1878
Ship	State	Description
Mic Mac	Canada	The steam sealer was crushed by ice and sank 8 nautical miles (15 km) north north east of the Horse Islands, Newfoundland Colony. Her crew survived.
Nova Zembla	United Kingdom	The steam sealer was wrecked at Lerwick, Shetland Islands. Her crew, more than 38 people, were rescued. She was later refloated and departed for Dundee, Forfarshire on 5 May under tow of the tug Kingfisher (United Kingdom).
Seaton	United Kingdom	The steamship ran aground in the Danube 12 nautical miles (22 km) north of Sulina, United Principalities.

== 18 April ==
List of shipwrecks: 18 April 1878
Ship	State	Description
Albert Edward	United Kingdom	The steamship was driven ashore 2 nautical miles (3.7 km) east of Folkestone, Kent. Her crew and all 125 passengers were landed. She was on a voyage from Boulogne, Pas-de-Calais, France to Folkestone. She was refloated.
Dunmore	United Kingdom	The steamship struck rocks and foundered 4 nautical miles (7.4 km) south west of Ouessant, Finistère, France. Thirteen of her 25 crew were rescued, twelve were reported missing. Dunmore was on a voyage from Nicholaieff, Russia to London.
Flavio	Italy	The barque was driven ashore at Dundalk, County Louth, United Kingdom. She was on a voyage from New York, United States to Dundalk. She was refloated with the assistance of the tug Dundalk (United Kingdom).
Maerke To	Norway	The ship was driven ashore at Fredrikshavn, Denmark. She was refloated and taken in to Fredrikshavn in a leaky condition.
Maggie	United Kingdom	The schooner was driven ashore at the south point of Öland, Sweden. Her crew were rescued. She was on a voyage from Königsberg, Germany to Anstruther, Fife.
Paul	Flag unknown	The ship was driven ashore at Fredrikshavn. She was refloated and resumed her voyage.
Pleiades	United Kingdom	The ketch was driven ashore at Yarmouth, Isle of Wight.
Riga	Flag unknown	The barque was driven ashore at Fredrikshavn. She was refloated and resumed her voyage.
Sisters	United Kingdom	The ship was driven ashore at Fredrikshavn. She was refloated with assistance.
Sorromostro	United Kingdom	The steamship struck rocks off the Île de Sein, Finistère, France. She put in to Brest, Finistère in a sinking condition.

== 19 April ==
List of shipwrecks: 19 April 1878
Ship	State	Description
Alfred	United Kingdom	The steamship ran aground in the Dardanelles. She was refloated and resumed her voyage.
Anna	Norway	The barque was driven ashore on Sanda Island, Argyllshire, United Kingdom. She was on a voyage from Greenock, Renfrewshire, United Kingdom to Miramichi, New Brunswick, Canada. She was refloated the next day with the assistance of two tugs and towed into the Clyde for repairs.
Anna	Norway	The schooner was driven ashore and wrecked at Cresswell, Northumberland, United Kingdom. She was on a voyage from Holmestrand to Sunderland, County Durham, United Kingdom.
Champion	United Kingdom	The brig was wrecked on the North Cheek Reef, in Robin Hood's Bay. Her crew were rescued by the Coastguard.
Dispatch	United Kingdom	The steamship ran aground on the Whitby Rock. She was on a voyage from South Shields, County Durham to London. She was refloated the next day.
Eagle	United Kingdom	The brigantine was driven ashore at the South Foreland, Kent. She was on a voyage from Liverpool, Lancashire to Saint Petersburg, Russia. She was refloated with the assistance of the tug Granville (United Kingdom) and taken in to Dover, Kent.
Florida	United Kingdom	The schooner was driven ashore and wrecked at Dunbeath, Caithness. Her crew were rescued. She was on a voyage from Königsberg, Germany to Campbeltown, Argyllshire.
Frederick Wilhelm Jebens	Germany	The ship ran aground on the Middelgrund. She was on a voyage from Memel to London, United Kingdom. She was refloated and resumed her voyage.
Hector	United Kingdom	The steamship ran aground. She was refloated but ran aground again.
Kirksteed	United Kingdom	The steamship was driven ashore at Falsterbo, Sweden. She was on a voyage from Stettin, Germany to an English port. She was refloated.
Luchina Orlandini	Italy	The brig ran aground on the Melora Banks, off Livorno, and sank. Her crew were rescued.
Margretha	Netherlands	The galiot was run into by the steamship Sestao (United Kingdom) and sank in the River Tyne at Pelaw, County Durham. Her crew were rescued.
Marjory	United Kingdom	The smack was run down by the hopper barge No. 8 (United Kingdom) and sank in the Clyde. Both crew were rescued.
Salisbury	United Kingdom	The steamship ran aground on the Whitby Rock. She was on a voyage from South Shields, County Durham to Hull, Yorkshire. She was refloated the next day and put back to the River Tyne.
Scotia	United Kingdom	The brig foundered off Malpica de Bergantiños, Spain. Her crew were rescued. She was on a voyage from Huelva, Spain to Swansea, Glamorgan.
William Connal	United Kingdom	The steamship ran aground on the Long Rock, off Ballywalter, County Down. She was on a voyage from Glasgow, Renfrewshire to a French port. She had been abandoned by 25 April. She had been refloated by 18 May and taken in to Donaghadee, County Down by 18 May.

== 20 April ==
List of shipwrecks: 20 April 1878
Ship	State	Description
Anna	Norway	The brig was driven ashore and wrecked at Cresswell, Northumberland, United Kingdom. She was on a voyage from Holmestrand to Sunderland, County Durham, United Kingdom.
Eliza	United Kingdom	The brig was driven ashore at Souter Point, Northumberland. Her nine crew were rescued by the Whitburn Lifeboat.
Florence	United Kingdom	The ship ran aground at Calcutta, India. She was on a voyage from Madras to Calcutta.
Gem	United Kingdom	The schooner was driven ashore and wrecked at Gourdon, Kincardineshire with the loss of two of her five crew. Survivors were rescued by a coble. She was on a voyage from South Shields, County Durham to Wick, Caithness.
Leon Raymundo	United Kingdom	The schooner ran aground on the Boar's Head Rocks, 5 nautical miles (9.3 km) east of Lossiemouth, Moray and was severely damaged. She was on a voyage from Rochester, Kent to Buckie, Moray. She was refloated on 29 April and taken in to Lossiemouth.
Margaret	United Kingdom	The ship ran aground on "Skilsholm Island" and sank. Her crew survived. She was on a voyage from Briton Ferry, Glamorgan to Belfast, County Antrim.
Sir Robert Peel	Norway	The barque was driven ashore and wrecked on Sanday, Orkney Islands, United Kingdom. She was refloated on 3 May and towed in to Kirkwall in a leaky condition.
William and Jane	United Kingdom	The ship struck a sunken wreck off Saltfleet, Lincolnshire and was damaged. She put in to King's Lynn, Norfolk in a leaky condition.

== 21 April ==
List of shipwrecks: 21 April 1878
Ship	State	Description
American	Germany	The barque ran aground on the Blackwater Bank, in the Irish Sea. She was on a voyage from Liverpool, Lancashire, United Kingdom to New York. She was refloated and put back to Liverpool.
Otter	United Kingdom	The barque sprang a leak in the Atlantic Ocean. She was discovered 50 nautical miles (93 km) off The Lizard, Cornwall by steamship James Gray and towed in to Falmouth, Cornwall, where she arrived in a sinking condition on 23 April.
Warrior Queen	United Kingdom	The ship capsized at Ystad, Sweden and was wrecked. She was on a voyage from Hartlepool, County Durham to Memel, Germany.

== 22 April ==
List of shipwrecks: 22 April 1878
Ship	State	Description
Abrune	United Kingdom	The steamship ran aground 3 nautical miles (5.6 km) off Ameland, Friesland, Netherlands and was severely damaged. Her crew were rescued on 24 April by two Dutch tugs, one of which was the Zuyder Zee. She was on a voyage from Danzig, Germany to London.
India	United Kingdom	The full-rigged ship ran aground at Cardiff, Glamorgan. She was on a voyage from Cardiff to Hong Kong. She was subsequently run into by the barque Fortunata Camilla (Italy). India was refloated and taken in to Penarth, Glamorgan for repairs.
Mizpah	United Kingdom	The ship collided with the steamship Kong Magnus (Norway) and sank in the English Channel. Her crew were rescued.
Scindia	United Kingdom	The barque was abandoned in the Atlantic Ocean 45°20′N 35°17′W). Her 23 crew were rescued by the barque Tjomo (Norway). Scindia was on a voyage from New York, United States to London.
Snowdoun	United Kingdom	The steamship was driven ashore 1 nautical mile (1.9 km) east of Leith, Lothian. Her passengers were taken off. She was on a voyage from Hull, Yorkshire to Leith. Snowdoun was refloated with the assistance of two tugs and taken in to Leith in a severely leaky condition.
Tagus	United Kingdom	The ship was driven ashore and wrecked at Port Errol, Aberdeenshire. She was on a voyage from Newcastle upon Tyne, Northumberland to Helmsdale, Sutherland.
William and Ann	United Kingdom	The ship was driven ashore and sank at Scarborough, Yorkshire. Her crew survived. She was on a voyage from Hartlepool, County Durham to Great Yarmouth, Norfolk.

== 23 April ==
List of shipwrecks: 23 April 1878
Ship	State	Description
Achilles	United Kingdom	The steamship was driven ashore at Burr Point, County Down. She was on a voyage from Warrenpoint, County Antrim to Barrow-in-Furness, Lancashire.
Alrune	United Kingdom	The steamship was driven ashore on Ameland, Friesland, Netherlands and was wrecked. She was on a voyage from Danzig, Germany to London.
Belle Justine	France	The ship was wrecked in the Hooghly River at Berhampore, India. Her crew were rescued. She was on a voyage from Berghampore to Marseille, Bouches-du-Rhône.
City of Dublin	United Kingdom	The steamship was driven ashore and wrecked at Peniche, Portugal. Her 26 crew were rescued. She was on a voyage from Cardiff, Glamorgan to Gibraltar.
Elise	Sweden	The schooner ran aground at "Holmetunge", Denmark.
Frau Peter	Germany)	The schooner collided with the steamship Albion (United Kingdom) and sank at Christiania, Norway. Her crew were rescued by Albion. Frau Peter was on a voyage from Burntisland, Fife, United Kingdom to Wilhelmshafen.
Jean d'Arc	France	The ship ran aground on the Haisborough Sands, in the North Sea off the coast of Norfolk, United Kingdom. Her crew were rescued by the Palling Lifeboat Workman ( Royal National Lifeboat Institution). Jean d'Arc was on a voyage from Christiania to Trouville-sur-Mer, Calvados. She was refloated with assistance from the tug Victoria (United Kingdom) and taken in to Great Yarmouth, Norfolk in a waterlogged condition.
Queen of the West	United Kingdom	The trow foundered in the Kingroad, off Portishead, Somerset. She was on a voyage from Newport, Monmouthshire to Bristol, Gloucestershire.
Ricardo	Italy	The ship ran aground in the River Tweed. She was on a voyage from Rosario, Argentina to Berwick upon Tweed, Northumberland, United Kingdom. She was refloated on 27 April.

== 24 April ==
List of shipwrecks: 24 April 1878
Ship	State	Description
Alpha, or Hansen	Norway	The schooner was wrecked on the Haisborough Sands, in the North Sea off the coast of Norfolk, United Kingdom. Her crew were rescued by a fishing smack. She was on a voyage from Sandefjord to London, United Kingdom.
Constantia	Norway	The brig was driven ashore on Vlieland, Friesland, Netherlands. She was on a voyage from Christiania to Harlingen, Friesland.
Curlew	United Kingdom	The barque ran aground in the Gironde. She was on a voyage from Baltimore, Maryland, United States to Bordeaux, Gironde, France.
Queen of the West	United Kingdom	The ship foundered in the Bristol Channel off Portishead, Somerset.

== 25 April ==
List of shipwrecks: 25 April 1878
Ship	State	Description
Broughton	United Kingdom	The barque ran aground on the Arklow Bank, in the Irish Sea off the coast of County Wicklow. Her fifteen crew were rescued by the Arklow Lifeboat. She was on a voyage from Liverpool, Lancashire to Buenos Aires, Argentina.
HMS Fervent	Royal Navy	The Albacore-class gunboat ran aground in the Bristol Channel off the coast of Somerset. She was refloated on 28 April and taken in to Bristol, Gloucestershire.
Unnamed	Norway	The barque ran aground in the Salisbury Bank, in the River Dee.

== 26 April ==
List of shipwrecks: 26 April 1878
Ship	State	Description
Bolivia	United Kingdom	The ship ran aground in the Tagus. She was on a voyage from the British Cameroons to Falmouth, Cornwall. She was refloated and resumed her voyage.
Montague	United Kingdom	The steamship ran aground at Wexford. The Wexford Lifeboat took off eighteen passengers.
Neos Alexandros	Greece	The brig was wrecked on Marmara Island, Ottoman Empire. She was on a voyage from Galaţi, United Principalities to Trieste.
Ville de Camillos	Spain	The barque sprang a leak and foundered 10 nautical miles (19 km) south west of Cornwall, United Kingdom. Her thirteen crew survived. She was on a voyage from Cardiff, Glamorgan, United Kingdom to Barcelona.

== 27 April ==
List of shipwrecks: 27 April 1878
Ship	State	Description
Batavia	United Kingdom	The steamship was driven ashore at Boston, Massachusetts, United States. She was on a voyage from Boston to Queenstown, County Cork and Liverpool, Lancashire. She was refloated and resumed her voyage.
Cuba	Germany	The full-rigged ship was driven ashore at Dungeness, Kent, United Kingdom. She was on a voyage from London, United Kingdom to New York, United States. She was refloated the next day with the assistance of two tugs and taken in to Gravesend, Kent in a leaky condition.
Gladys	United Kingdom	The steamship ran aground at New York. She was on a voyage from New York to Antwerp, Belgium. She was refloated on 29 April and resumed her voyage.
Koning der Nederlanden	Netherlands	The steamship was driven ashore in the Nieuwe Diep. She was on a voyage from Batavia, Netherlands East Indies to the Nieuw Diep.
Mangrove	United Kingdom	The steamship collided with the steamship Rosa Mary (Germany) and sank in the Mediterranean Sea 25 nautical miles (46 km) off Cape Bon, Beylik of Tunis. All on board were rescued. Mangrove was on a voyage from Liverpool to Bombay, India.
Victoria	United Kingdom	The steamship ran aground at Newhaven, Sussex. Her 200 passengers were taken off by the steamship Brighton. Victoria was on a voyage from Newhaven to Dieppe, Seine-Inférieure.

== 28 April ==
List of shipwrecks: 28 April 1878
Ship	State	Description
Prima	Sweden	The steamship ran aground at Trollhättan. She was on a voyage from Riga, Russia to Trollhättan.
No. 4	Belgium	The pilot schooner was run down and sunk off the Isle of Wight, United Kingdom by the steamship Aurora (Norway). Her crew were rescued.

== 29 April ==
List of shipwrecks: 29 April 1878
Ship	State	Description
Alrune	Netherlands	The ship was driven ashore at Harlingen, Friesland.
Bengal	United Kingdom	The ship aas driven ashore at Amagansett, New York, United States. She was on a voyage from a Mediterranean port to Boston, Massachusetts and New York City. She was refloated.
Buona Madre	Italy	The brig was driven ashore near Fraserburgh, Aberdeenshire, United Kingdom. She was on a voyage from Inverness to Newcastle upon Tyne, Northumberland, United Kingdom.
Caledonia	United Kingdom	The sloop sprang a leak and foundered 4 nautical miles (7.4 km) off Larne, County Antrim. Her three crew took to a boat; they were rescued by the steamship Topaz (United Kingdom). Caledonia was on a voyage from Ballachulish, Inverness-shire to Glasgow, Renfrewshire.
Fury	United Kingdom	The tug was driven ashore at Tynemouth, Northumberland. She was refloated.
Johns	United Kingdom	The steam wherry struck the Well Rocks and sank at Seaham, County Durham, United Kingdom. All four people on board were rescued by a pilot boat.
Modoc	Canada	The barque was wrecked on the Isla de Lobos, Uruguay. Her crew survived. She was on a voyage from Newport, Monmouthshire, United Kingdom to Buenos Aires, Argentina.
HMS Monarch	Royal Navy	The battleship ran aground off Sheerness, Kent whilst avoiding a collision with a schooner. She was refloated.
Prospero	United Kingdom	The brigantine ran aground in the Solent. She was on a voyage from Swansea, Glamorgan to Rye, Sussex.
Scotland	United Kingdom	The brig ran aground at Dragør, Denmark. She was on a voyage from a Scottish port to Stockholm, Sweden.

== 30 April ==
List of shipwrecks: 30 April 1878
Ship	State	Description
Francesco Starace	Italy	The barque was wrecked on Balabac Island, Spanish East Indies. She was on a voyage from Cebu, Spanish East Indies to the English Channel.

== Unknown date ==
List of shipwrecks: Unknown date in April 1878
Ship	State	Description
Alsace-Lorraine	France	The steamship foundered off The Saints, on the French coast. Her twenty crew survived. She was on a voyage from Bilbao, Spain to Cardiff, Glamorgan, United Kingdom.
Blanch	Canada	The brig was abandoned at sea. Her crew were rescued by the schooner Sea Bird (flag unknown). Blanch was on a voyage from Pascagoula, Mississippi, United States to Saint Kitts.
Conflict, and Daring	United Kingdom	The fishing smacks collided off the Dutch coast and both foundered. Their crew were rescued.
Dairymaid	United Kingdom	The smack foundered in the North Sea before 8 April. Her crew were rescued by a Belgian fishing boat.
Ecliptic	Canada	The sealer was crushed by ice and sunk before 20 April.
Electric Flash	United Kingdom	The schooner was wrecked at Salinas, Brazil. Her six crew were rescued. She was on a voyage from Greenock, Renfrewshire to Pará, Brazil.
Ernest	United Kingdom	The smack was driven ashore. She was on a voyage from Fowey, Cornwall to Hull, Yorkshire. She was refloated with the assistance of a tug and the Spurn Lifeboat.
Francesco Starace	Italy	The barque was wrecked on Balabac Island, Malaya. Her crew were rescued.
Frau Peta	Germany	The schooner collided with the steamship Albion (United Kingdom) and sank. Her crew were rescued by Albion. Frau Peta was on a voyage from Burntisland, Fife, United Kingdom to Wilhelmshaven.
Freedom	United Kingdom	The schooner was abandoned off the mouth of the Humber. Her five crew were rescued by the Spurn Lifeboat.
Hallamshire	United Kingdom	The ship was driven ashore on the Arabian coast. She was refloated and continued her voyage to Bombay, India, where she arrived on 11 April.
Haining	China	The ship was lost in the South China Sea before 17 April.
Hutton	United Kingdom	The ship ran aground in the Red Sea. She was on a voyage from South Shields, County Durham to Bombay. She was refloated and resumed her voyage.
Jemima	Canada	The sealer was crushed by ice and sunk before 20 April.
John Nilson	Canada	The sealer was crushed by ice and sunk before 20 April.
Julia Wood	United States	The schooner was wrecked near Liverpool, Nova Scotia, Canada. Her crew were rescued.
Kedron	Canada	The schooner was abandoned at sea. Her crew were rescued by the schooner Sea Bird.
Marie Anne	France	The barque was abandoned in the Atlantic Ocean. Her crew were rescued by the barque Margaret Edward (United Kingdom). Marie Anne was on a voyage from Africa to Marseille, Bouches-du-Rhône.
Mexicaine	France	The barque was wrecked at Greytown, Nicaragua. Her crew were rescued.
Orlando	United Kingdom	The brig was abandoned in the Atlantic Ocean before 22 April.
Sainte Marie	France	The ship was wrecked on the Charpentiers Rocks with the loss of six of her seven crew, her captain alone surviving. She was on a voyage from Nantes, Loire-Inférieure to Iceland.
Sophia	Canada	The sealer was crushed by ice and sunk before 20 April.
Sorromostro	United Kingdom	The ship was wrecked on The Saints. She was on a voyage from Bilbao to Cardiff.
