= Mallard Cottage =

Historic house in St. John's, Newfoundland and Labrador

Coordinates: 47°34′54″N 52°40′42″W

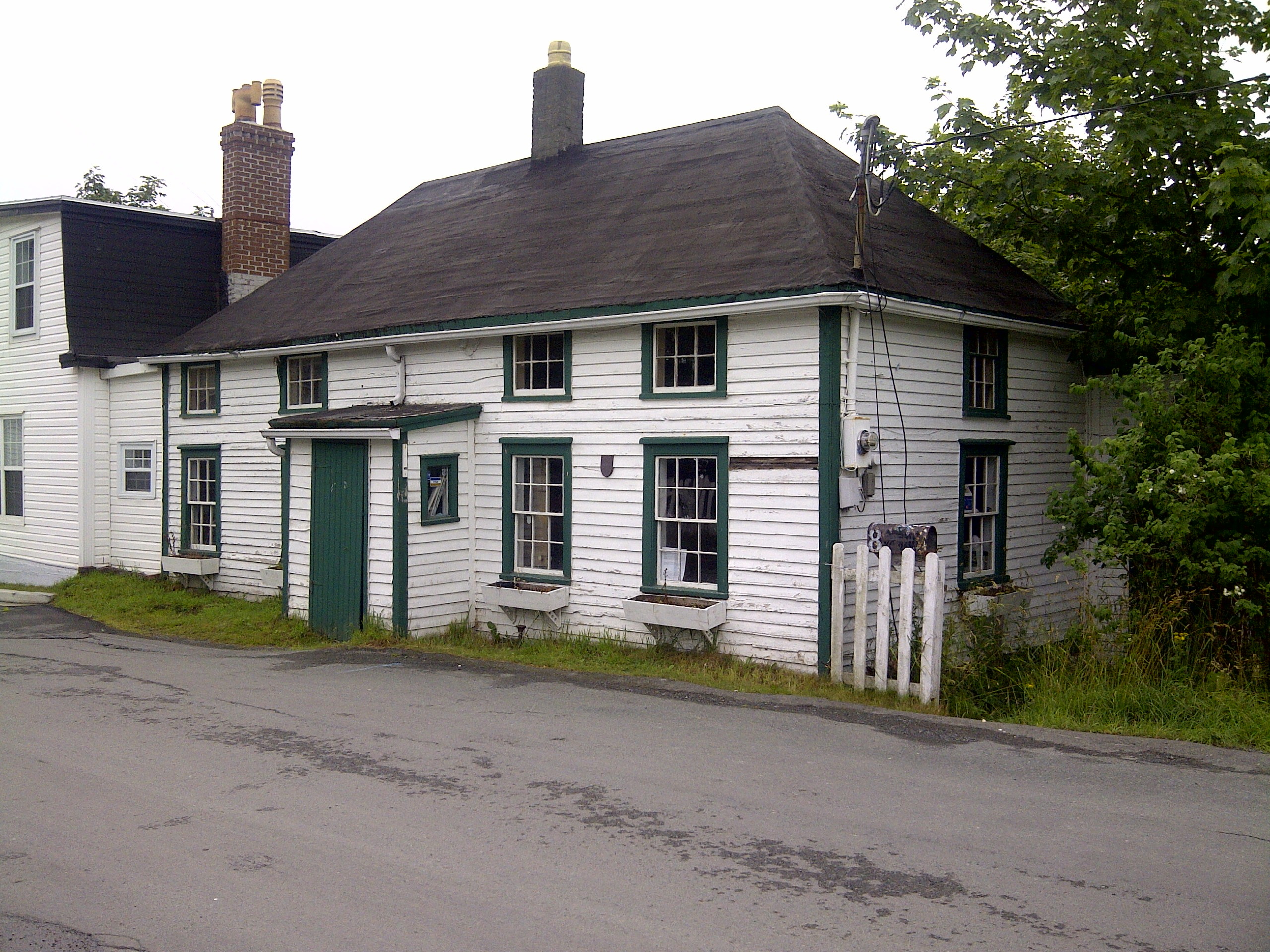
Mallard Cottage Seen in 2012 from Barrows Road

Mallard Cottage is a heritage-designated building located within Quidi Vidi Village in the City of St.John's, Newfoundland and Labrador. The cottage is a one-and-a-half-stories with a hipped roof and central chimney. The architecture is an example of early 19th century vernacular style patterned on Irish thatched-roofed cottages. Though the exact date of construction cannot be confirmed, based on evidence from construction techniques, architectural style, and oral history the date for its construction are placed between 1820 and 1840, making it one of the oldest residential structures in St. John's. Two other buildings in St.John's of the same style are Anderson House, built 1804–1805, and Martin McNamara House, exact construction date unknown. These three structures are the best preserved examples of late 18th and early 19th century architecture in St.John's.

== History ==
Mallard Cottage was built by the Mallard Family, an Irish-immigrant family of fisherfolk and farmers, who resided in the property from its construction until the early 1980s. Though the date of construction is unclear there is a transaction shown in the Registry of Deeds dating to 1803 showing an exchange of chattels between a William Mallard, fisherman, and Messrs. Cunningham, Bell, and Co of St. John's.

== Restoration and heritage designation ==
In 1985 the property was purchased by Peg Magnone. After purchasing, the property underwent major restoration and modernization work. At the time of purchase the property did not have electricity, running water, or an indoors bathroom. Great care was taken in the renovation to preserve the historical significance of the property while also making it usable as an antique shop. The cottage was successfully operated as an antiques store from 1985 until it was purchased from Magnone's granddaughter in 2011.

After Mallard Cottage was purchased in 2011, work began on converting it into a restaurant, including an extension at the rear to create additional dining area of 30 square metres. In addition to the extension a major structural overhaul was completed due to the advanced state of deterioration in certain parts of the cottage when it was purchased. For their success in restoring the cottage as close as possible to its original condition, the owners were presented with the Southcott Award in 2013.

Mallard Cottage was designated a National Historic Site by Parks Canada in fall 1983, a Registered Heritage Structure by the Heritage Foundation of Newfoundland and Labrador in December 1986 and a Heritage Building by the City of St. John's in 2006.

== Current usage ==
Since November 2013, Mallard Cottage has been run as a restaurant. Known for their use of local ingredients and culinary inspiration, the restaurant created by chefs Todd Perrin, Kim Doyle and Sommelier Stephen Lee has won many accolades including being ranked the 22nd best restaurant in Canada by Canada's 100 Best in 2018.
