= The Untamed (1920 film) =

1920 American film by Emmett J. Flynn

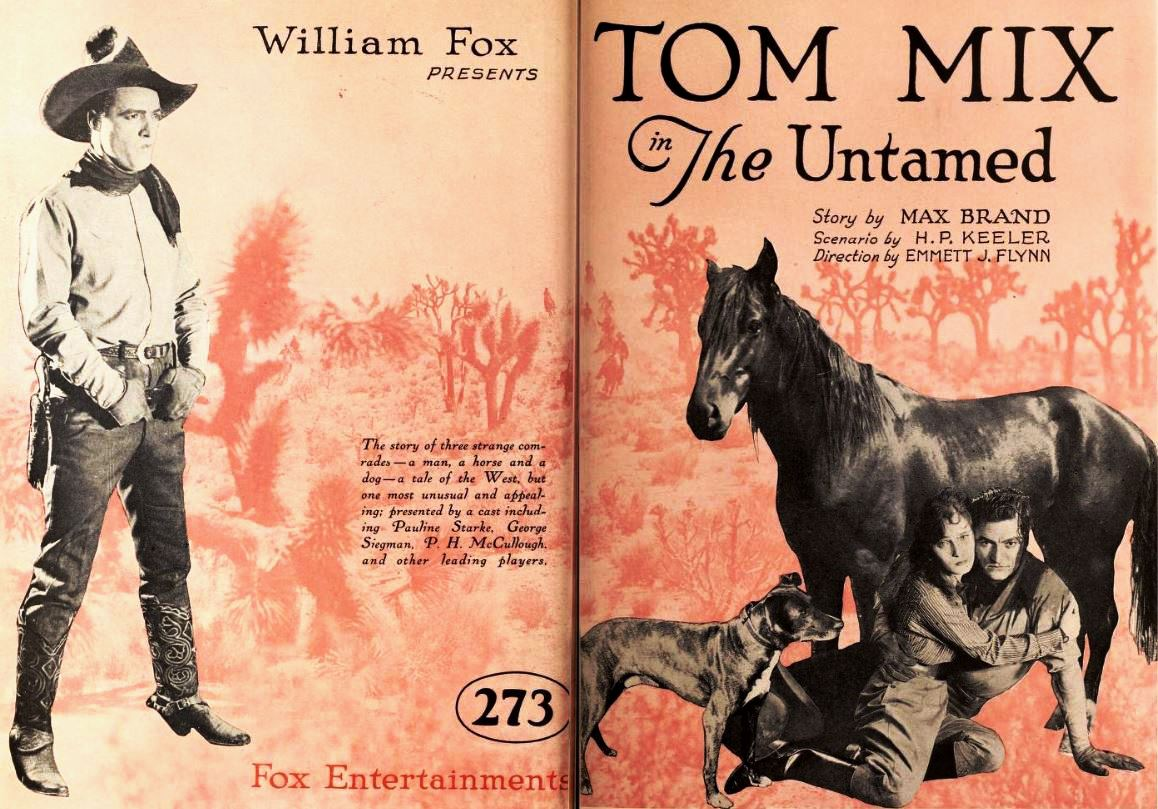
- Advertisement
- Directed by: Emmett J. Flynn
- Written by: H.P. Keeler
- Based on: The Untamed; 1919 novel by Max Brand
- Produced by: William Fox
- Starring: Tom Mix; Pauline Starke; George Siegmann
- Cinematography: Frank B. Good; Irving Rosenberg
- Production company: Fox Film Company
- Distributed by: Fox Film Company
- Release date: August 29, 1920
- Running time: 5 reels
- Country: United States
- Language: Silent (English intertitles)

The Untamed is a 1920 American silent Western film directed by Emmett J. Flynn and starring Tom Mix, Pauline Starke, and George Siegmann. It was based on a novel of the same name by Max Brand and was remade as a sound film Fair Warning in 1931.

== Plot ==
As described in a film magazine, Whistling Dan, the adopted son of rancher Joe Cumberland, has been raised since childhood with the latter aware of his instinct to fight like an animal and kill that which harms him. Joe has forbidden Dan from frequenting Morgan's Place, a gathering ground of local renegades and desperadoes. Joe then purchases the place with the intent to close it, and on the last day of its activity Dan encounters Jim Silent, an insulting cowboy. When he is left behind following an unfair fight to perish in the building after his enemy has set fire to it, Dan is rescued by his dog and horse. Starting off in pursuit of Jim, Dan is followed by Kate, his foster sister and sweetheart. Dan comes to doubt Kate after a pair of misrepresenting circumstances. After she falls into traps set by followers of Jim, she escapes with the help of Dan's dog and a member of Jim's gang who has an obligation to Dan for his freedom from arrest. She affects Dan's rescue and restores his faith in her.

== Cast ==
- Tom Mix as Whistling Dan
- Pauline Starke as Kate Cumberland
- George Siegmann as Jim Silent
- Philo McCullough as Lee Haines
- James O. Barrows as Joe Cumberland
- Charles K. French as Tex Calder
- Pat Chrisman as Kilduff
- Sid Jordan as Hal Purvis
- Major J.A. McGuire as Morgan
- Frank Clark as Sheriff Morris
- Joe Connelly as Buck Daniels

== Preservation ==
A print of The Untamed is in the George Eastman Museum Motion Picture Collection.

== See also ==
- Tom Mix filmography
- List of Fox Film films

== Bibliography ==
- Aubrey Solomon. The Fox Film Corporation, 1915-1935: A History and Filmography. McFarland, 2011.
