= Fair Warning (1931 film) =

1931 film

- Directed by: Alfred L. Werker
- Written by: Max Brand (novel); Ernest Pascal
- Starring: George O'Brien; Louise Huntington; Mitchell Harris
- Cinematography: Ross Fisher
- Edited by: Ralph Dietrich
- Music by: Arthur Kay
- Production company: Fox Movietone
- Distributed by: Fox Film Corporation
- Release date: February 1, 1931
- Running time: 74 minutes
- Country: United States
- Language: English

Fair Warning is a 1931 American pre-Code Western film directed by Alfred L. Werker and starring George O'Brien, Louise Huntington and Mitchell Harris. It is a remake of the 1920 silent film The Untamed. The 1937 film Fair Warning is not a remake of this one. The film's premise came from a novel by Max Brand, which initially was published in serial form in The All-Story from December 7, 1918, through January 11, 1919.

== Plot ==
When Whistlin' Dan Barry is warned to leave a town, he refuses to do so. As a result, he defeats Jim Silent (the town's villain) and gets romantic with Kate Cumberland.

== Cast ==
- George O'Brien as Whistlin' Dan Barry
- Louise Huntington as Kate Cumberland
- Mitchell Harris as Jim Silent
- George Brent as Les Haines
- Nat Pendleton as Purvis
- John Sheehan as Kelduff
- Willard Robertson as Tex Calder
- Ernie Adams as Jordan
- Erwin Connelly as Morgan
- Alphonse Ethier as Mr. Cumberland

== Reception ==
A review in Harrison's Reports called Fair Warning "an excellent outdoor picture" that had O'Brien in a fearless role, helping him to win "the spectator's good will, which follows him throughout the story."

== Bibliography ==
- Aubrey Solomon. The Fox Film Corporation, 1915-1935: A History and Filmography. McFarland, 2011.
