= Newfoundland Chocolate Company =

Canadian chocolate company

- Type: Private
- Founded: 2008
- Founder: Brent Smith, Christina Dove
- Headquarters: Canada
- Website: newfoundlandchocolatecompany.com

The Newfoundland Chocolate Company is a chocolatier established in 2008 in St. John's, Newfoundland, Canada. Christina Dove is sole owner of The Newfoundland Chocolate Company since 2022.

== History ==
The Newfoundland Chocolate Company began as a chocolate making operation in the basement of co-owners Brent Smith and Christina Dove's family home. After selling products to local grocery stores, the couple opened its first production and retail facility in downtown St. John's in 2010.

By August 2015, the company had retail locations in St John's, Newfoundland and Dartmouth, Nova Scotia, and also operated a seasonal café on the Signal Hill National Historic site.

In 2019, the company opened a 10,000-square foot production and retail facility.

The company announced the closing of its three Nova Scotia locations in May 2020 due to the COVID-19 pandemic.

Since 2010, the company has received over $2 million in assistance from the Atlantic Canada Opportunities Agency, a Regional Development Agency (Canada), including $390,000 in June 2020 to mitigate the effects of the COVID-19 pandemic and $750,000 in July 2019 for equipment and improvements.

== Products ==
The Newfoundland Chocolate Company focuses on creating Belgian and French style chocolates, with the emphasis on a chocolate based fill, as opposed to syrup based fills like some of its major North American counterparts. They use caramels, nuts and berries in their chocolates, with priority being given to as many locally sourced ingredients as possible.

All products are manufactured at their head office in St John's, Newfoundland, with the exception of their fresh truffles that are made at each individual location.

== Awards and recognition ==
The Newfoundland Chocolate Company was awarded three different awards at the St John's Board of Trade Business Excellence Awards 2015; Innovation Solutions award, Leader in Growth & Sales award and The Business Excellence Award. The company was also the recipient of the 2014 Atlantic Food Award and have received praise and awards for their representation of Newfoundland and the restoration of a local downtown building into their head office and production facility.
