= Varick Frissell =

American film director (1903–1931)

- Born: Lewis Varick Frissell; 1903; Boston, Massachusetts
- Died: March 15, 1931 (aged 28); Newfoundland
- Occupation: Filmmaker
- Years active: 1925 – 1931
- Relatives: Toni Frissell (sister)

Lewis Varick Frissell (1903 – March 15, 1931) was an American documentary filmmaker. His last film, The Viking, set in Newfoundland, involved the largest loss of life of a film production crew in history. This film was also "the first film to record sound and dialogue on location".

== Early life ==
Frissell came from a well-to-do family (his grandfather was founder and president of the Fifth Avenue Bank of New York), studied at Yale, and took a keen interest in film at an early age. He was mentored by renowned documentarian Robert Flaherty. In 1921, Frissell heard a lecture by Dr Wilfred Grenfell, which inspired him to visit the Labrador mission and to explore the northern wilderness. In 1922, Frissell volunteered to work for the International Grenfell Association, driving a dog team in the winter and working on the hospital boat Strathcona in the summer.

== Film career ==
In 1925, Frissell and fellow Yale student Jim Hillier explored the Hamilton River and shot the first film ever of the great waterfall. They also searched for and discovered the Unknown River of Indian legend and called it the Grenfell River. Frissell wrote an account of his explorations and submitted it to The Geographical Journal for publication entitled Explorations in the Grand Falls Region of Labrador, which earned him membership in the Royal Geographical Society. Frissell completed his film of the Hamilton River and titled it The Lure of Labrador. After graduation from Yale in 1926, he embarked on another film, The Great Arctic Seal Hunt, which was compiled from film he had shot aboard the SS Beothic during the seal hunt.

=== The Viking ===
Frissell formed his own company, the Newfoundland-Labrador Film Company, and obtained the backing of Paramount Pictures to make a feature film, tentatively titled White Thunder. Captain Bob Bartlett played the ship's captain in this film about the Newfoundland seal hunt. This was the first Hollywood-style sound film ever made in what is now Canada. Frissell filmed most of The Viking (named for a sealing ship) in Quidi Vidi in 1930.

For realistic footage, Frissell then took his crew to the Grand Banks and Labrador to film exciting action sequences. The film debuted at the Nickel Theatre at St. John's on March 5, 1931, where Frissell decided that his movie needed more real scenes from the sea ice. Within days, Frissell and his crew had boarded the SS Viking for its annual seal hunt; it got trapped in ice near the Horse Islands.

== Death ==
On March 15, 1931, a cache of dynamite being stored in case it was needed to break the ship free from the ice pans exploded, destroying the stern of the ship, killing 28 men, including Frissell. The ship subsequently sank, and Frissell's body and his pet Newfoundland dog, Cabot, were never found.

== Aftermath ==
White Thunder, a National Film Board documentary on Frissell's life, directed by Newfoundlander Victoria King, was released in 2002.

== See also ==
- List of people of Newfoundland and Labrador

== Bibliography ==
- Rhodes, Gary Don. White Zombie: Anatomy of a Horror Film. Jefferson, North Carolina: McFarland & Company, 2001. ISBN 978-0-7864-0988-4.
- Rist, Peter. Guide to the Cinema(s) of Canada. Westport, Connecticut: Greenwood Publishing Group, 2001. ISBN 978-0-3132-9931-5.
