= Quidi Vidi Brewing Company =

Canadian craft brewery

Coordinates: 47.581455°N 52.676228°W

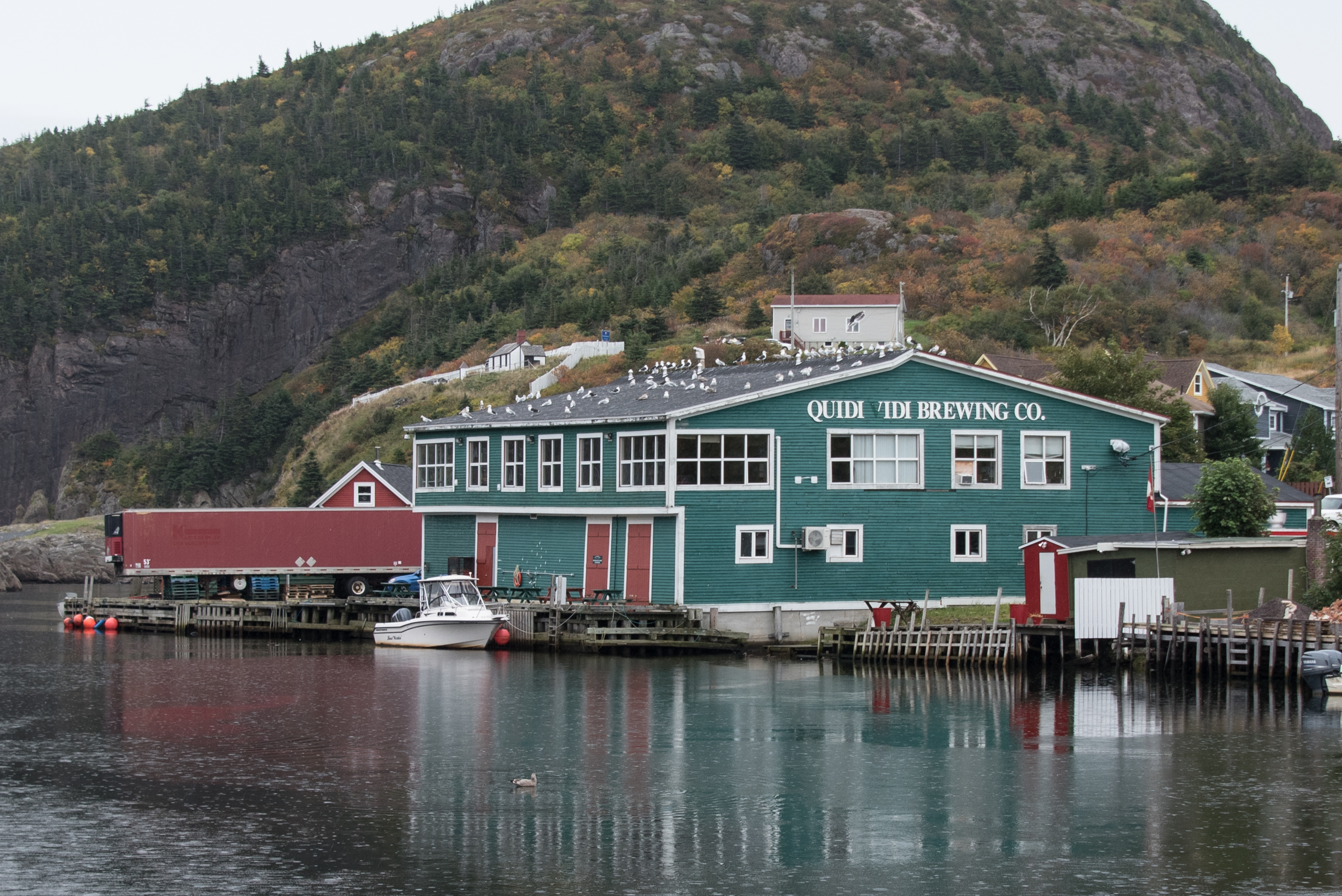
- Industry: Alcoholic drink
- Founded: 1996
- Headquarters: St. John's, Newfoundland and Labrador; Canada
- Products: Beer Craft Beer

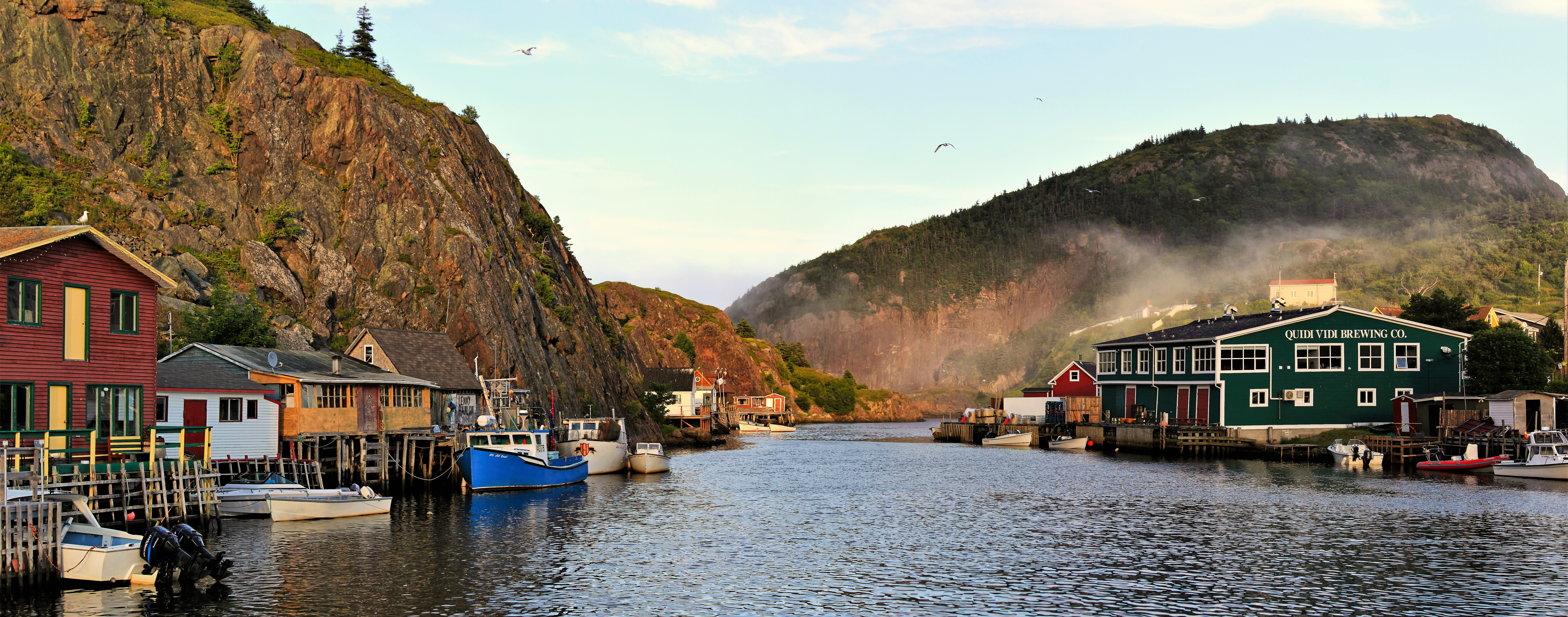
Quidi Vidi in St. John's, NL Canada

Quidi Vidi Brewing Company is a craft brewery in Quidi Vidi village, a neighbourhood of St. John's, Newfoundland and Labrador, Canada.

Founded in 1996 by David Fong and David Reese in a former fish plant, the brewery is an important tourist destination. Currently, over 25 different brews are offered year round. This includes the famous blue bottled Iceberg Beer, which is made with 20,000 year old iceberg water which is harvested from icebergs off the coast of Newfoundland.

Quidi Vidi Brewery is the third-largest brewer in the province of Newfoundland and Labrador, after Labatt and Molson. Its products are available province-wide in liquor stores, corner stores and on draft. Quidi Vidi Brewery’s beer can also be found in other provinces across Canada like Nova Scotia, Prince Edward Island, Manitoba, Saskatchewan, and Alberta.

== Products ==
+ indicates product is discontinued.

Lagers

- Iceberg Lager (since 1996)
- 'Son of a Critch' Lager
- Oktoberfest Marzen Lager
- Dry Hopped Lager
- Outhouse Homebrew Light Lager
- Crown & Anchor Light Lager
- RDL Craft Lager
- Premium Lager +
- Margarita Cerveza Lager
- Newfermenters Series - Half Nelson Sour Lager

Stouts

- Cappuccino Stout
- Imperial Black Forest Stout
- Russian Imperial Stout
- Dry Irish Stout

Ales

- 1892 Traditional Ale
- American Pale Ale
- Brewer's Original Series - Nathan's Kveik Pale Ale
- Mummer's Brew Cream Ale
- Honey Brown Ale +
- Eric's Cream Ale +

IPAs

- Arts & IPAs 02 - East Meets West IPA
- Arts & IPAs 03 - Rye IPA
- Arts & IPAs 04 - Orange Creamsicle IPA
- Oceanside Session IPA
- Squeezebox New England IPA
- Squeezebox New England IPA w/ Idaho 7
- Dayboil Session IPA
- Calm Tom Double IPA
- British IPA
- Milky Way New England IPA +

Sours

- Art Skeet Dry-Hopped Sour
- Director's Cut - Strawberry Kiwi Sour
- Iron Cherry Sour
- Aloha Sour
- Sofa Sour - Pink Lemonade
- Sofa Sour - Pomegranate Strawberry Creamsicle
- Sofa Sour - Peach Raspberry
- Sofa Sour - Strawberry Guava Creamsicle
- Sofa Sour - Passion Fruit
- Sofa Sour - Pineapple
- Sofa Sour - Each Peach, Pear, Plum
- Sofa Sour - Key Lime Cherry

Newfermenter Series

- Newfermenters Series - Lost in Time
- Newfermenters Series - Sabby Sour
- Newfermenters Series - Wisdom and Wit
- Newfermenters Series - Darkstar

Other Beers

- Weizenhammer
- Brewer's Original Series - Isaac's Czech Pilsner
- Brewer's Original Series - Jason's Hopfenweisse
- Brewer's Original Series - Al's Biere de Garde
- Rhinegold Red Altbier
- American Wheat
- Mad Mike's Big Bad Belgian
- Three Seasons Saison
- Imperial Coconut Porter
- Uncle Fred's +
- Perfect Storm +
