= Toni Frissell =

American photographer (1907–1988)

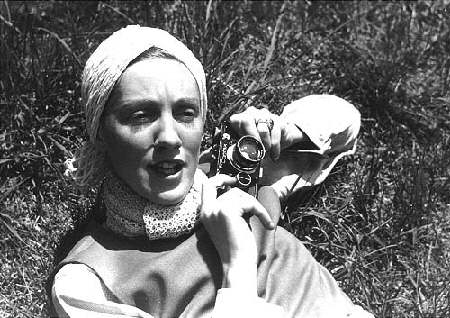
- "I'd Rather Stalk with a Camera Than a Gun", c. 1935
- Born: Antoinette Frissell; March 10, 1907; New York City, US
- Died: April 17, 1988 (aged 81); Long Island, New York, US
- Occupation: Photographer
- Spouse: Francis M. Bacon III
- Children: 2

Antoinette Frissell Bacon (March 10, 1907 – April 17, 1988), known professionally as Toni Frissell, was an American photographer. She was known for her innovations in fashion photography, World War II photographs, and portraits of famous Americans, Europeans, children, and women from all walks of life.

== Early life and education ==
Antoinette Frissell was born in New York in 1907 to Lewis Fox Frissell and Antoinette Wood Montgomery. Her brothers were Phelps Montgomery Frissell and Varick Frissell, who became a filmmaker and died in Newfoundland during the filming of The Viking in 1931.

The Frissells were grandchildren of Algernon Sydney Frissell, founder and president of the Fifth Avenue Bank of New York, and his wife. They were great-grandchildren of Mary (Whitney) Phelps and Governor of Missouri John S. Phelps. Other ancestors in that line include Elisha Phelps, US representative from Connecticut (1819–21, 1825–29); and Maj. Gen. Noah Phelps, a Revolutionary War hero.

== Career ==
When Frissell was young, she was passionate about theater, but after performing in two roles in Max Reinhardt productions, she realized it was not for her. In her early 20s, she started taking photographs, in part because of her brother, Varick Frissell, a filmmaker and photographer who taught her the basics of the relatively new field.

Familiar with many of the families and sports of the upper class, she began to photograph sportsmen and women in such fields as golf and sailing. She photographed many leading figures in these fields for Sports Illustrated.

== Marriage and family ==
She married Francis MacNeil “Mac” Bacon on September 9, 1932, after a few months of the couple’s romance. He was also a socialite. She had a passion for skiing. Toni and her husband purchased a large, white house on Long Island at Saint James called 'Sherrewogue'. It was on the water of Stony Brook Harbor, and the couple and their family lived there for nearly 50 years. Later the couple and their daughter went on a three-month-long skiing trip after the daughter’s graduation.

In the early 1970s, Frissell began to have trouble with her memory. To counteract this, she began to write a memoir, and completed a nearly thousand-page manuscript. Her memoir recounts the times from her childhood to her later life, detailing her privileged upbringing, exploration of Europe, parties in her 20s, youth romances, and attraction for the life of the rich.

== Pre-war career ==
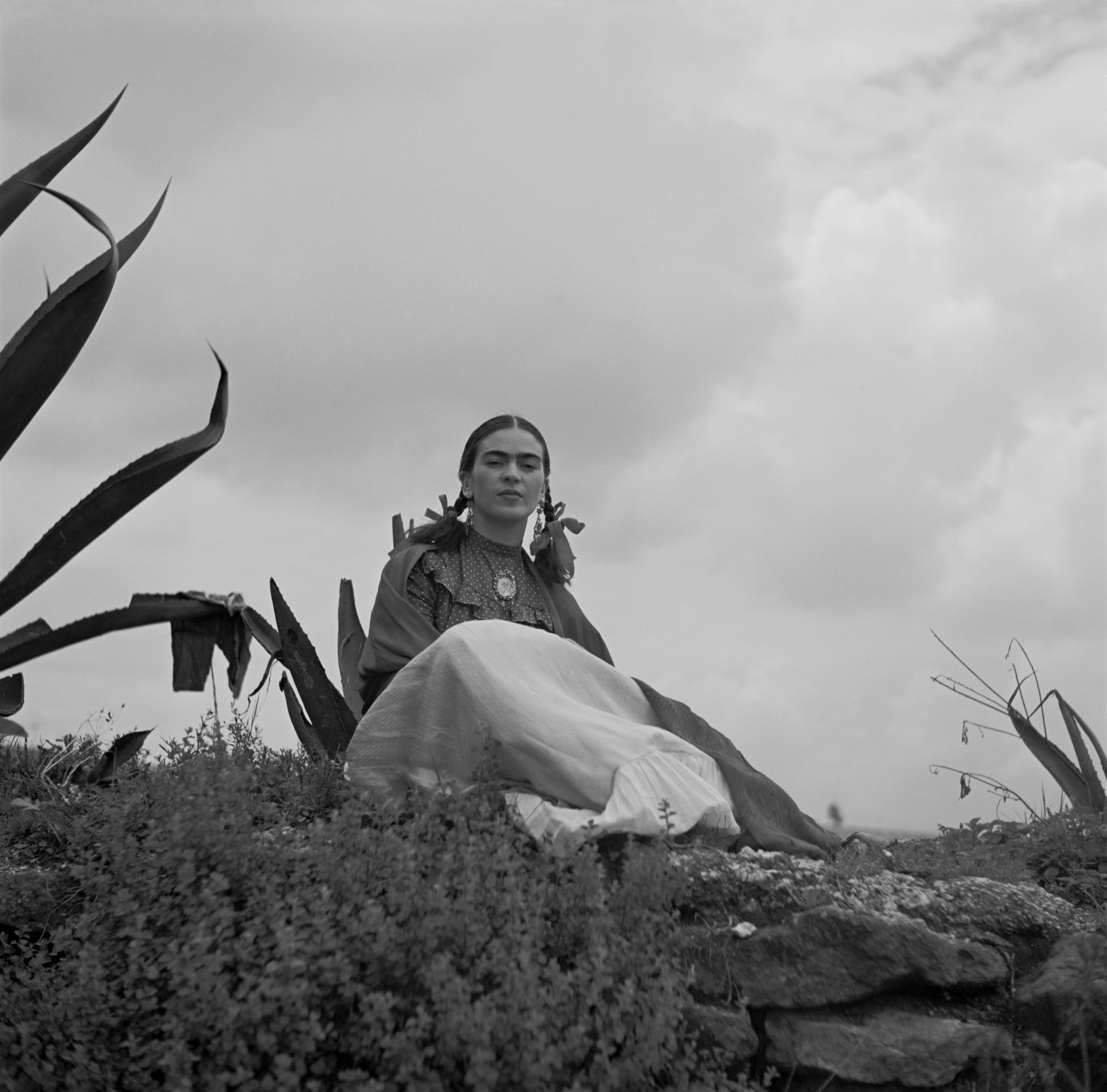
1937 photograph of Frida Kahlo for Vogue

Although Frissell had married by the time she started working professionally, she used Toni Frissell to identify herself. At the beginning of her career, she worked briefly for Vogue, writing captions. She was fired because of her poor spelling, but was encouraged by Vogue’s fashion editor Carmel Snow to take up photography.

She used it to cope with the illness of her mother, the death of her brother Varick Frissell, and the end of her engagement to Count Serge Orloff-Davidoff. Her first published picture was in Town and Country magazine. After this, she got a contract with Vogue. She apprenticed with Cecil Beaton.

She worked with many other famous photographers of the day. She first worked as a fashion photographer for Vogue in 1931. Condé Montrose Nast provided her entree to the magazine. She later took photographs for Harper's Bazaar. Her fashion photos were often notable for their outdoor settings, emphasizing active women, even in elaborate evening gowns. She was one of the first fashion photographers to set photos outside the studio, setting a trend in the field. She said that she did not shoot indoors primarily because “I don't know how to photograph in a studio. I never did know about technical points and still don't”. Her style continued in this ‘plein air’ way throughout her career. For this kind of innovation and experimentation she was well known.

== World War II ==
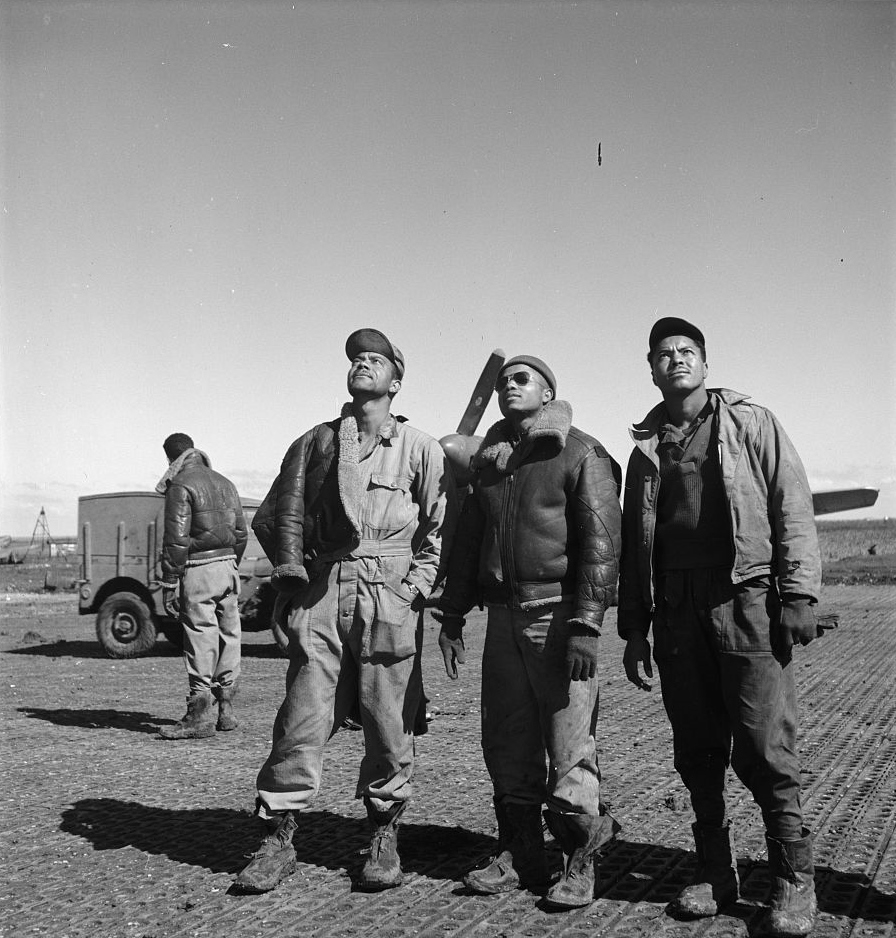
Tuskegee Airmen, March 1945.

In 1941, Frissell volunteered her photographic services to the American Red Cross. Later she worked for the Eighth Army Air Force and became the official photographer of the Women's Army Corps. On behalf of the War Department and the Red Cross, she took thousands of images of nurses, front-line soldiers, WACs, African-American airmen, and orphaned children.

Frissell twice traveled to the European front. Her first picture to be published in Life magazine was of bombed-out London in 1942. Her moving photographs of military women and African American fighter pilots in the elite 332d Fighter Group (the "Tuskegee Airmen") were used to encourage public support for women and African Americans in the military.

During the War she produced a series of photographs of children that were used in an edition of Robert Louis Stevenson's much-published A child's garden of verses. This was an early example of the successful use of photography in illustrating children's literature.

== After the war ==
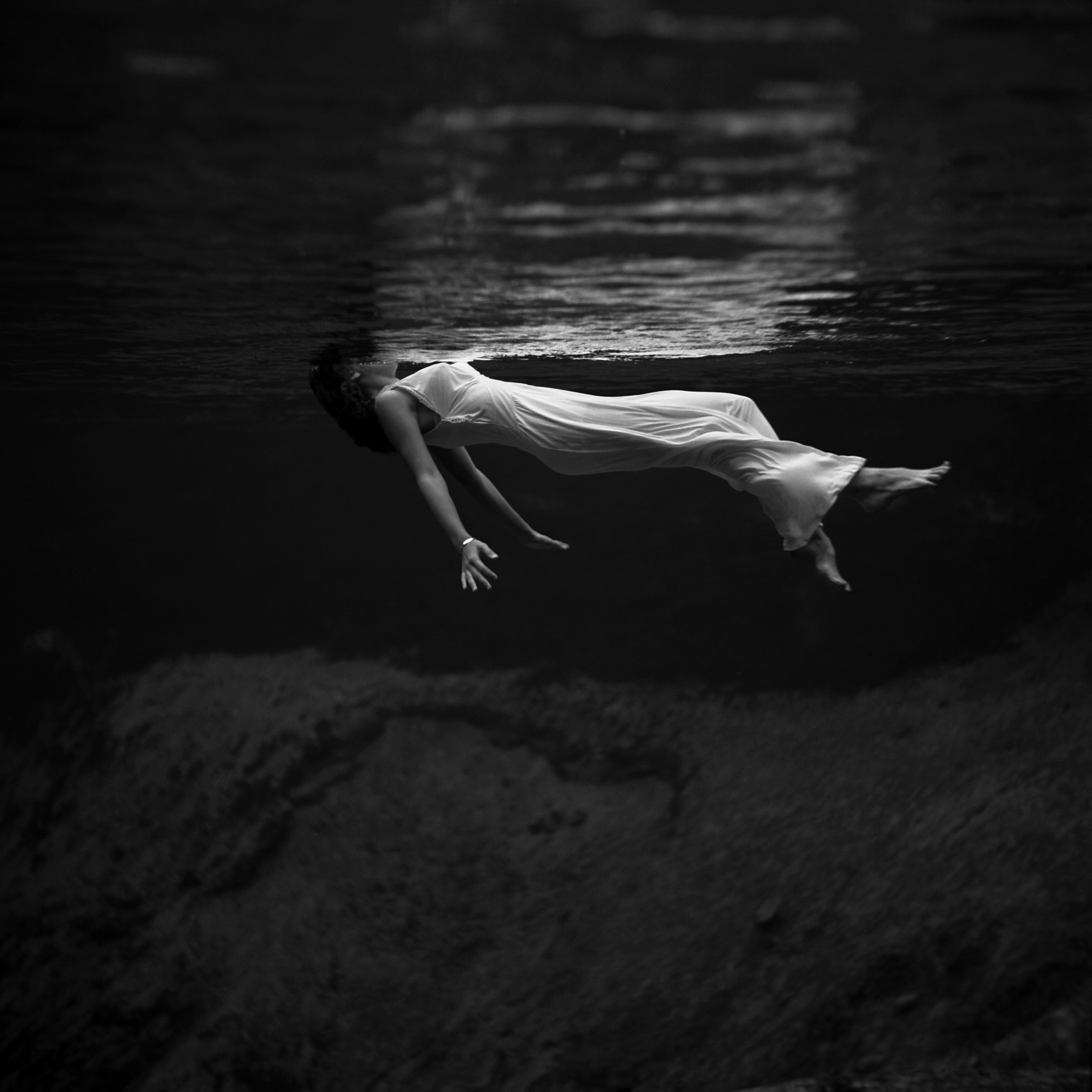
Weeki Wachee, Florida (1947). This image was later used as the cover for the jazz album Undercurrent and other albums.

In the 1950s, Frissell took informal portraits of the famous and powerful in the United States and Europe, including Winston Churchill, Eleanor Roosevelt, the Vanderbilts, architect Stanford White and John F. and Jacqueline Kennedy. She worked for Sports Illustrated and Life magazines. Throughout her photographic career, she worked at home and abroad for these large publications.

When she grew tired of fashion photography and fluctuating between contracts with Vogue and Harper’s Bazaar, she continued her interest in active women and sports. She was hired in 1953 as the first woman on the staff of Sports Illustrated. For several decades, she was one of few female sport photographers. After 1950, she did freelance work for Life, Look, Vogue, and Sports until her retirement in 1967.

In later work she concentrated on photographing women from all walks of life, often as a commentary on the human condition. Her iconic 1944 photograph, My Shadow, of a boy with outstretched arms admiring his long shadow on the sea sand, was selected by Edward Steichen for the world-touring exhibition The Family of Man at the Museum of Modern Art in New York. First used for book illustration, at MOMA it was seen by 9 million visitors. In 1957 the photograph was used for the cover of a popular psychology text.

In 1963 an entire feature in LIFE magazine was devoted to versions of her 'The Loving Embrace' photographs from throughout her career.

== Legacy ==
In 1966 Life magazine paid tribute to her in a page 3 editorial profile, headed "Patrician Photographer of a Vanishing Age".

Frissell died of Alzheimer's disease on April 17, 1988, in a Long Island nursing home. Her husband, Francis M. Bacon 3rd, of Bacon, Stevenson & Company, had predeceased her. She was survived by their daughter Sidney, and their son Varick (named for Frissell's brother).

The collection of her photos in the Library of Congress contains around 340,000 images. Because of its size, it is not completely available to the public. She and her husband donated her archive of film negatives in 1971.

According to the International Center of Photography, Frissell's major contribution to fashion photography was her development of the realistic (as opposed to the staged) fashion photograph in the 1930s and 1940s. Like Martin Munkacsi, she mastered the appearance of unselfconscious spontaneity in fashion pictures by working outside and on location with her models. She had a tendency to use uncommon perspectives, which she achieved by placing her camera on a dramatic diagonal axis, and/or using a low point of view and a wide-angle lens against a neutral background, thus creating the illusion of elongated human form. With her preference for close-ups and straightforward, unembellished images of winsome, sportswear-clad models, Frissell's action-fashion photographs are landmarks in the development of postwar fashion imagery.

== Publications ==
=== Publications by Frissell ===
- The King Ranch, 1939-1944: A photographic essay. 1965. With an introduction and captions by Holland McCombs.
- Toni Frissell: Photographs: 1933-1967. Doubleday, 1994. ISBN 978-0385471886. With an introduction by George Plimpton and a foreword by Sidney Frissell Stafford.

=== Others' works, with photographs by Frissell ===
- A Child's Garden of Verses. 1944.
- Bermuda: The Happy Island. 1946.
- Mother Goose. 1948.
- Tethered. 2008. By Amy MacKinnon.
- Bob and Helen Kleberg of King Ranch. 2017. ISBN 9781595348173.
