= SS Viking =

Norwegian wooden ship

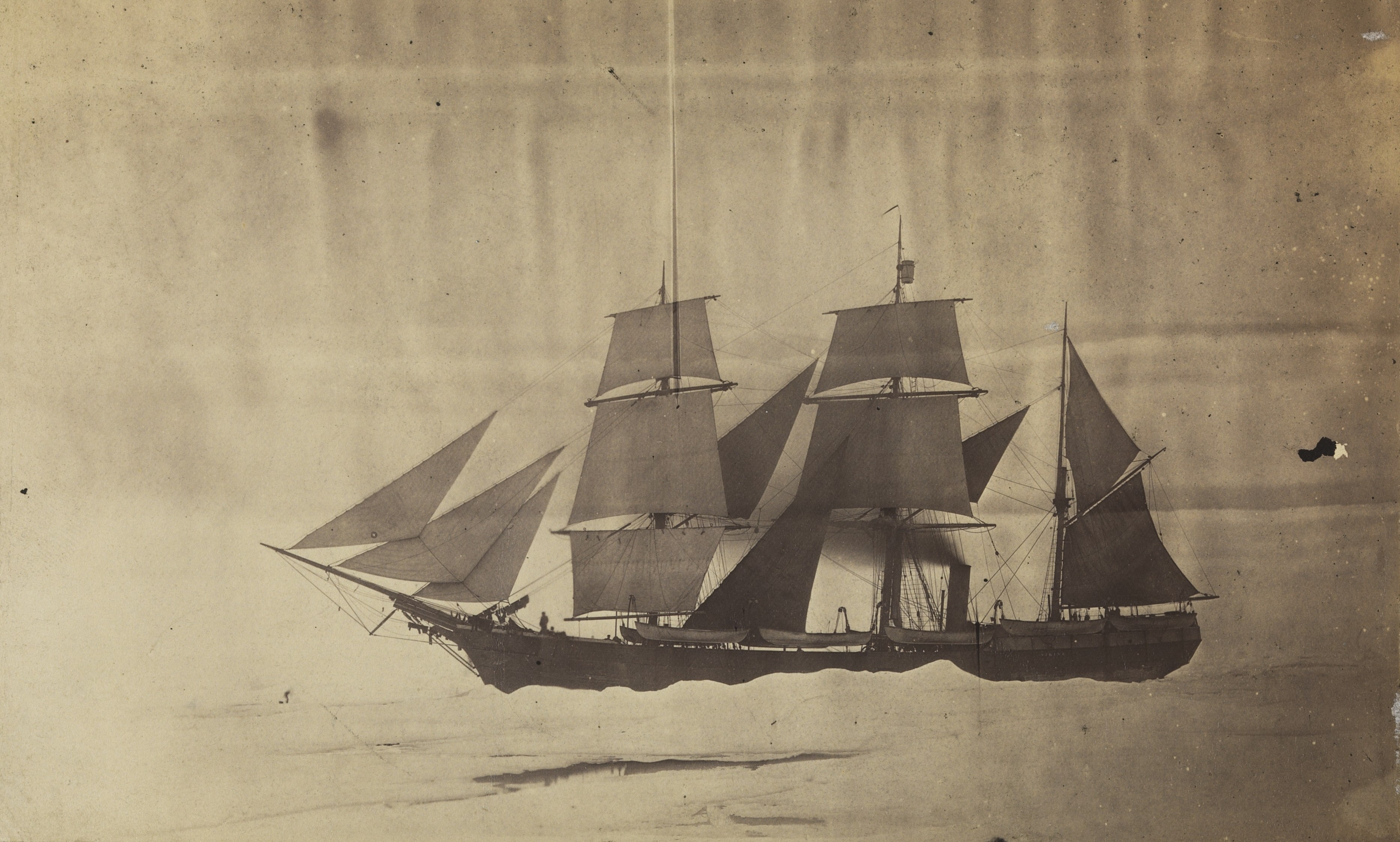
- Viking in 1882

History
- Name: Viking
- Builder: Nylands Shipyards, Oslo, Norway
- Laid down: 1881
- Launched: 1882
- Identification: Official Number 117314
- Fate: Exploded and sank off Horse Islands in 1931

General characteristics
- Tonnage: 586 GRT
- Length: 47.2 m (155 ft)
- Beam: 9.69 m (31.8 ft)
- Depth: 5.39 m (17.7 ft)
- Installed power: Sails, Diesel Engine. Output: 90 horsepower (67 kW)
- Propulsion: 1 screw

SS Viking was a wooden-hulled sealing ship made famous by its role in the 1931 film The Viking. During her use in the seal hunt in Newfoundland, the ship was twice commissioned by the film crew. During production, an explosion destroyed the ship, resulting in the loss of the director, Varick Frissell, and the cinematographer, Alexander Gustavus Penrod, in addition to the lives of 24 or 27 of the ship's crew and film crew.

== History ==
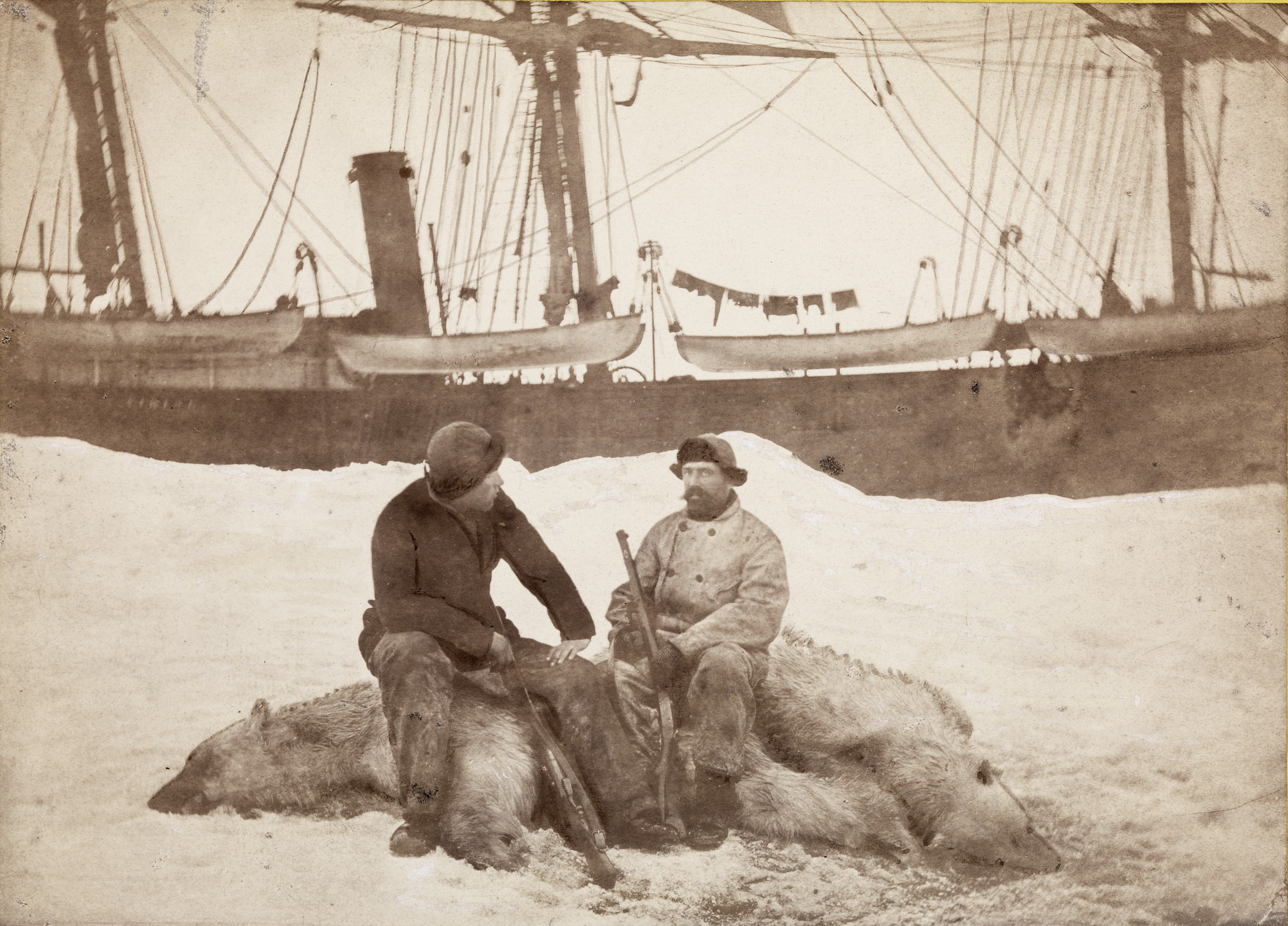
Fridtjof Nansen (left) and Captain Axel Krefting, sitting on just shot polar bear with the Viking in the background (One of the pictures from a journey with sealers to Vestisen during the period March to July 1882).

In 1881, Viking was built by the Nylands Shipyard at Christiania, Norway, the same location where another famous Newfoundland vessel, Southern Cross, was constructed. Viking was a vessel of 620 gross tons and equipped with a 90-horsepower (67 kW) auxiliary engine. She was launched in 1882 from the Arendal Shipyard in Norway.

Viking sailed for a number of years hunting the saddleback seal off the coast of Greenland. In 1882, Norwegian explorer, scientist and diplomat Fridtjof Nansen used her for his first Arctic expedition.

In 1904, Viking was purchased by Bowring Brothers of St. John's, Newfoundland for the sealing industry. She was placed under the command of Captain William Bartlett, who remained her master until 1926. Subsequently, she was later commanded by G. Whitley (1927), I. Barbour (1928, 1929) and R. Badcock (1930).

Viking was the smallest of the Bowring Brothers fleet, but was capable of carrying 276 men.

== Feature film ==
With funding from Paramount Pictures, S.S. Viking was chartered by the newly formed Newfoundland-Labrador Film Company to make a feature film set against the annual seal hunt off the coast of Newfoundland. In 1930, Varick Frissell, the director of the actuality scenes (but not of the fictional scenes), and his crew sailed to the ice floes aboard SS Ungava and subsequently the same spring aboard Viking. Viking was commanded on this second voyage in 1930 by Captain Bob Bartlett (the son of Captain William Bartlett, Viking's first skipper), who was also cast in the role of the fictitious skipper, Captain Barker.

White Thunder, the film's original name, was screened early in 1931, at the Nickel Theatre in St. John's. Paramount declined to release the film. Hoping to strengthen White Thunder with additional footage, Frissell, along with cinematographer, A. G. Penrod, H. Sargent, and their assistants, again chartered passage on Viking.

== Fate ==
On March 9, 1931, the ship, skippered by Captain Abram Kean, Jr., left port. She carried 138 sealers and two stowaways, in addition to the film crew.

Late in the day on March 15, 1931, heavy ice was encountered off White Bay. Captain Keane ordered the ship butted into the ice jam to secure her for the night. At 9 p.m., an explosion blew the stern off the vessel, likely instantly killing the film crew in the saloon. The ship then caught fire, leaving survivors to fend on the ice. Captain Abram Keane was badly hurt, but survived. Many of the survivors made the over-ice trek to Horse Island, 8 mi (13 km) distant, while others were rescued by the steamers Foundation Franklin and Sagona, which had been dispatched to the area. In total the accident killed 24 or 27 people, with one dying on Sagona on the way to port. Frissell and Penrod died in the explosion.

A later government commission could determine no more definitive cause for the sinking than that the explosives magazine had exploded. The report indicated that gunpowder had been mishandled. Sir Wilfred Grenfell noted in his introduction to the subsequently released film, The Viking, that dynamite was a routine item included in a sealing ship's provisions. It was required to free the ship, should it become ice-bound.

The ship's loss was the first for Bowring Brothers in 52 years.

== Bibliography ==
- Rhodes, Gary Don. White Zombie: Anatomy of a Horror Film. Jefferson, North Carolina: McFarland & Company, 2001. ISBN 978-0-7864-0988-4
- Rist, Peter. Guide to the Cinema(s) of Canada. Westport, Connecticut: Greenwood Publishing Group, 2001. ISBN 978-0-3132-9931-5
