= Horse Islands =

Islands near Newfoundland, Canada

Coordinates: 50°12′37″N 55°44′58″W

Horse Islands off of the Newfoundland coast

Horse Islands is the name of the two islands that also bears its name, situated off the coast of Newfoundland, Canada. Horse Islands was the scene of a terrific accident of a Hollywood movie gone awry.

Horse Islands, located off the tip of the Baie Verte Peninsula, are two islands: Western Island, the smaller of the two, and Eastern Island, about three times the size of the former. They are sometimes referred to as St. Barbe Islands. Western Island does not provide for easy access and never contained any permanent settlement. Its shape is interrupted by long jagged rocks that jut out into the ocean on the north side of the island called Nervous Rocks. The Eastern Island contains the only suitable harbour where fisherman could make landfall and was first settled by the Bath family in 1836. Both islands were densely wooded and provided adequate supply of firewood for its residents.

Horse Islands, the settlement, is located on Eastern Island. The settlement of Horse Islands was broken down into two communities: Eastern Harbour and Western Harbour, which were less than one kilometre apart and built on two different inlets, both on the south-central part of Eastern Island. Government records indicate that Western Harbour was settled in the 1850s or early 1860s. Family surnames of the Horse Islands included Andrews, Bath, Burton, Curtis, Greenham, Hynes, Lock, Normore, Rideout, Simms and Toms.

The settlement of Horse Islands reached its peak in population in 1956 when it had a population of 215. Shortly after the population fell into decline and in 1966 its residents had agreed to resettle to the mainland Newfoundland. Most of the residents resettled in the community of La Scie, where they could find adequate housing, social services and employment.

Horse Islands became famous during the shooting of a Canadian movie, with financial backing from Paramount Pictures, The Viking, directed by Varick Frissell, a New York filmmaker. The movie was shot aboard the SS Viking, and it was to feature the lives of Newfoundland Sealers. On 15 March 1931, while the film crew were preparing to shoot background footage, the whole stern of Viking was blown off by an explosion. Viking caught fire and sank, killing Frissel and 26 other men. Some of the survivors made the over-ice trek to the Horse Islands, while some were rescued by other vessels dispatched to the area.

== See also ==
- List of communities in Newfoundland and Labrador
