= Nickel Theatre =

Coordinates: 47°34′00.61″N 52°42′34.21″W

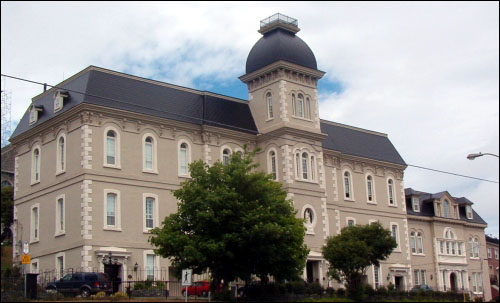
Home of the Nickel Theatre, St. Patrick's Hall, St. John's, Newfoundland

The Nickel Theatre was the first movie theatre in Newfoundland. Part of the five-cent picture show craze that brought daily movies to almost every city and town all across North America, the Nickel opened in the Benevolent Irish Society's St. Patrick's Hall on July 1, 1907, one of a chain of B.F. Keith's Nickels in New England and Eastern Canada. Three more five-cent shows opened in St. John's by October 1907, all in large pre-existing community halls like the Nickel, rather than the small storefront nickelodeon typical of the time in the United States, Ontario, and larger cities in Canada. The Nickel is remembered fondly as the beginnings of moviegoing in Newfoundland, its name is used today for the local film festival. While cinema had debuted in December 1897, and moving pictures played in St. Patrick's Hall before 1907, the Nickel indeed offered the people of St. John's daily public amusement for the first time.

== Site ==
Located in the top floor of the Benevolent Irish Society (BIS) building at 48 Queen's Road. in St. John's, Newfoundland.

== Theatre details ==
Apparently, the 1000 chairs came from John Lake's furniture factory in Fortune, Newfoundland.

== Timeline ==
- December 13, 1897: First showing of moving pictures in St. John's, Lumiere's Cinematographe at the Methodist College Hall.
- July 1, 1907: Opening of the Nickel.
- March 1908: The Roman Catholic Bishop of Newfoundland bans attending picture shows during Lent, a church rule in effect until 1915.
- Closed in 1960, the Nickel remains the longest operating cinema in St. John's.

== People ==
Longtime Proprietor, J.P. Kiely from Montreal, first came to St. John's as an employee of the Keith's chain, often singing illustrated songs between the moving pictures. He later became owner until the Nickel closed in 1960. He was one of the few survivors of the SS Florizel disaster, and in later years owned and operated other movie theatres in the city.

== Modern Ties ==
- The namesake continues in St. John's as the Nickel Film Festival.
- The BIS building that contained the Nickel Theatre has been since converted into 3 very high-end condominiums.
